= Berislavić =

Berislavić is a surname, derived from the male given name Berislav. It may refer to:

- Berislavić Doborski (also Grabarski), Bosnian noble family
- Berislavić Trogirski, Croatian noble family
- Berislavić Vrhrički (also Malomlački), Croatian noble family
