= House of Berislavić =

House of Berislavić may refer to various Croatian noble families:

- Berislavići Grabarski
- Berislavići Trogirski
- Berislavići Malomlački
