= Syrmia =

Historical region in Serbia and Croatia

Syrmia Срем/Srem (Serbian) Srijem (Croatian) Срим/Srim (Pannonian Rusyn)
- Historical region
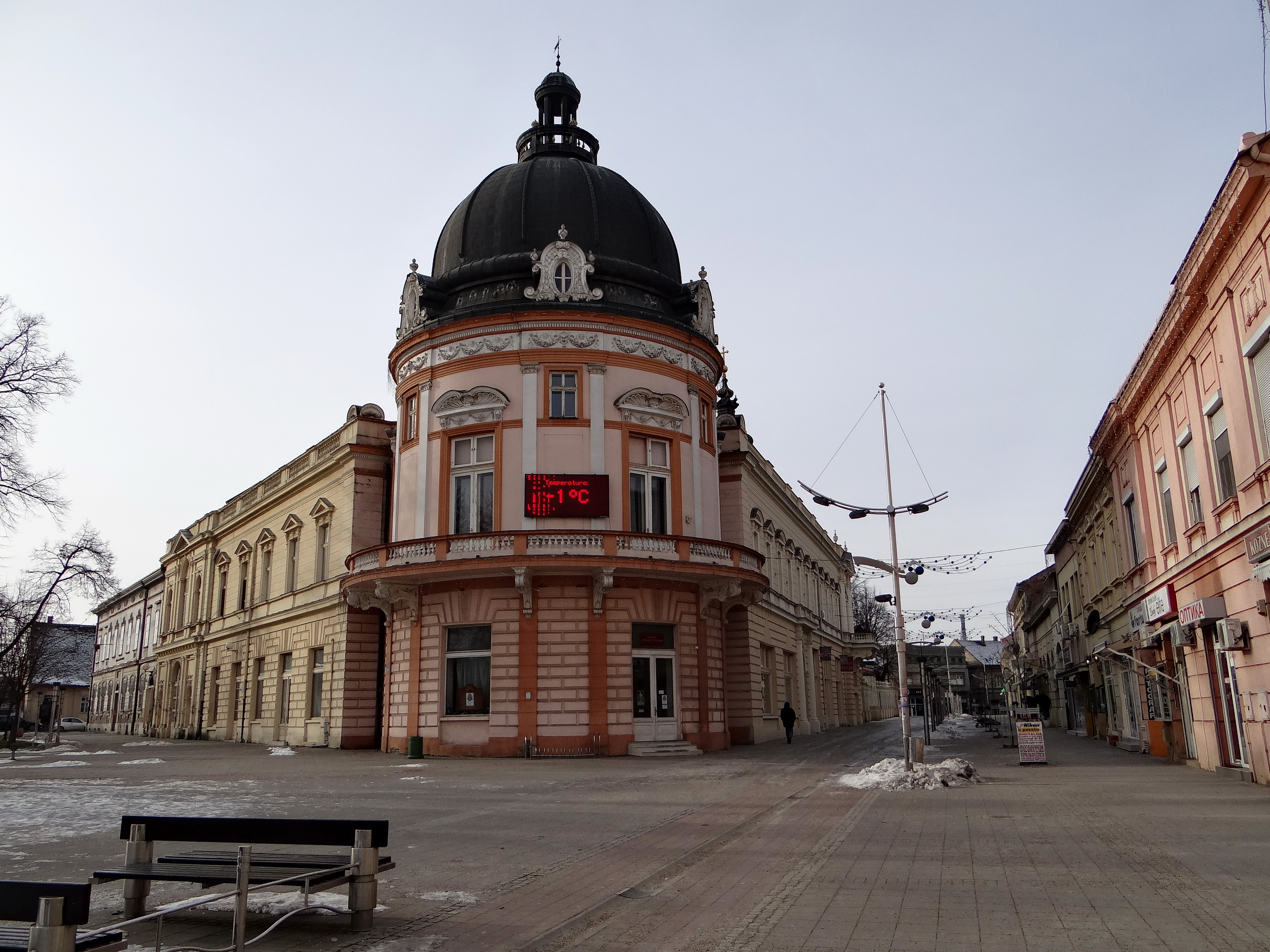
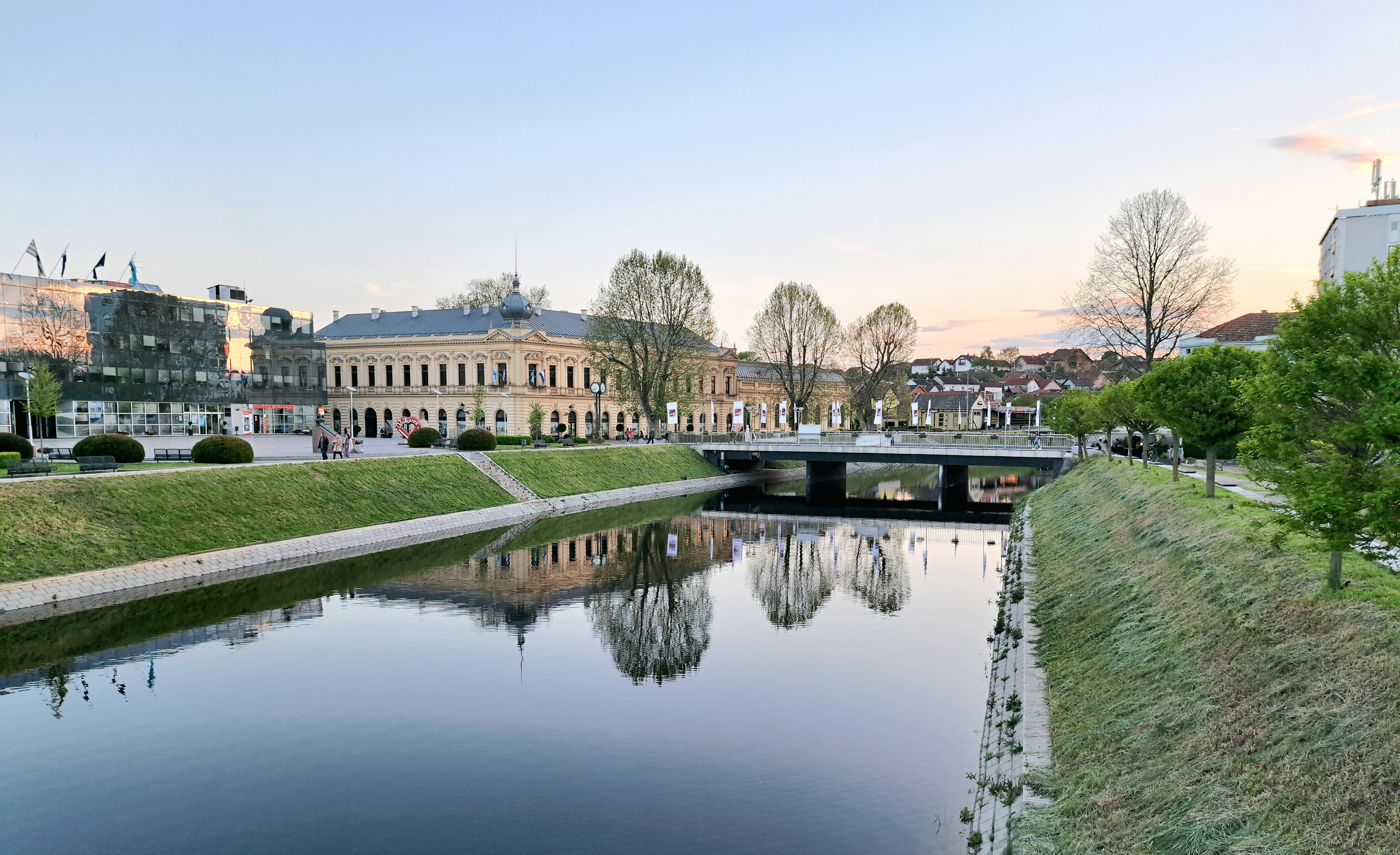
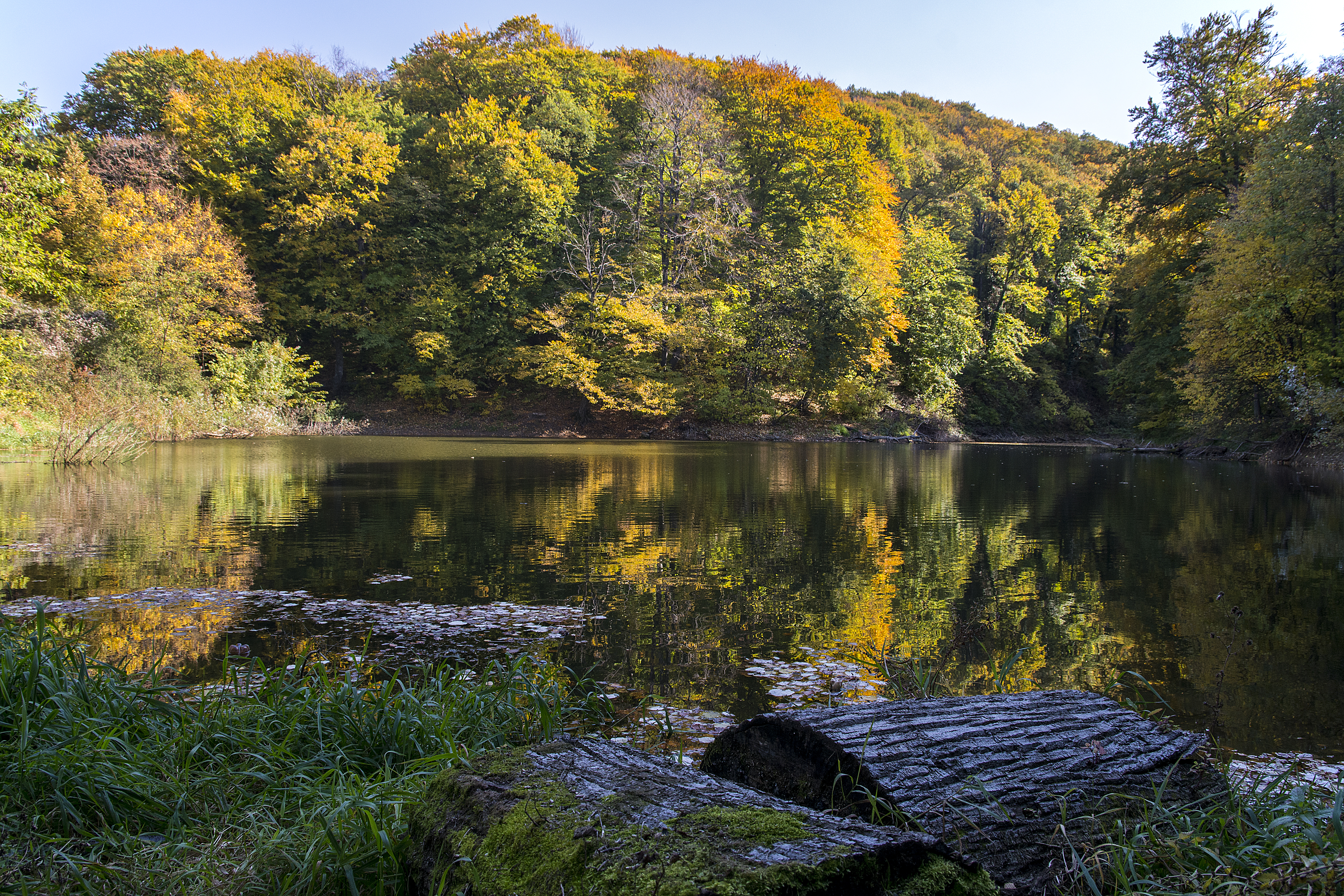
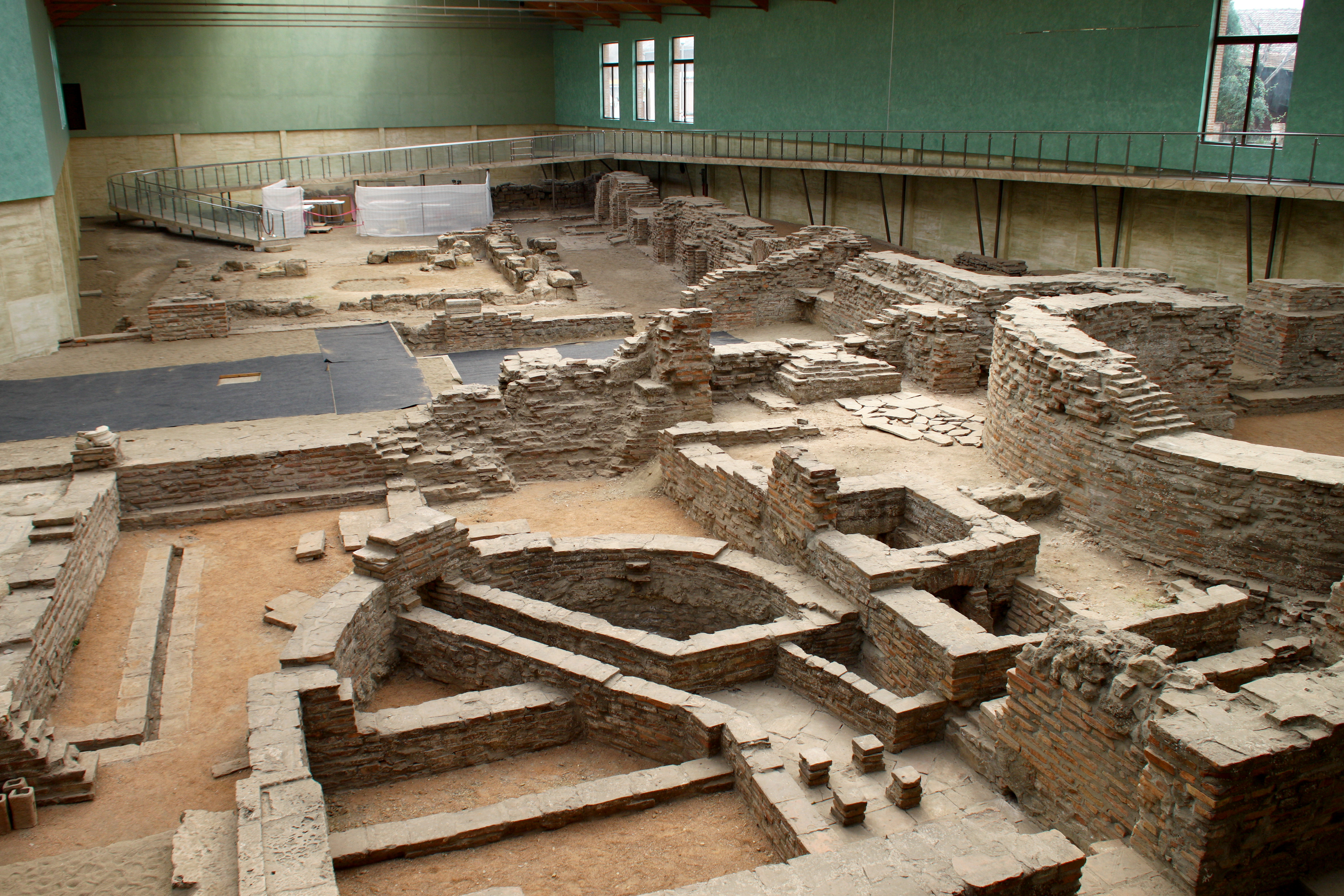
- From top, left to right: Sremska Mitrovica; Vukovar; Fruška Gora; Sirmium

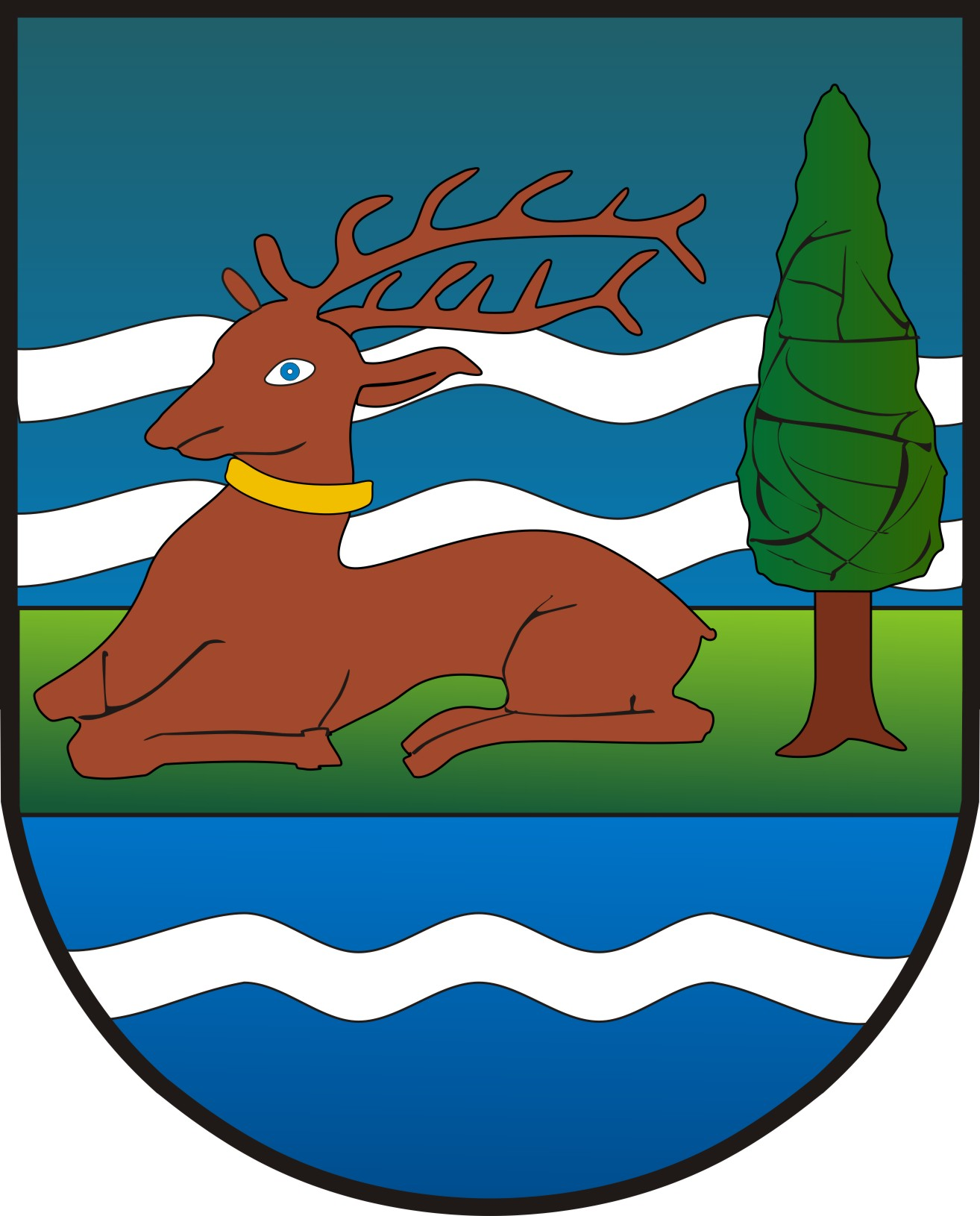
- Coat of arms

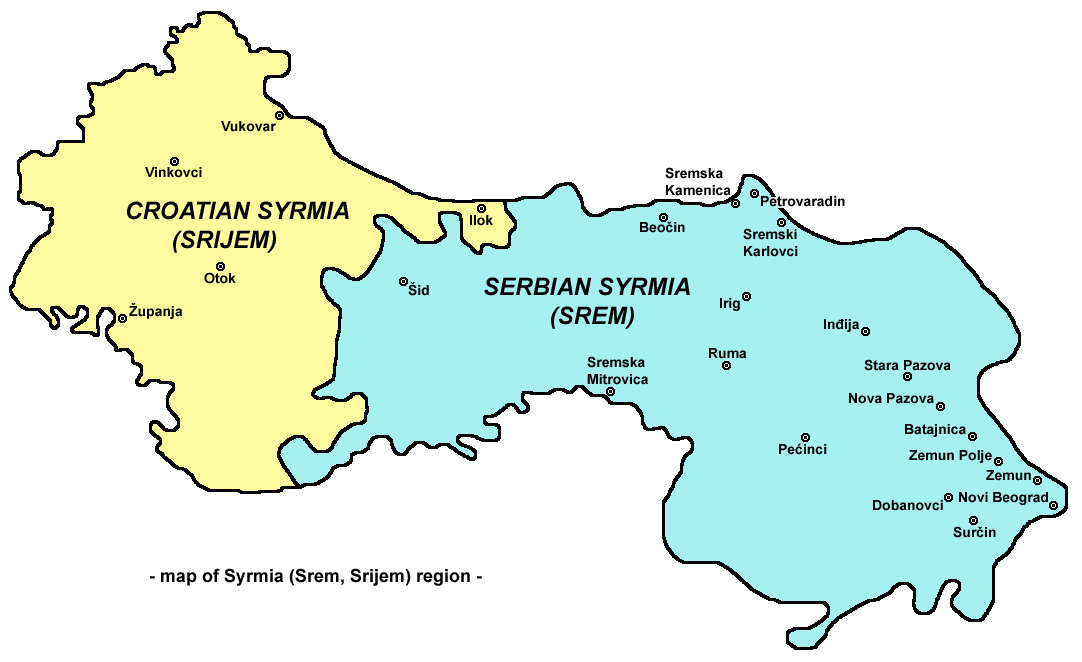
- Map of Syrmia
- Coordinates: 45°06′N 19°34′E
- Country: Serbia; Croatia
- Largest city: Sremska Mitrovica
- Time zone: UTC+1 (CET)
  - Summer (DST): UTC+2 (CEST)

Syrmia (Serbian: Срем, Srem; Croatian: Srijem; Pannonian Rusyn: Срим, romanized: Srim) is a historical region of the southern Pannonian Basin, between the Danube and Sava rivers, and is divided between Croatia and Serbia. Most of the region is flat, with the exception of the Fruška Gora low mountain range stretching along the Danube in its northern part.

== Etymology ==
The word "Syrmia" is derived from the ancient city of Sirmium (now Sremska Mitrovica). Sirmium was a Celtic or Illyrian town founded in the third century BC.

Srijem (Сријем) and Srem (Serbian Cyrillic: Срем) are used to designate the region in Serbia and Croatia respectively. Other names for the region include:

- Latin: Syrmia or Sirmium
- Hungarian: Szerémség or Szerém
- German: Syrmien
- Slovak: Sriem
- Pannonian Rusyn: Срим, romanized: Srim
- Romanian: Sirmia

== History ==
=== Prehistory ===
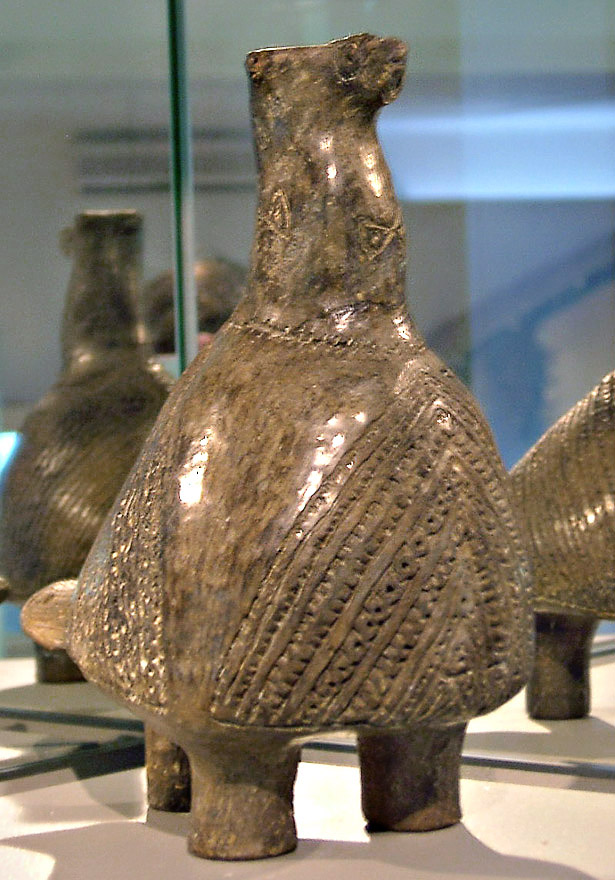
The Vučedol Dove, ritual vessel made between 2800 and 2500 BCE, symbol of Indo-European Vučedol culture centred in Syrmia (3000–2400 BC)

Between 3000 BC and 2400 BC, Syrmia was at the centre of Indo-European Vučedol culture.

=== Roman era ===
Sirmium was conquered by Romans in the first century BC and became the economic and political capital of Pannonia. In 6 AD, there was an uprising of the indigenous peoples against Roman rule. However, ten later Roman Emperors were born in Sirmium or nearby. They included Herennius Etruscus (227–251), Hostilian (230?–251), Decius Traian (249–251), Claudius II (268–270), Quintillus (270), Aurelian (270–275), Probus (276–282), Maximianus Herculius (285–310), Constantius II (337–361), and Gratian (367–383).

=== Early Middle Ages ===
In the 6th century, Syrmia was part of the Byzantine province of Pannonia. During that time, Byzantine rule was challenged by Ostrogoths and Gepids. In 567, Byzantine rule was fully restored, although it later collapsed during the Siege of Sirmium by Avars and Slavs in 582. It remained under Avar rule up to c. 800, when it came under the control of the Frankish Empire. In 827, Bulgars invaded Syrmia and continued to rule after a peace treaty in 845 AD. The region was later incorporated into the Principality of Lower Pannonia, but during the 10th century it became a battleground between Hungarians, Bulgarians, and Serbs.

At the beginning of the 11th century, the ruler of Syrmia was Duke Sermon, vassal of the Bulgarian emperor Samuel. There had been Bulgar resistance to Byzantine rule. This collapsed and Sermon, who refused to capitulate was captured and killed by Constantine Diogenes. A new but ultimately short lived area of governance named the Thema of Sirmium was established. It included the region of Syrmia and what is now Mačva. In 1071, Hungarians took over the region of Syrmia, but the Byzantine Empire reconquered the province after the victory over the Hungarians in the Battle of Sirmium. Byzantine rule ended in 1180, when Syrmia was taken again by the Hungarians.

=== Late Middle Ages ===
In the 13th century, the region was controlled by the Kingdom of Hungary. On 3 March 1229, the acquisition of Syrmia was confirmed by Papal bull. Pope Gregory IX wrote, "[Margaretha] soror…regis Ungarie [acquired] terram…ulterior Sirmia". In 1231, The Duke of Syrmia was Giletus. In the 1200s, the territory around Syrmia was divided into two counties: Syrmia in the east and Valkó (Vukovar) in the west.

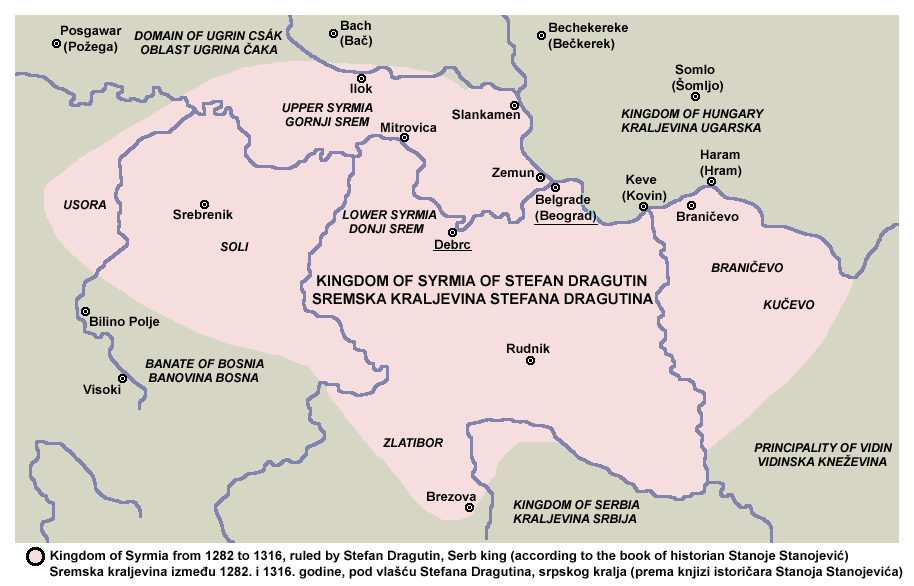
Realm of Stefan Dragutin

Between 1282 and 1316, Syrmia was ruled by Stefan Dragutin of Serbia. Initially, Dragutin was a vassal of Hungary but later ruled independently. Dragutin died in 1316, and was succeeded by his son, Stefan Vladislav II (1316–1325). In 1324, Vladislav II was defeated by Stefan Uroš III Dečanski of Serbia. Lower Syrmia became the subject of dispute between the kingdoms of Serbia and Hungary.

In 1404, Sigismund, Holy Roman Emperor ceded part of Syrmia to Stefan Lazarević of Serbia.

From 1459, the Hungarian kings endorsed the House of Branković and later, the Berislavići Grabarski family as the titular heads of the Serbian Despotate of which Syrmia was a part. They resided in Kupinik (modern-day Kupinovo). The local rulers included Vuk Grgurević (1471 to 1485); Đorđe Branković (1486 to 1496), Jovan Branković (1496 to 1502), Ivaniš Berislavić (1504 to 1514), and Stjepan Berislavić (1520 to 1535). In 1522, the last of the titular Serbian despots in Syrmia, Stjepan Berislavić, moved to Slavonia, ahead of invading Ottoman forces. Another important local governor was Laurence of Ilok, Duke of Syrmia (1477 to 1524), who reigned over large parts of the region from Ilok.

=== Early modern period ===
In 1521, parts of Syrmia fell to the Ottomans and by 1538, the entire region was under Ottoman control. Between 1527 and 1530, Radoslav Čelnik ruled Syrmia as an Ottoman vassal. The area of Ottoman administration in Syrmia was known as the Sanjak of Syrmia.

In 1699, the Habsburg monarchy took western Syrmia from the Ottomans as part of the Treaty of Karlowitz. Until the Treaty of Passarowitz at the end of the Austro-Turkish War of 1716-18, remainder of Syrmia was part of the Habsburg Military Frontier.

At the end of the Austro-Russian–Turkish War (1735–1739), members of the Kelmendi tribe migrated to Syrmia after prolonged conflicts, Settling primarily in the villages of Nikinci and Hrtkovci, they became known as the Clementines and preserved the Albanian language and aspects of their tribal identity well into the 20th century, with Albanian still recorded as a spoken language among them in 1921.

In 1745, the Syrmia County was established as part of the Habsburg Kingdom of Slavonia. During the Austro-Turkish War (1788-1791), there were émigrés from Serbia who settled in Syrmia.

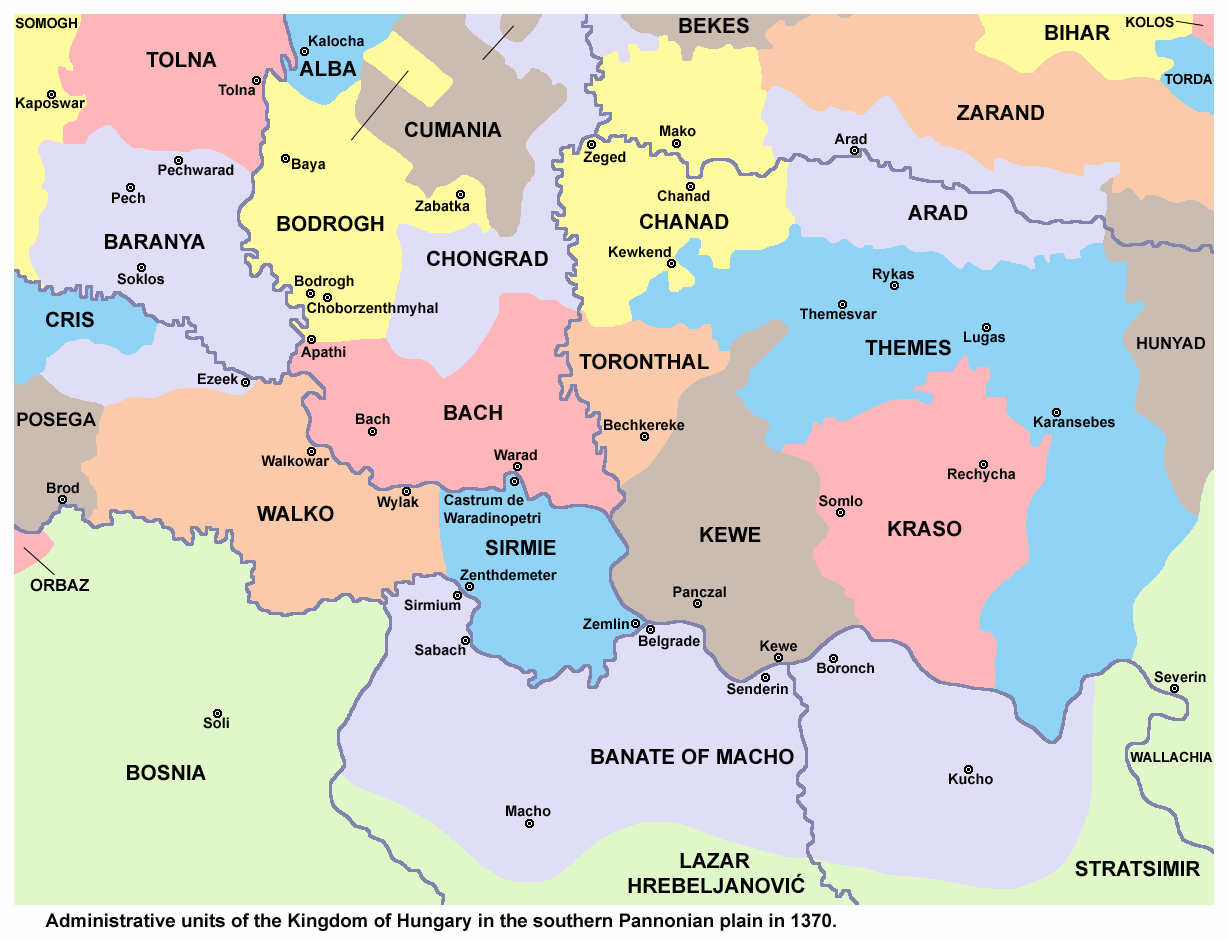
Szerém and Valkó counties, 1370

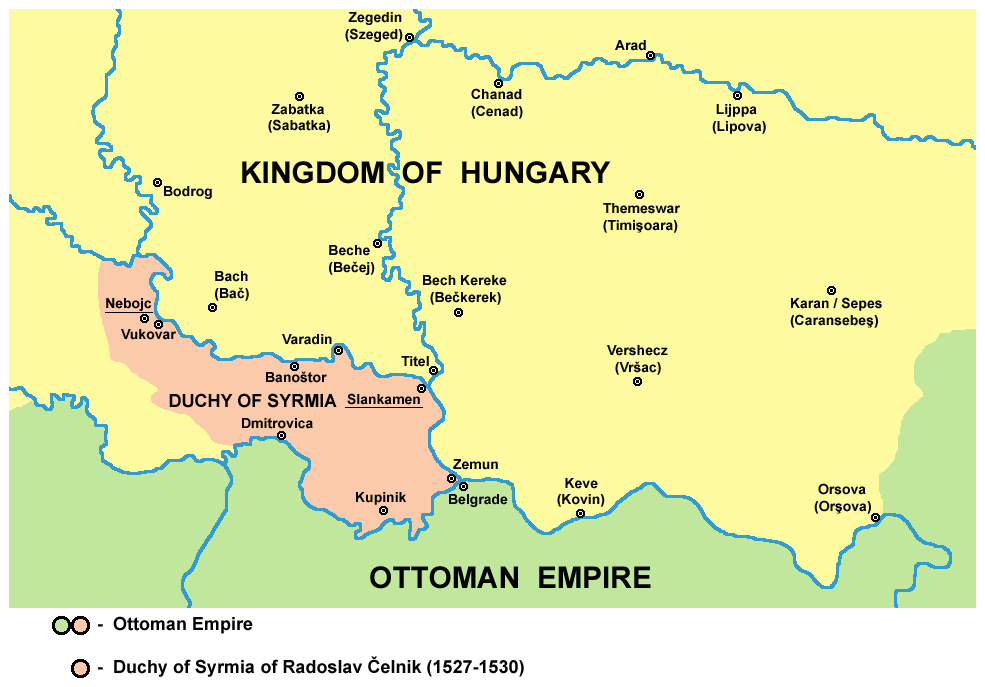
Duchy of Syrmia of Radoslav Čelnik, 1527 to 1530

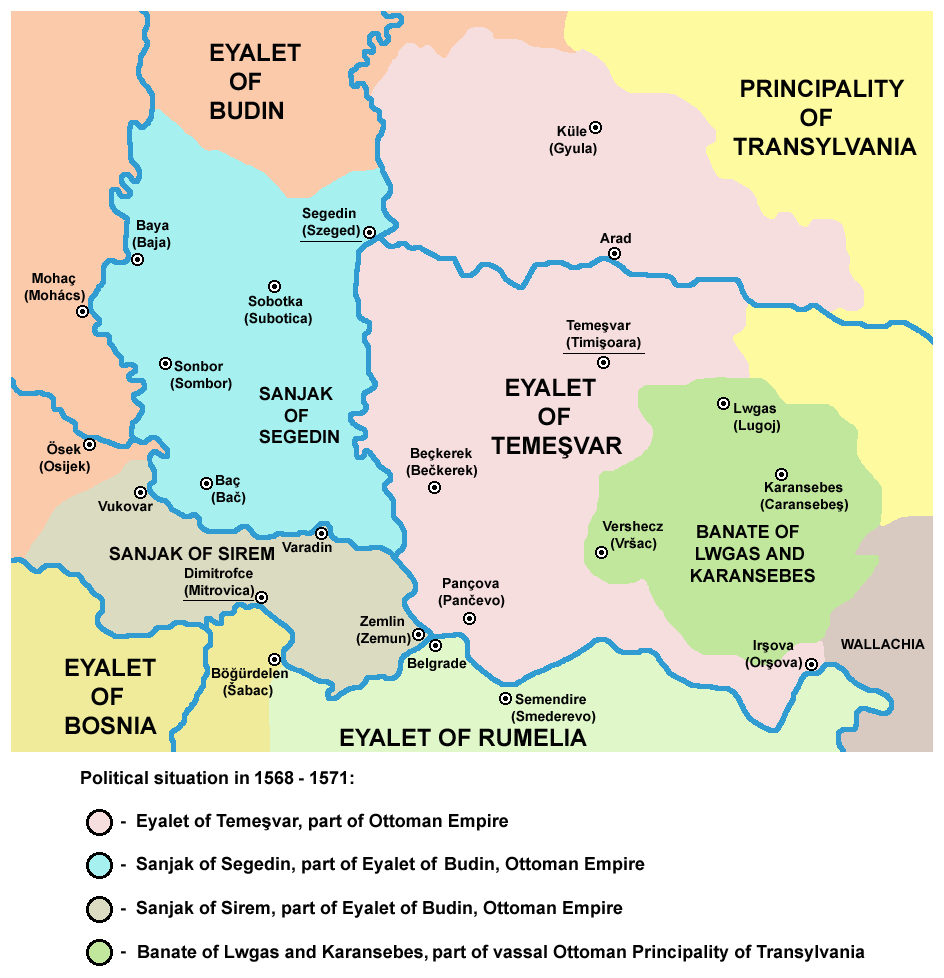
Sanjak of Syrmia, 1568 to 1571

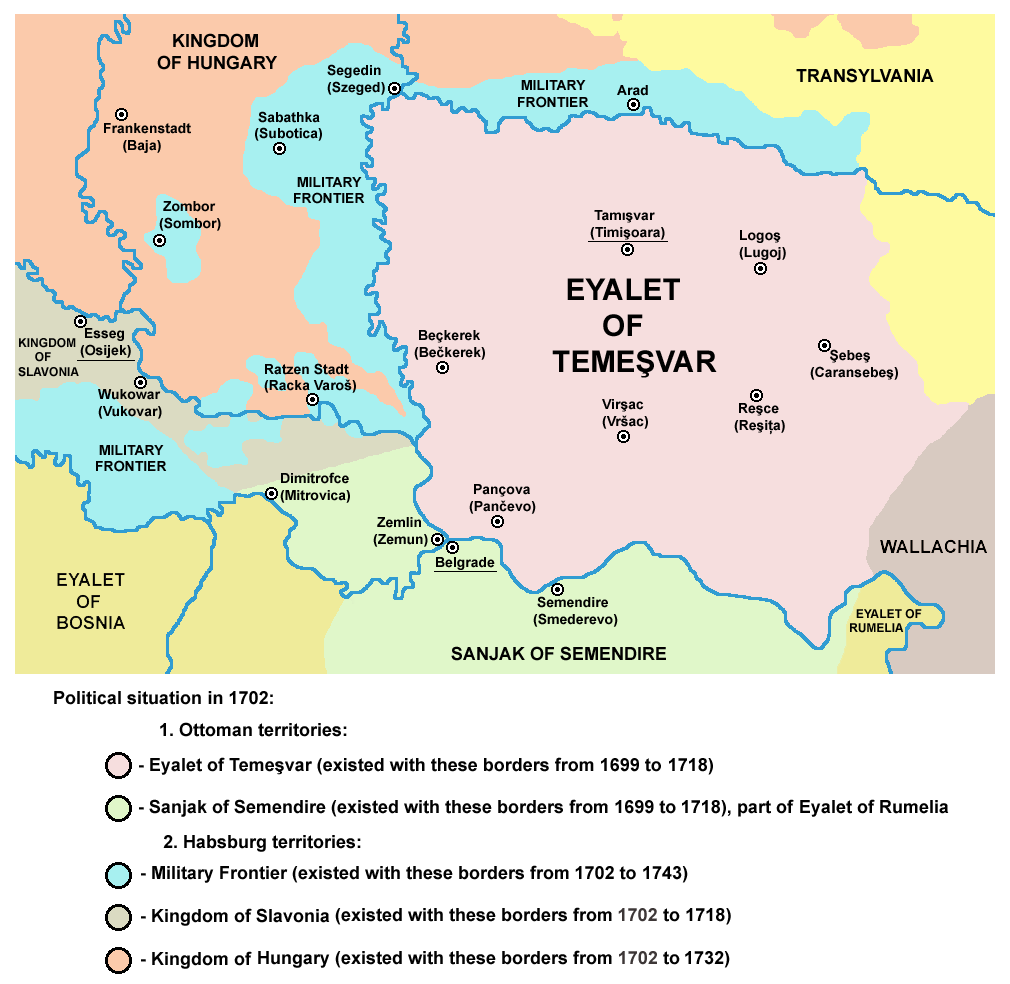
Habsburg-Ottoman frontier in Syrmia, 1699

=== 19th century ===
In 1807, the Tican's Rebellion, a Syrmian peasant uprising, occurred on Ruma estate and in the village of Voganj in Ilok estate.

In 1848, most of Syrmia was part of short-lived Serbian Vojvodina, a Serb autonomous region within the Austrian Empire. By a 1849 decree of the Emperor Franz Joseph, the Voivodeship of Serbia and Banat of Temeschwar was created, comprising Northern Syrmia, including Ilok and Ruma.

After 1860, the Syrmia County was re-established and returned to the Kingdom of Slavonia. In 1868, the Kingdom of Slavonia became part of Croatia-Slavonia in the Kingdom of Hungary.

The County of Syrmia within Croatia-Slavonia, 1881

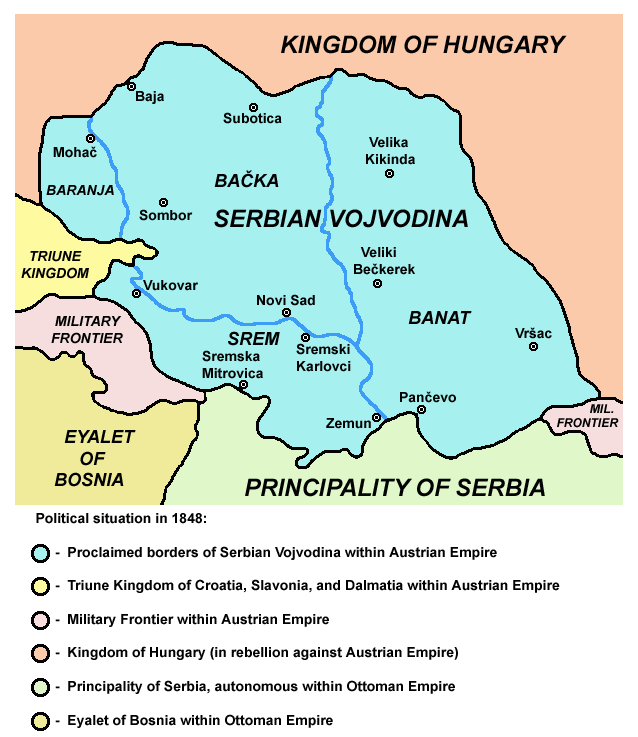
Serbian Voivodship, 1848

=== 20th century ===
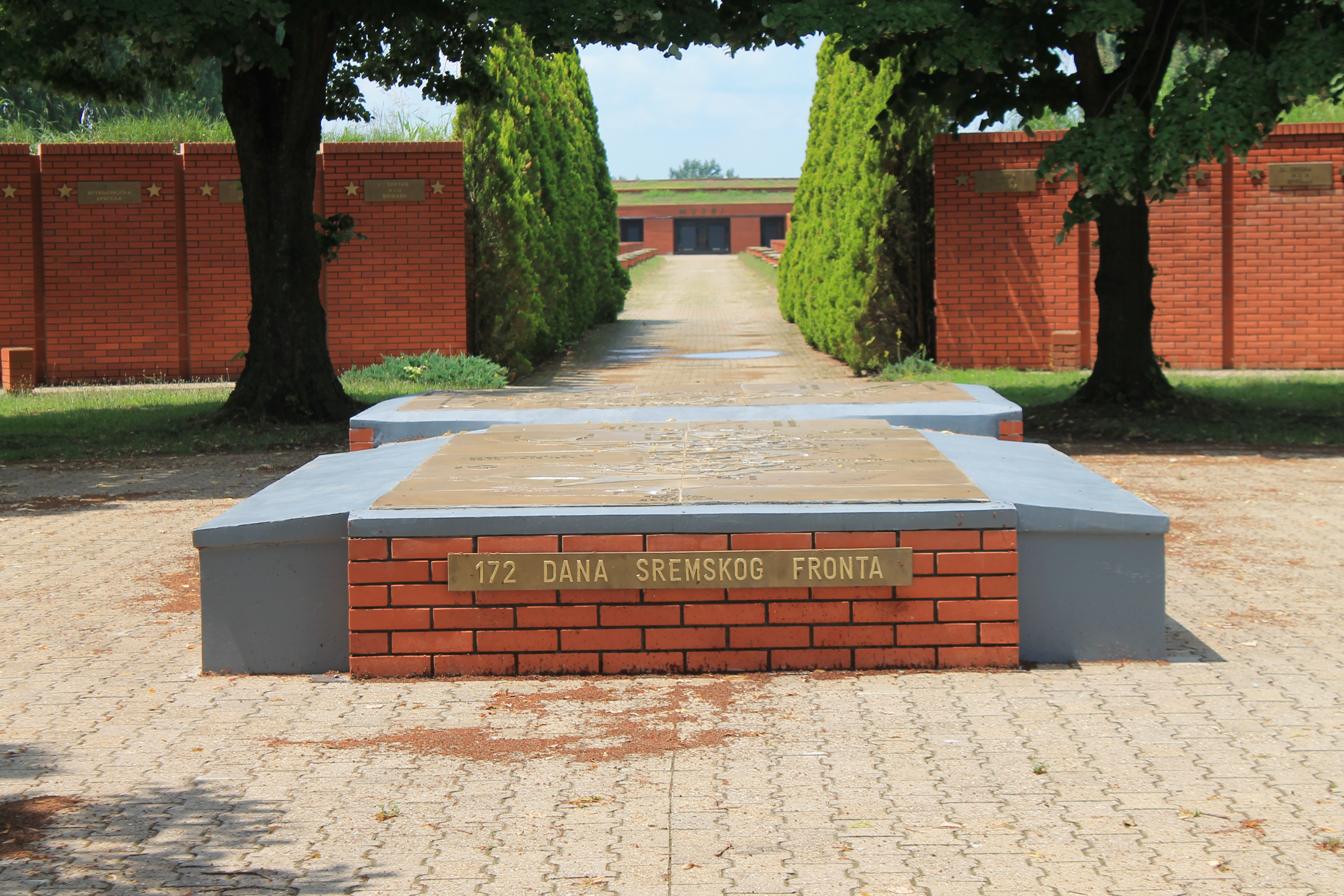
Memorial to the World War II Syrmian Front operation, near Šid

On 29 October 1918, Syrmia became a part of the newly independent State of Slovenes, Croats and Serbs. On 24 November 1918, the Assembly of Syrmia proclaimed the unification of Serb-populated parts of Syrmia with the Kingdom of Serbia. However, from 1 December 1918, all of Syrmia was made a part of the Kingdom of Serbs, Croats, and Slovenes.

From 1918 to 1922, Syrmia remained within the Kingdom of Serbs, Croats, and Slovenes and from 1922 to 1929, Syrmia was a province (oblast). In 1929, after a new territorial division, Syrmia was divided between Danube Banovina and Drina Banovina, in the Kingdom of Yugoslavia and in 1931, it was divided between Danube Banovina and Sava Banovina. In 1939, the western part of Syrmia was included into the newly formed Banovina of Croatia.

In 1941, Syrmia was occupied by the World War II Axis powers and its entire territory was ceded to the Independent State of Croatia, a Nazi puppet state. The fascist Ustashe regime systematically murdered Serbs (as part of the Genocide of the Serbs), Jews (The Holocaust), Roma (The Porajmos), and some political dissidents. Nowhere in occupied Europe were more church-historical monuments destroyed than in the Independent State of Croatia. The greatest destruction took place in Srem. The Ustashe occupiers targeted parish churches and the monasteries of Fruška Gora, which housed rich treasuries and libraries. Their goal was the eradication of historical traces of the Serb presence in these areas.

In August 1942, following the joint military anti-partisan operation in the Syrmia by the Ustashe and German Wehrmacht, it turned into a massacre by the Ustasha militia that left up to 7,000 Serbs dead. Among those killed was the prominent painter Sava Šumanović, who was arrested along with 150 residents of Šid. In 1945, with the creation of new borders, eastern Syrmia became part of the People's Republic of Serbia, while western Syrmia became part of the People's Republic of Croatia.

In 1991, Croatia declared its independence from Yugoslavia, and the Croatian War of Independence ensued shortly thereafter. The Serbs in one part western Syrmia proclaimed themselves an autonomous region called the "Serbian Autonomous Region of Eastern Slavonia, Baranja and Western Syrmia". This region was one of the two Serbian autonomous regions that formed the self-declared and unrecognized Republic of Serbian Krajina. The region was ethnically cleansed of its Croat and some other non-Serb population leading to some of the most serious violations of human rights including the Lovas killings, the Tovarnik massacre, the Vukovar massacre, and other crimes. The autonomous regions lasted until 1995, when it was reintegrated into Croatia. After the war, a number of towns and municipalities in the Croatian part of Syrmia were designated Areas of Special State Concern.

== Geography ==
The western part of Syrmia is part of the Vukovar-Syrmia County in Croatia.

The majority of eastern Syrmia is located in the Srem District in Serbia. A smaller area around Novi Sad is part of the South Bačka District, and another smaller area around Novi Beograd, Zemun, and Surčin belongs to the City of Belgrade.

Syrmia's only mountain is Fruška Gora with its highest peak, Crveni Čot, at 539 m.

=== Borders ===
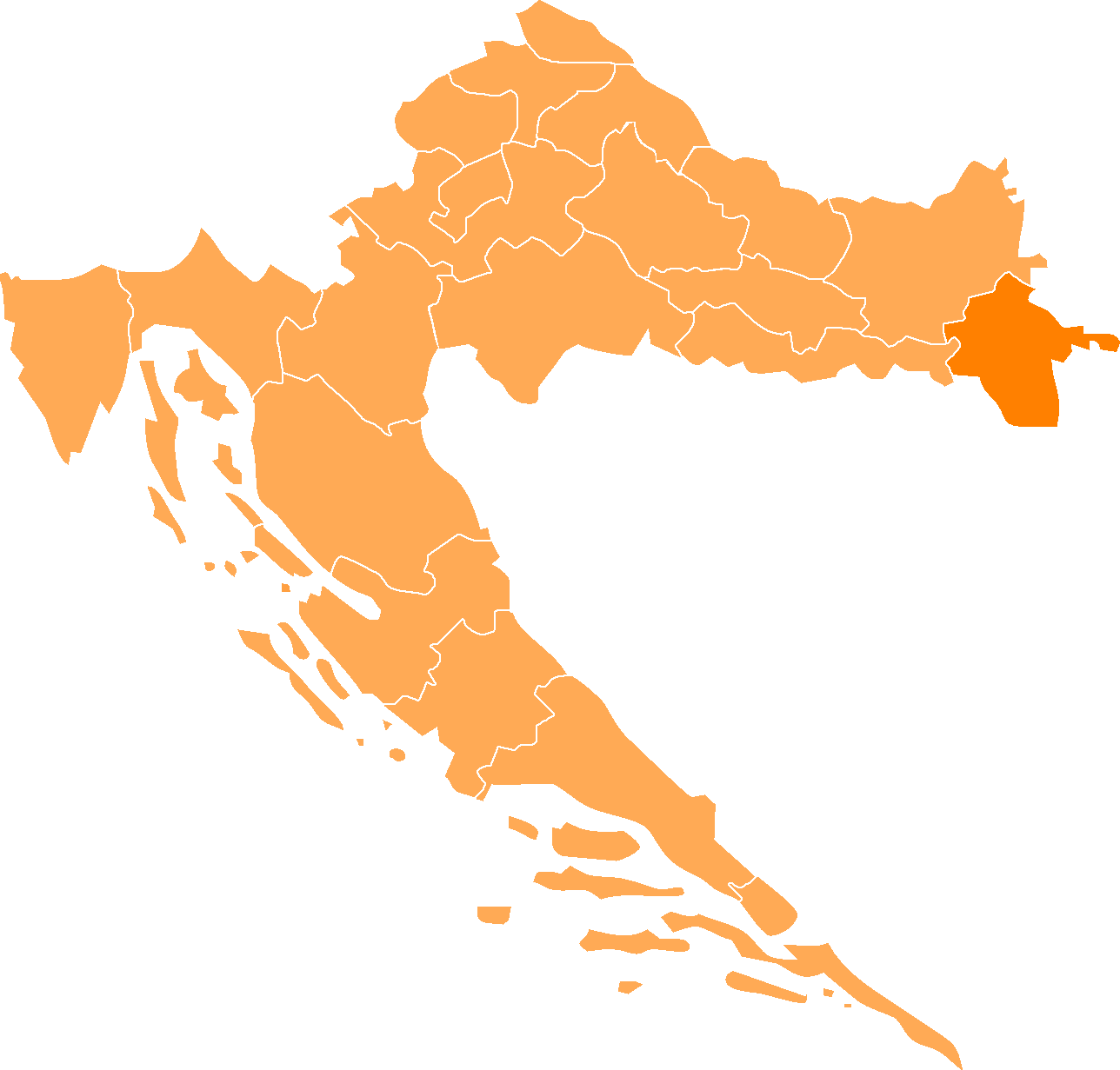
Vukovar-Srijem county within Croatia

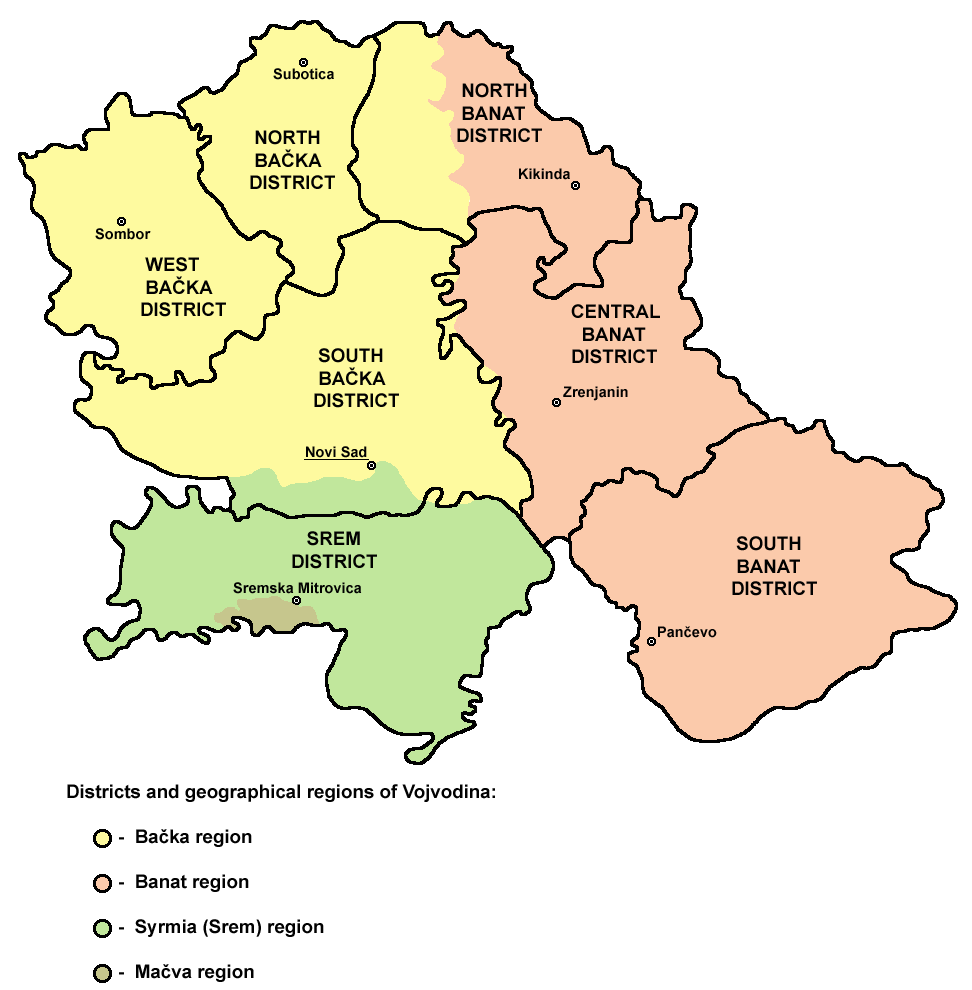
Srem District in Vojvodina

The present Croatian-Serbian border in Syrmia was drawn in 1945 by the so-called Đilas Commission. It draw the administrative border line between the Yugoslav constituent republics of Croatia and Serbia. Milovan Đilas, a Montenegrin and then a confidant of Josip Broz Tito, drew the border according to demographic criteria, which explains why the town of Ilok on the Danube, with an ethnic Croat majority, lies east of Šid in Serbia, with an ethnic Serb majority. The border drawn in 1945 was very similar to the 1931-1939 border between the Danube Banovina and the Sava Banovina within the Kingdom of Yugoslavia.

=== Bordering regions ===
- Slavonia to the west. The border between Syrmia and Slavonia runs approximately along a line through Vukovar, Vinkovci, and Županja or it follows the Bosut, Barica and Vuka rivers.
- Bačka to the north
- Banat to the east
- Šumadija the south-east
- Mačva to the south
- Semberija to the south-west

=== Cities and municipalities ===
Cities and municipalities in Croatian Syrmia:

- Vukovar
- Ilok
- Vinkovci
- Županja
- Otok
- Trpinja
- Borovo
- Tordinci
- Markušica
- Jarmina
- Ivankovo
- Vođinci
- Stari Mikanovci
- Babina Greda
- Cerna
- Gradište
- Andrijaševci
- Privlaka
- Bošnjaci
- Drenovci
- Gunja
- Vrbanja
- Nijemci
- Tovarnik
- Lovas
- Tompojevci
- Stari Jankovci
- Negoslavci
- Bogdanovci
- Nuštar

Cities and municipalities in Serbian Syrmia:

- Šid
- Sremska Mitrovica
- Irig
- Ruma
- Inđija
- Stara Pazova
- Pećinci
- Sremski Karlovci
- Petrovaradin
- Beočin

The Syrmian villages of Neštin and Vizić are part of the municipality of Bačka Palanka, the main part of which is in Bačka. Several settlements that are part of the City of Sremska Mitrovica are located in Syrmia in Mačva.

== Demographics ==
According to the 2022 census in Serbia, the territory of the Serbian part of Syrmia had a population of 339,881 inhabitants, composed of 83.5% of Serbs, 2.2% of Croats, 2.1% of Slovaks, 2% of Roma, and 1.1% of Hungarians.

According to the 2021 census in Croatia, the territory of the Croatian part of Syrmia (the Vukovar-Srijem county), had a population of 143,113 inhabitants, composed of 81.6% of Croats and 13.5% of Serbs.

=== Towns ===
List of towns in Syrmia with over 10,000 inhabitants:

- Croatia
  - Vinkovci: 28,111
  - Vukovar: 22,616
- Serbia
  - Sremska Mitrovica: 36,764
  - Ruma: 27,747
  - Inđija: 24,450
  - Stara Pazova: 18,522
  - Nova Pazova: 16,115
  - Šid: 12,618

== See also ==
- Srem District
- Vukovar-Syrmia County
- Syrmia County
- Sanjak of Syrmia
- Realm of Stefan Dragutin
- Theme of Sirmium
- Sirmium
- Vojvodina
- Slavonia
- Serbian Orthodox Eparchy of Srem
- Roman Catholic Diocese of Syrmia
- List of regions of Serbia

== Sources ==
- Ćirković, Sima (2004). The Serbs. Malden: Blackwell Publishing. ISBN 9781405142915.
- Engel, Pál (2001). The Realm of St. Stephen: A History of Medieval Hungary, 895-1526. London & New York: I.B.Tauris. ISBN 9781850439776.
- Fine, John V. A. Jr. (1991) [1983]. The Early Medieval Balkans: A Critical Survey from the Sixth to the Late Twelfth Century. Ann Arbor: University of Michigan Press. ISBN 0-472-08149-7.
- Fine, John V. A. (1994) [1987]. The Late Medieval Balkans: A Critical Survey from the Late Twelfth Century to the Ottoman Conquest. Ann Arbor, Michigan: University of Michigan Press. ISBN 978-0-472-10079-8.
- Fine, John Van Antwerp Jr. (2005). When Ethnicity Did Not Matter in the Balkans: A Study of Identity in Pre-Nationalist Croatia, Dalmatia, and Slavonia in the Medieval and Early-Modern Periods. Ann Arbor, Michigan: University of Michigan Press. ISBN 0472025600.
- Ingrao, Charles; Samardžić, Nikola; Pešalj, Jovan, eds. (2011). The Peace of Passarowitz, 1718. West Lafayette: Purdue University Press.
- Коматина, Ивана; Коматина, Предраг (2018). "Византијски и угарски Срем од X до XIII века" [The Byzantine and Hungarian Syrmia in the 10th-13th Centuries]. Зборник радова Византолошког института (in Serbian). 55: 141–164.
- Komatina, Predrag (2010). "The Slavs of the mid-Danube basin and the Bulgarian expansion in the first half of the 9th century" (PDF). Зборник радова Византолошког института. 47: 55–82.
- Petar Milošević (1981). Srem u prošlosti. Novinsko-izdavačka radna organizacija "Sremske novine.".
- Žarko Atanacković (1968). Srem u narodnooslobodilačkom ratu i socijalističkoj revoluciji. Šimanovci, Mesna zajednica-Mesni odbor SUB NOR-a.
- Đorđe Cvejić; Jovan Babović; Miodrag Živković (1982). Srem u samoupravnoj socijalističkoj Jugoslaviji 1945-1981. NIO Poslovna politika.
- Slavko Gavrilović (1979). Srem od kraja XVII do sredine XVIII veka. Filozofski fakultet u Novom Sadu, Institut za istoriju.
- Mihailo Dinić. Sredjnevekovni Srem.
- Миодраг Матицки (2007). Срем кроз векове: слојеви култура Фрушке горе и Срема : зборник радова. Вукова Задужбина. ISBN 978-86-902961-5-6.
- Слободан Ћурчић (2012). Атлас насеља Војводине: Срем. Матица српска. ISBN 978-86-7946-108-7.
- Pálosfalvi, Tamás (2018). From Nicopolis to Mohács: A History of Ottoman-Hungarian Warfare, 1389-1526. Leiden: BRILL. ISBN 9789004375659.
- Pešalj, Jovan (2010). "Early 18th-Century Peacekeeping: How Habsburgs and Ottomans Resolved Several Border Disputes after Karlowitz". Empires and Peninsulas: Southeastern Europe between Karlowitz and the Peace of Adrianople, 1699–1829. Berlin: LIT Verlag. pp. 29–42. ISBN 9783643106117.
- Radojević, Mira (1992). "Sporazum Cvetković-Maček i pitanje razgraničenja u Sremu" (PDF). Istorija 20. Veka: Časopis Instituta za savremenu istoriju. 10 (1–2): 61–72.
- Radojević, Mira (1996). "Srpsko-hrvatski spor oko Vojvodine 1918-1941" (PDF). Istorija 20. Veka: Časopis Instituta za savremenu istoriju. 14 (2): 39–73.
