= Radič Božić =

Radič Božić Радич Божић
- titular Despot of Serbia

Despot of Serbia
- Reign: 1527-1528
- Predecessor: Stjepan Berislavić
- Successor: Pavle Bakić
- Born: Serbia
- Died: September 1528; Eastern Hungarian Kingdom
- Religion: Serbian Orthodox Christian

Radič Božić (Serbian: Радич Божић, Hungarian: Radics Bosics ; fl. 1502 – September 1528) was titular Despot of Serbia, from 1527 until his death in September 1528. He was one of the most notable military commanders among Serbian nobility in the Eastern Hungarian Kingdom, and fought against the Ottoman Empire in several battles, most notably the Battle of Mohács. He never married and left no descendants.

== Life ==
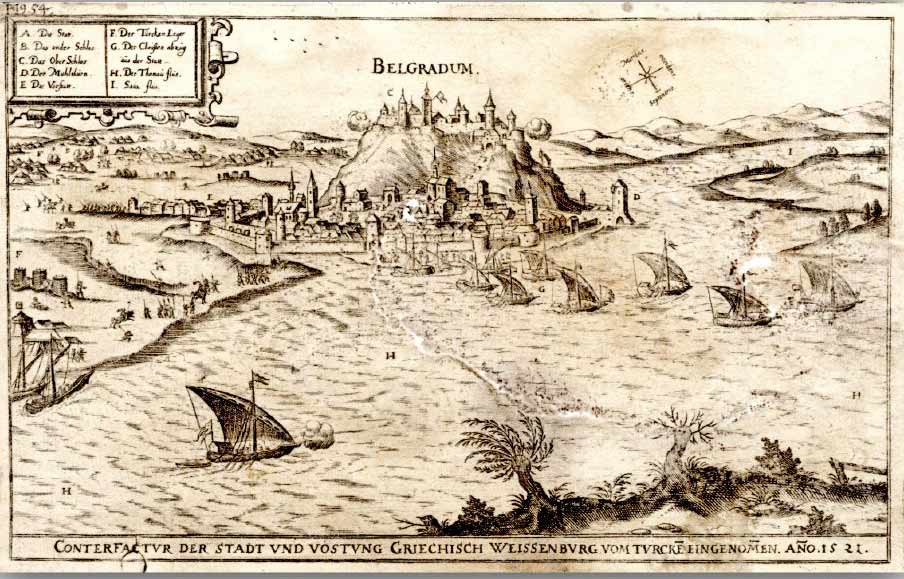
Siege of Belgrade (1521)

By the end of the 15th century, he left Ottoman-occupied Serbia for Hungary, and received the towns of Solymos and Lippa by Hungarian king. He was part of the Hungarian-Serbian army that crossed into Serbia and Bulgaria in 1502 and burnt the Ottoman bases at Braničevo, Kladovo, Vidin and Nikopol.

In 1522, shortly after the Siege of Belgrade (1521), he became the commander of a flotilla, with 500 chaiki. Together with Pál Tomori he defeated the Bosnian pasha Ferhat at Manđelos in Syrmia, on August 12, 1523. Although he already was elderly and sick, he defeated an Ottoman band at Petrovaradin in 1526, then participated in the Battle of Mohács, as well as destroying an Ottoman Army department at Titel after the battle. John Zápolya called him the most revered Serbian person in Hungary.

During the succession war between two rivals for the Hungarian crown, Ferdinand Habsburg and John Zápolya, he took the side of Zápolya, while Stjepan Berislavić (titular Despot of Serbia) opted for king Ferdinand. In 1527, king John decided to create his own Despot of Serbia, in order to attract Serbian nobility and soldiers to his side, and chose Radič, granting him the title. As new Despot of Serbia, he remained loyal to king John until his death in September 1528.

== See also ==
- History of Ottoman Serbia

Regnal titles
Preceded by Stjepan Berislavić	Serbian Despot; 1527–1528	Succeeded by Pavle Bakić

== Sources ==
- Bataković, Dušan T., ed. (2005). Histoire du peuple serbe [History of the Serbian People] (in French). Lausanne: L’Age d’Homme. ISBN 9782825119587.
- Ćirković, Sima (2004). The Serbs. Malden: Blackwell Publishing. ISBN 9781405142915.
- Dávid, Géza; Fodor, Pál, eds. (1994). Hungarian-Ottoman Military and Diplomatic Relations in the Age of Süleyman the Magnificent. Budapest: Loránd Eötvös University, Hungarian Academy of Sciences, Institute of History. ISBN 9789638312310.
- Gavrilović, Slavko (1993). "Serbs in Hungary, Slavonia and Croatia in struggles against the Turks (15th-18th centuries)". Serbs in European Civilization. Belgrade: Nova, Serbian Academy of Sciences and Arts, Institute for Balkan Studies. pp. 41–54. ISBN 9788675830153.
- Krstić, Aleksandar R. (2017). "Which Realm will You Opt for? – The Serbian Nobility Between the Ottomans and the Hungarians in the 15th Century". State and Society in the Balkans Before and After Establishment of Ottoman Rule. Belgrade: Institute of History, Yunus Emre Enstitüsü Turkish Cultural Centre. pp. 129–163. ISBN 9788677431259.
- Pálosfalvi, Tamás (2018). From Nicopolis to Mohács: A History of Ottoman-Hungarian Warfare, 1389-1526. Leiden: BRILL. ISBN 9789004375659.
