= Jelena Jakšić =

- Despotissa of Serbia
- Born: c. 1475
- Died: after 1536
- Spouses: Jovan Branković; Ivaniš Berislavić
- House: Jakšić noble family (by birth); Branković dynasty (by marriage); Berislavić noble family (by marriage)

Jelena Jakšić (Serbian Cyrillic: Јелена Јакшић; c. 1475 – after 1536) was the titular despotissa of Serbia, first by marriage with Jovan Branković, who was the titular despot of Serbia from 1493 to 1502, and then by marriage with Ivaniš Berislavić, who held the same title, from 1503 to 1514. Jelena's son (from the second marriage) Stjepan Berislavić also held the title (Despot of Serbia), from 1520 to 1535.

== Life ==
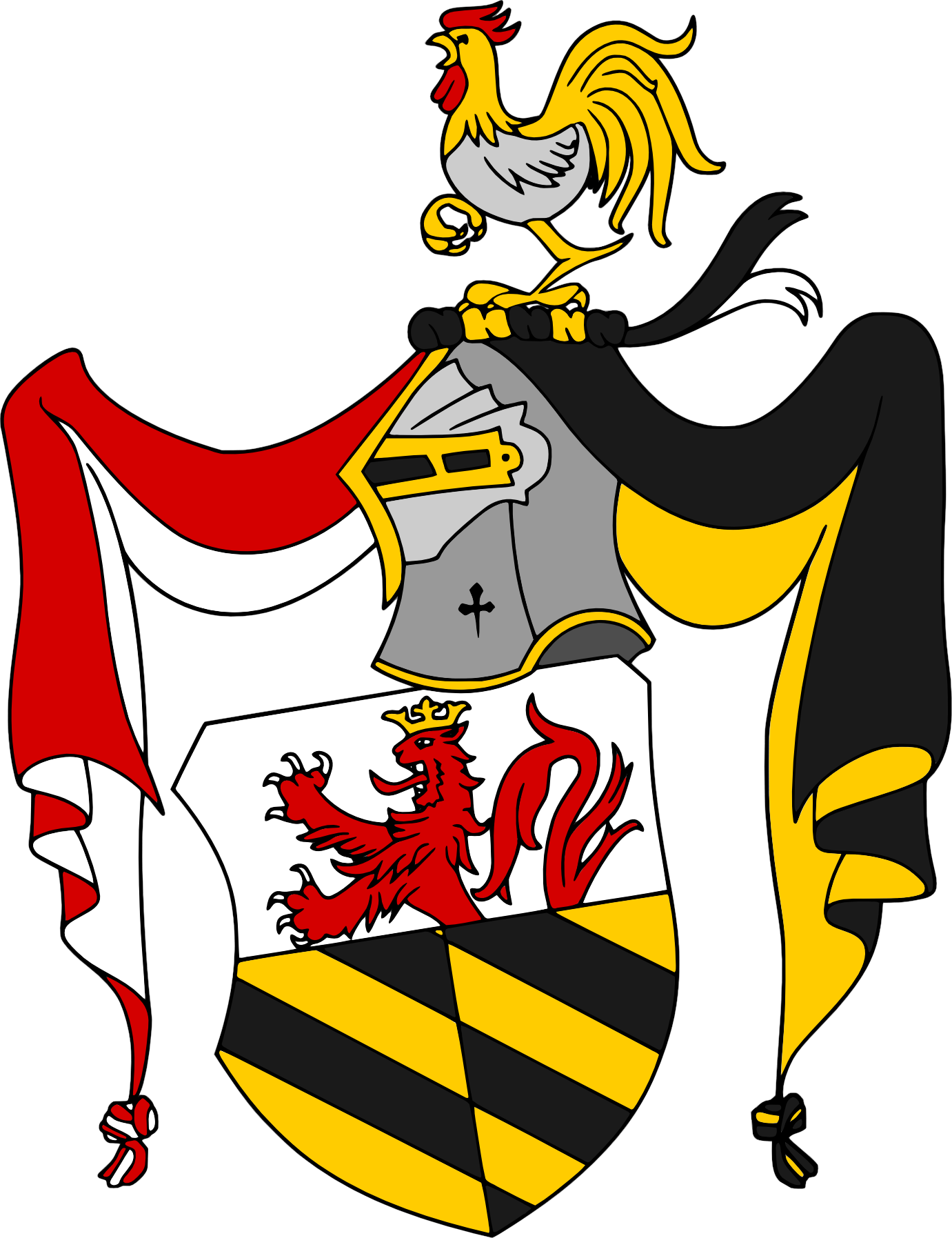
Coat of arms of the Jakšić noble family

Jelena was daughter of Stefan Jakšić (d. 1489), of the Jakšić noble family. Her father was one of the most notable Serbian nobles in the Kingdom of Hungary. In 1486, Hungarian king Matthias Corvinus (d. 1490) granted the title Despot of Serbia to Đorđe Branković, elder son of Stefan Branković (d. 1476), former Despot of Serbia (1458-1459). Soon after that, Jelena was married to Đorđe's younger brother Jovan Branković. In 1493, Jovan was also granted the title, as it was customary in the Kingdom of Hungary that various senior posts should be held jointly by two incumbents. When her husband became titular despot, she became despotissa. They lived at the castle Kupinik in the Syrmia County, and had several daughters.

In 1496, her brother in law Đorđe decided to relinquish all of his titles and possessions in favor his brother Jovan, Jelena's husband. In the same time, Đorđe took monastic vows, adopting the name Maksim (Serbian Cyrillic: Максим). Jovan remained the sole despot until 1502, when he died, without male hairs, and his widow Jelena was left with several minor daughters, trying to secure their inheritance.

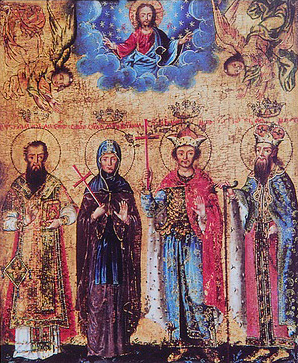
Icon from the 17th century, representing Jelena's husband Jovan Branković, and his mother, father and brother

In 1503–1504, Hungarian king Vladislaus II (d. 1516) decided to remarry Jelena to Ivaniš Berislavić (d. 1514), a prominent noble from the Požega County, granting him the title Despot of Serbia, and also transferring to him Branković family estates.

Jelena and Ivaniš had two sons and two daughters. Ivaniš died in 1514, while their sons were still minors, and Jelena took charge of family affairs, until 1520, when Hungarian king Louis II (d. 1526) appointed her elder son Stjepan Berislavić as new titular Despot of Serbia. She died sometime after 1536.

== Family ==
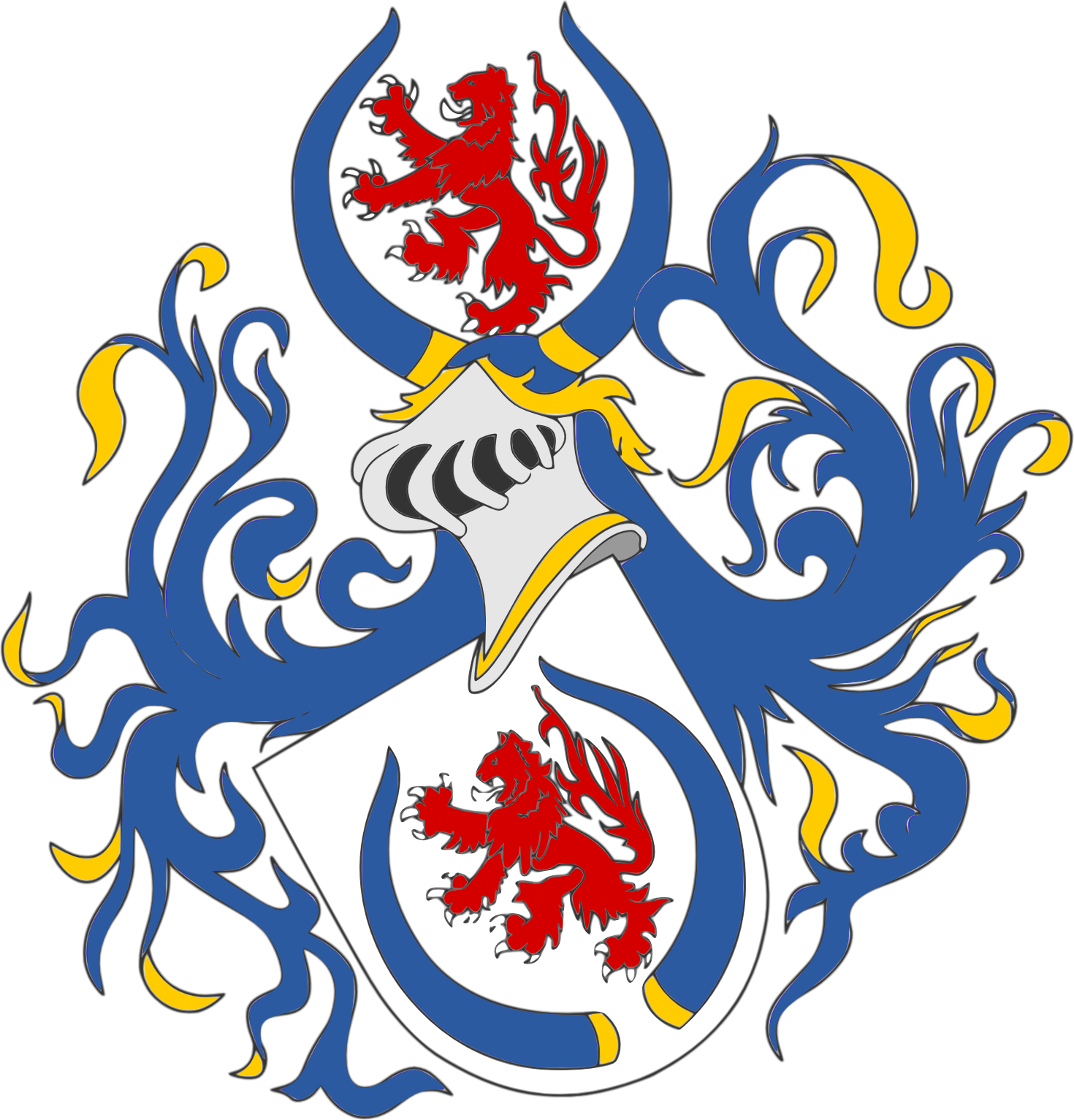
Coat of arms of the Branković dynasty

From her first marriage, with Jovan Branković (d. 1502), Jelena had several daughters:

- Marija, married to Ferdinand Frankopan, of the House of Frankopan
- Jelena, married to Peter IV Rareş, Prince of Moldavia
- Ana, married to Fiodor Sanguszko, Marshal of Volhynia
- Marija Magdalena, married to Iwan Wiśniowiecki, and later to Aleksander Fedorowicz Czartoryski, both Ruthenian nobles from Volhynia

From her second marriage, with Ivaniš Berislavić (d. 1514), Jelena also had several children:

- Stjepan Berislavić (d. 1535), titular Despot of Serbia
- Nikola Berislavić (d. after 1527)
- two daughters (names unknown)

Some researchers have suggested, after taking into account the dates of Jelena's marriages and also the dates of marriages of her daughters, that some of her daughters who are usually considered to be from her first marriage, might in fact be from her second marriage.

== Sources ==
- Bataković, Dušan T., ed. (2005). Histoire du peuple serbe [History of the Serbian People] (in French). Lausanne: L’Age d’Homme. ISBN 9782825119587.
- Ćirković, Sima (2004). The Serbs. Malden: Blackwell Publishing. ISBN 9781405142915.
- Isailović, Neven G.; Krstić, Aleksandar R. (2015). "Serbian Language and Cyrillic Script as a Means of Diplomatic Literacy in South Eastern Europe in 15th and 16th Centuries". Literacy Experiences concerning Medieval and Early Modern Transylvania. Cluj-Napoca: George Bariţiu Institute of History. pp. 185–195.
- Jireček, Constantin (1918). Geschichte der Serben. Vol. 2. Gotha: Perthes.
- Krstić, Aleksandar R. (2017). "Which Realm will You Opt for? – The Serbian Nobility Between the Ottomans and the Hungarians in the 15th Century". State and Society in the Balkans Before and After Establishment of Ottoman Rule. Belgrade: Institute of History, Yunus Emre Enstitüsü Turkish Cultural Centre. pp. 129–163. ISBN 9788677431259.
- Magina, Adrian (2018). "Acta Jakšićiana: Documents Regarding the Jakšić of Nădlac Family in Romanian Archives" (PDF). Initial: A Review of Medieval Studies (in French). 6: 159–188.
- Pilat, Liviu (2010). "Mitropolitul Maxim Brancovici, Bogdan al III-lea şi legăturile Moldovei cu Biserica sârbă". Analele Putnei (in Romanian). 6 (1): 229–238. Archived from the original on 2022-03-31.
- Spremić, Momčilo (2004). "La famille serbe des Branković - considérations généalogiques et héraldiques" (PDF). Зборник радова Византолошког института (in French). 41: 441–452.
- Stojkovski, Boris; Ivanić, Ivana; Spăriosu, Laura (2018). "Serbian-Romanian Relations in the Middle Ages until the Ottoman Conquest" (PDF). Transylvanian Review. 27 (2): 217–229. Archived from the original (PDF) on 2022-01-21.
- Wasilewski, Tadeusz (1963). "Przyczynki źródłowe do stosunków Polski ze Słowiańszczyzną południową w wiekach XIII-XVI" (PDF). Studia Źródłoznawcze. 8: 117–124.
- Zabolotnaia, Lilia (2010). "Câteva precizări despre dinastia Branković". Tyragetia. 4 (2): 115–122.
