= Bosnia (region) =

Bosnia Bosna Босна
- Region
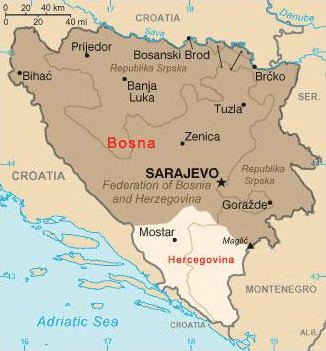
- Approximate borders between two modern-day regions of Bosnia and Herzegovina - Bosnia (marked dark brown) and Herzegovina (marked light brown)
- Coordinates: 44.16°N 17.78°E
- Country: Bosnia and Herzegovina
- Largest cities: Sarajevo, Banja Luka

Area
  - Total: 39,021 km^{2} (15,066 sq mi)

Population
  - Estimate (2013): c. 3 million
- Demonym: Bosnian
- Time zone: UTC+1 (CET)
  - Summer (DST): UTC+2 (CEST)

Bosnia (Serbo-Croatian: Bosna / Босна, pronounced [bɔ̂sna]) is the northern region of Bosnia and Herzegovina, encompassing roughly 76% of the country; the other region, the southern part, is Herzegovina.

The two regions have formed a geopolitical entity since medieval times, and the name "Bosnia" commonly occurs in historical and geopolitical senses as generally referring to both regions (Bosnia and Herzegovina). The official use of the combined name started only in the late period of Ottoman rule.

== Geography ==
Bosnia lies mainly in the Dinaric Alps, ranging to the southern borders of the Pannonian plain, with the rivers Sava and Drina marking its northern and eastern borders.

The area of Bosnia comprises approximately 39,021 km^{2}, and makes up about 80% of the territory of the present-day state of Bosnia and Herzegovina. There are no true borders between the region of Bosnia and the region of Herzegovina. Unofficially, Herzegovina is south of the mountain Ivan planina. According to another unofficial definition, Herzegovina encompasses the watersheds of the Neretva and Trebišnjica rivers.

== History ==
The central part of Bosnia was inhabited by Neolithic farmers that belonged to the Kakanj culture, and later replaced by another neolithic culture called the Butmir culture. The first Indo-Europeans are thought to be members of eneolithic Vučedol culture.

In the Bronze Age the area is thought to have been inhabited by Iron Age Central Bosnian cultural group and Glasinac culture. Later on the Illyrian tribe of the Daesitiates would become dominant in these area.

The historical records of the region are scarce until its first recorded standalone (domestic) ruler and viceroy of Bosnian state, Ban Borić, was appointed in 1154.

De Administrando Imperio describes a small Serbian župa of Bosona (Greek: χωρίον Βόσονα) that was located around the river Bosna in the modern-day fields of Sarajevo and of Visoko.

Expansion of the Bosnian Kingdom

At the end of the 14th century, under Tvrtko I of Bosnia, the Bosnian kingdom included most of the territory of today's Bosnia and of what would later become known as Herzegovina.

The kingdom lost its independence to the Ottoman Empire in 1463. The region of Bosnia's westernmost city at the time of the conquest was Jajce.

The Ottoman Empire initially expanded into Bosnia and Herzegovina through a territory called the Bosansko Krajište. It was transformed into the Sanjak of Bosnia and the Sanjak of Herzegovina after 1462/1463. The first Ottoman administration called Eyalet of Bosnia was finally formed in 1527, after long armed resistance to the north and to the west by Counts Franjo and Ivaniš Berislavić of the noble house of Berislavići Grabarski.

Eventually, following the Great Turkish War, in the 18th century the Eyalet came to encompass the area largely matching that of today's Bosnia and Herzegovina.

In 1833, the Eyalet of Herzegovina was temporarily split off under Ali-paša Rizvanbegović. The area acquired the name of "Bosnia and Herzegovina" in 1853 as a result of a twist in political events following his death. After the 1864 administrative reform, the province was named Vilayet of Bosnia. Austria-Hungary occupied the whole vilayet in 1878. It remained formally part of the Ottoman Empire under the title of Condominium of Bosnia and Herzegovina until 1908, when Austria-Hungary provoked the Bosnian crisis by formally annexing the province.

Since 1918, Bosnia was part of Yugoslavia which was initially the Kingdom of Yugoslavia ruled by a Serbian Dynasty. It was occupied during the second world war by the Axis powers before being librated in 1943 by the resistance leader and communist party member Josip Broz Tito. Bosnia remained part of the Socialist Federal Republic of Yugoslavia until its break-away from the inter-ethnic Yugoslav wars (1992-2001) and particularly the Bosnian War (1992-1995) which included the Bosnian Genocide with wide-spread ethnic cleansing of the Bosniak (Bosnian muslims) and Bosnian Croats. This led to the declaration of independence of Bosnia and Herzegovina (1992).

== Regional identity ==
Within Bosnia and Herzegovina, the region of Bosnia has a traditional regional identity, distinctive from the regional identity of the neighboring Herzegovina. Bosnian regional identity was attested as early as the 10th century, when Constantin VII Porphyrogenetos referred to Bosnia as a particular region. Development of Bosnia's regional identity continued throughout the Middle Ages, and it was also acknowledged in the 15th century by the Ottoman conquerors, who created the Sanjak of Bosnia in 1463, giving it a regional name, which was not always the case. By the end of the Ottoman rule (1878), regional Bosnianhood became a distinctive mark of local identity, that transcended traditional ethnic and religious distinctions within the general population of Bosnia, and the same notion of regional Bosniandom was preserved throughout the periods of Austro-Hungarian (1878–1918) and Yugoslav (1918–1992) rule.

== Subregions ==
- Podrinje, eastern
- Bosanska Krajina, northwestern
- Central Bosnia, central
- Posavina, northernmost
- Semberija, northeastern
- Tropolje, western

== See also ==
- History of Bosnia
- Herzegovina

== Sources ==
- Fine, John V. A. Jr. (1991) [1983]. The Early Medieval Balkans: A Critical Survey from the Sixth to the Late Twelfth Century. Ann Arbor: University of Michigan Press. ISBN 0-472-08149-7.
- Fine, John V. A. (1994) [1987]. The Late Medieval Balkans: A Critical Survey from the Late Twelfth Century to the Ottoman Conquest. Ann Arbor, Michigan: University of Michigan Press. ISBN 978-0-472-10079-8.
- Donia, Robert J.; Fine, John Van Antwerp Jr. (1994). Bosnia and Hercegovina: A Tradition Betrayed. New York: Columbia University Press.
- Moravcsik, Gyula, ed. (1967) [1949]. Constantine Porphyrogenitus: De Administrando Imperio (2nd revised ed.). Washington D.C.: Dumbarton Oaks Center for Byzantine Studies. ISBN 9780884020219. Archived from the original on 2023-01-20.
- Mrgić-Radojčić, Jelena (2004). "Rethinking the Territorial Development of the Medieval Bosnian State". Историјски часопис. 51: 43–64. Archived from the original on 2023-02-15.
- Ramet, Pedro (1989) [1984]. "Religion and Nationalism in Yugoslavia". Religion and Nationalism in Soviet and East European Politics (2 ed.). Durham-London: Duke University Press. pp. 299–327. ISBN 0822308916. Archived from the original on 2023-02-15.
- Živković, Tibor (2010). "On the Beginnings of Bosnia in the Middle Ages". Spomenica akademika Marka Šunjića (1927-1998). Sarajevo: Filozofski fakultet. pp. 161–180. Archived from the original on 2020-08-09.
