= Berislav =

- Gender: Male

Origin
- Origin: Slavic
- Meaning: beri ("he/she carries") + slava ("glory, fame")

Other names
- Variant form: Berislava {f}
- Related names: Berivoj, Beridrag

Berislav (also spelled Berisav) is a Slavic masculine given name derived from beri "he/she carries" and slava "glory, fame". Feminine form is Berislava.

The following notable people have this name:

- Berislav Rončević - Bosnian Croat politician

The following places have names that derive from the name:

- Berislavec - village in Zagreb County
- Berislăvești - commune in Vâlcea County, Romania
- Beryslav - city in Kherson Oblast of southern Ukraine.

The Berislavić medieval Croatian noble family was named after a Berislav.

== See also ==
- Slavic names
