= Stjepan Berislavić =

Titular Despot of Serbia from 1520 to 1535

Despot of Serbia
- Reign: 1520–1535 (titular)
- Predecessor: Ivaniš Berislavić
- Successor: Pavle Bakić
- Born: c. 1505
- Died: 1535 (aged 29–30)
- Spouse: Catherine Batthyany
- House: Berislavići Doborski
- Mother: Jelena Jakšić

Stjepan Berislavić (Serbian: Стефан Бериславић, Hungarian: Beriszló István; c. 1505 – 1535) was a Croatian nobleman and titular Despot of Serbia from 1520 until his death in 1535. He was a prominent nobleman in several counties (Syrmia, Vukovar and Požega) of Kingdom of Hungary.

== Family ==
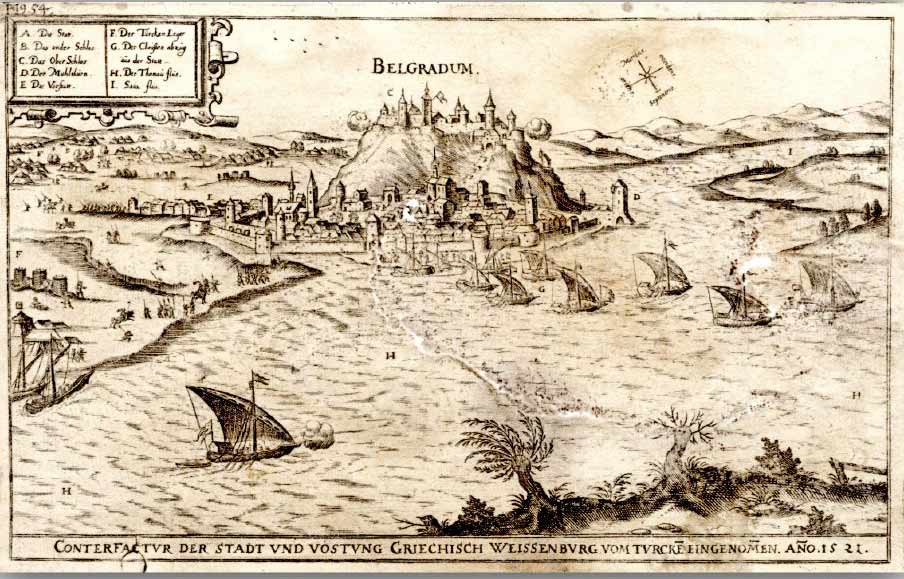
Siege of Belgrade (1521)

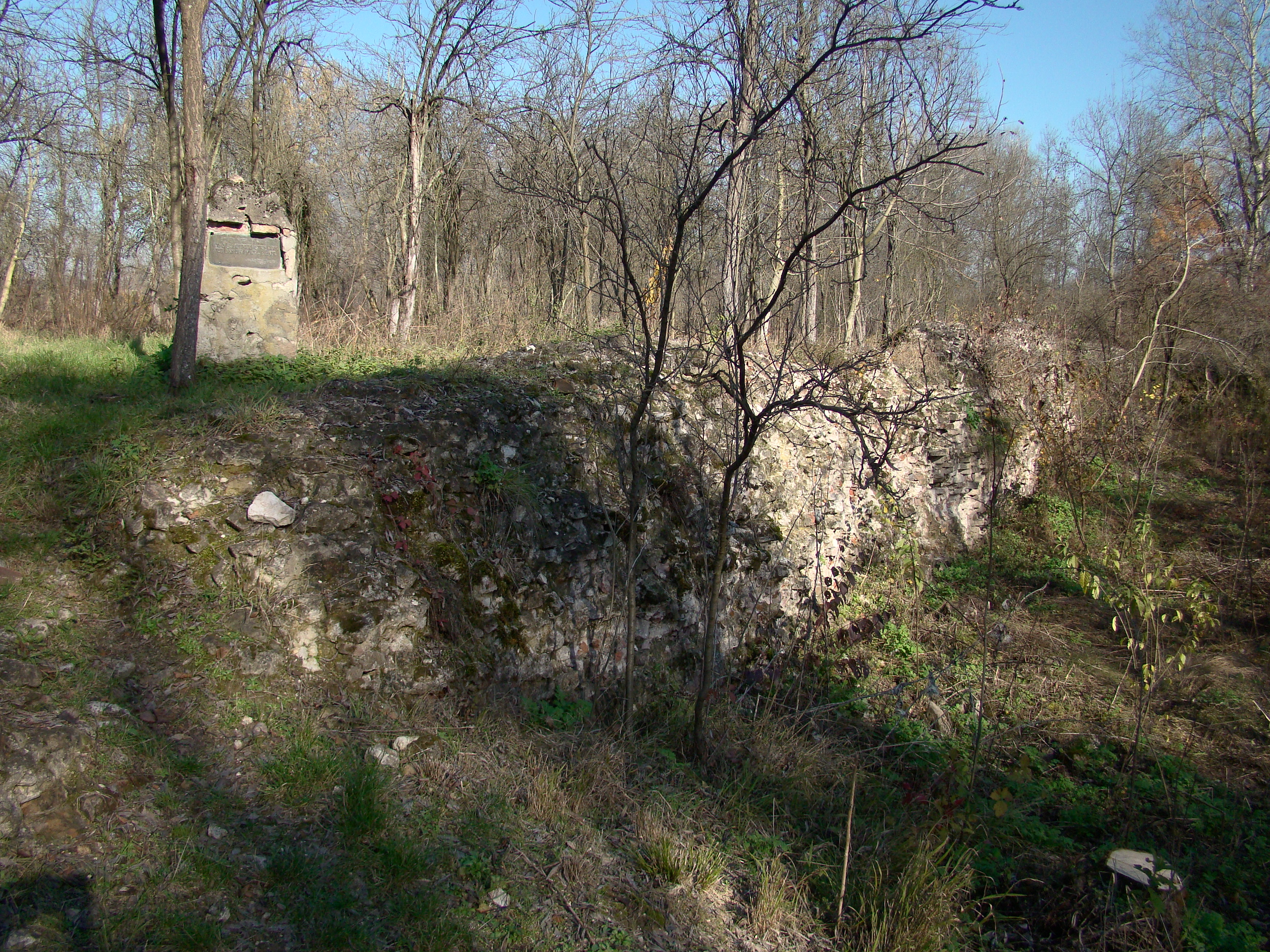
Ruins of Kupinik fortress, once court of Stjepan Berislavić, destroyed by Suleiman the Magnificent in 1521 during the Siege of Belgrade

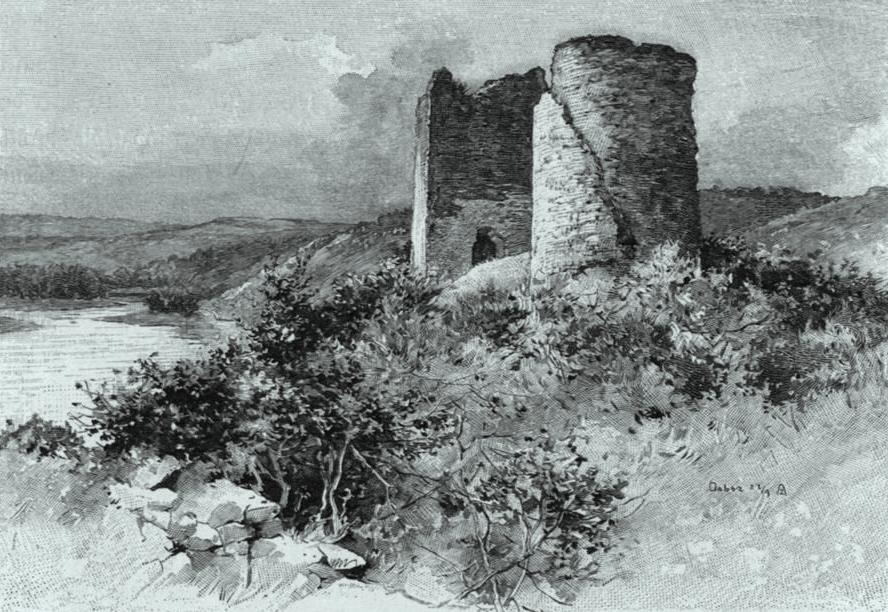
Ruins of strategic Dobor fortress, Stjepan Berislavić's Bosnian court near Modriča, besieged by Sigismund nine times from 1394 to 1410, destroyed finally by Austria in 1716

Stjepan Berislavić was member of the noble family Berislavići Doborski, that expanded from Bosnia into the Požega County of Kingdom of Hungary. According to the family tradition Ban Borić of Bosnia, who ruled from 1154 until c.1167, was an ancestor of the family.

Their royal title was Ban of Bosnia (Ban de Bosna), while noble titles were Lord of Posavina (Signor de Posava) and Perpetual Count of Dobor (Comes Perpetuus de Dobor).

Stjepan was the elder son of Ivaniš Berislavić (d. 1514), who was Ban of Jajce (1511–1513) and titular Despot of Serbia (1504–1514).

Stjepan's mother was Jelena Jakšić, a member of the Serbia's prominent Jakšić noble family, who had previously been married to Jovan Branković, the last Serbian Despot of the Branković dynasty (1496–1502). As Jelena and his first husband had no male issue, the title of Serbian Despot became vacant upon Jovan's death in 1502. When Jelena remarried to Ivaniš Berislavić in 1504, he received the title, from king Vladislaus II (d. 1516), and held it until his death in 1514.

== Regnal ascensions ==
From 1529, he has controlled regions in Slavonian Posavina, centered in Brod. During 1532 and 1533, he negotiated with king Ferdinand Habsburg, but no agreement was reached.

=== Serbia (titular) ===
Since Stjepan was c. nine years old when his father died, the title of Serbian Despot was granted to him only in 1520, by king Louis II (d. 1526). After the Ottoman conquest of Belgrade in 1521, he tried to hold his fortress of Kupinik in Syrmia county, but the region was eventually lost to Ottoman invasion.

After the defeat at the Battle of Mohács (1526), Kingdom of Hungary became divided between two rival fractions, one led by King Ferdinand Habsburg and the other by John Zápolya, the Duke of Transylvania, who was also proclaimed King. At first, Stjepan Berislavić supported Zápolya (1526), but then pledged allegiance to Ferdinand, at the beginning of 1527. Learning of that, Zapolja tried to suppress Stjepan's authority over Serbs by appointing Serbian nobleman Radič Božić as titular Despot (1527–1528). In spite of that, Stjepan continued to act as Serbian Despot, and was recognized as such by King Ferdinand. In 1529, Stjepan fell out of Ferdinand's favor and was confined in Buda, but soon escaped.

At that time, Ferdinand's territories in Hungary were invaded again by the Ottomans, who acted as allies of rival king John Zápolya, ruler of the Eastern Hungarian Kingdom. Stjepan decided to join them, and in return received confirmation of his domains.

== Death and legacy ==
During the invasion, Stjepan was killed by janissary on the orders from the Turkish governor of Bosnia Gazi Husrev Bey, and his domain was conquered by the Ottomans.

In a letter written from Stoni Beograd, dated 1 May 1542, his widow, Catherine Batthyany (d. after 1542), former Despotess of Serbia informs her brother, Ferenc Batthyány, former Ban of Croatia, that Murat Bey Tardić already conquered Orahovica and that she fears she will soon fall into the hands of the Ottomans.

== Ancestors ==
Ancestors of Stjepan Berislavić

2. Ivaniš Berislavić
1. Stjepan Berislavić
12. Jakša
6. Stefan Jakšić
3. Jelena Jakšić
14. Miloš Belmužević
7. Milica Belmužević

Regnal titles
Preceded by Ivaniš Berislavić	titular Despot of Serbia; 1520–1535	Succeeded by Pavle Bakić

== Annotations ==
- Name: Serbian historiography uses Stefan or Stevan, while Croatian historiography uses Stjepan. In Hungarian historiography, his full name is written as Beriszló István.

== Sources ==
- Ćirković, Sima (2004). The Serbs. Malden: Blackwell Publishing. ISBN 9781405142915.
- Dávid, Géza; Fodor, Pál, eds. (1994). Hungarian-Ottoman Military and Diplomatic Relations in the Age of Süleyman the Magnificent. Budapest: Loránd Eötvös University, Hungarian Academy of Sciences, Institute of History. ISBN 9789638312310.
- Engel, Pál (2001). The Realm of St. Stephen: A History of Medieval Hungary, 895-1526. London & New York: I.B.Tauris. ISBN 9781850439776.
- Ивић, Алекса (1929). Историја Срба у Војводини од најстаријих времена до оснивања потиско-поморишке границе (1703). Нови Сад: Матица српска.
- Fine, John Van Antwerp Jr. (1994) [1987]. The Late Medieval Balkans: A Critical Survey from the Late Twelfth Century to the Ottoman Conquest. Ann Arbor, Michigan: University of Michigan Press. ISBN 0472082604.
- Fodor, Pál; Dávid, Géza, eds. (2000). Ottomans, Hungarians, and Habsburgs in Central Europe: The Military Confines in the Era of Ottoman Conquest. Leiden: BRILL. ISBN 9004119078.
- Jireček, Constantin (1918). Geschichte der Serben. Vol. 2. Gotha: Perthes.
- Karbić, Marija (2006). "Hrvatsko plemstvo u borbi protiv Osmanlija: Primjer obitelji Berislavića Grabarskih iz Slavonije". Povijesni prilozi. 31: 71–85.
- Krstić, Aleksandar R. (2017). "Which Realm will You Opt for? – The Serbian Nobility Between the Ottomans and the Hungarians in the 15th Century". State and Society in the Balkans Before and After Establishment of Ottoman Rule. Belgrade: Institute of History, Yunus Emre Enstitüsü Turkish Cultural Centre. pp. 129–163. ISBN 9788677431259.
- Margalits, Ede (1918). Szerb történelmi repertorium. Budapest: Magyar Tudományos Akadémia.
- Pálosfalvi, Tamás (2018). From Nicopolis to Mohács: A History of Ottoman-Hungarian Warfare, 1389-1526. Leiden: BRILL. ISBN 9789004375659.
- Rezar, Vlado, ed. (2001). Ludovici Tuberonis Dalmatae Abbatis Commentarii de temporibus suis. Zagreb: Hrvatski institut za povijest. ISBN 9789536324286.
- Thallóczy, Lajos; Áldásy, Antal, eds. (1907). Magyarország és Szerbia közti összeköttetések oklevéltára 1198-1526. Budapest: Magyar Tudományos Akadémia.
- Ћирковић, Сима (1982). "Последњи деспоти". Историја српског народа. Vol. књ. 2. Београд: Српска књижевна задруга. pp. 479–490.
