= Elena Ecaterina Rareș =

Moldavian princess consort, Serbian despina

- Јелена Бранковић
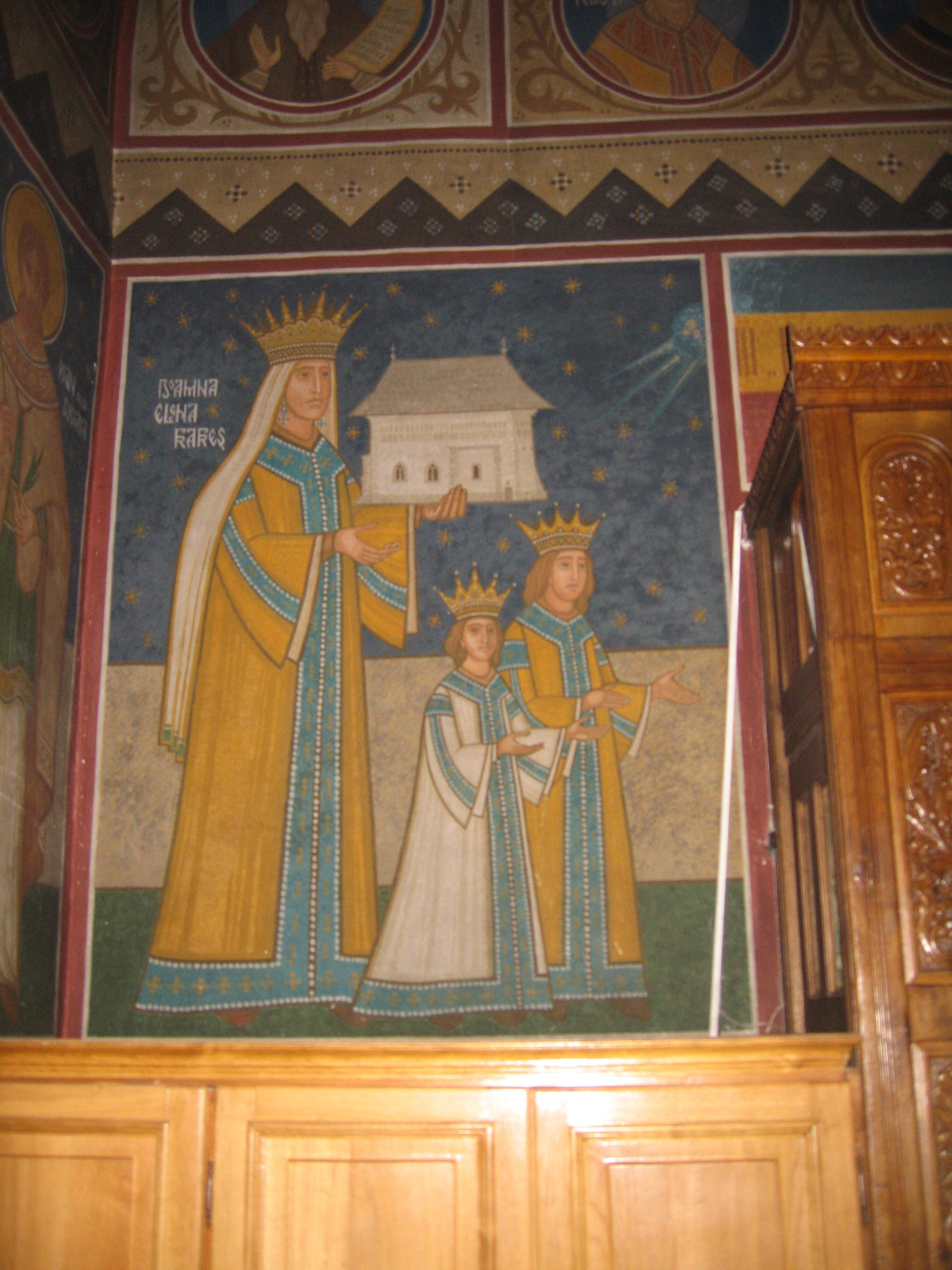
- Elena Rareş and her sons
- Died: 1553
- Spouse: Petru Rareș (m. 1530; died 1542)
- Children: Doamna Chiajna; Maria; Ilie II Rareș; Ștefan VI Rareș; Constantin; Ruxandra Lăpușneanu
- Parents: Jovan Branković (father); Jelena Jakšić (mother)

Doamna Elena Ecaterina Rareş (Serbian Cyrillic: Јелена Бранковић; died 1553) was a princess consort of Moldavia by marriage to Peter IV Rareș. She was regent in Moldavia in 1551–1553 on the behalf of her son Ştefan VI Rareş. She was the daughter of Serbian Despot Jovan Branković
