= Jovan Branković =

Titular Despot of Serbia from 1493 to 1502

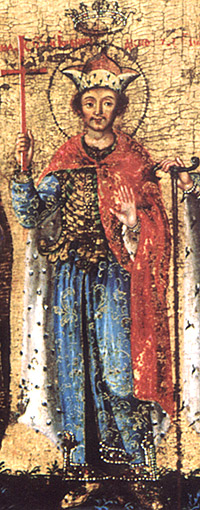
- Detail of Andreja Raičević's icon (c. 1645), depicting Jovan as a saint

Titular Despot of Serbia
- Reign: 1493–1502
- Predecessor: Đorđe Branković
- Successor: Ivaniš Berislavić
- Born: c. 1465
- Died: 10 December 1502
- Burial: Krušedol monastery
- Spouse: Jelena Jakšić
- Issue: Maria Branković; Helena Catherine, Princess of Moldavia; Anna Branković; Maria Magdalena Branković; Milica Despina, Princess of Wallachia (disputed)
- House: Branković
- Father: Stefan Branković
- Mother: Angjelina Arianiti
- Religion: Serbian Orthodox Christian

Jovan Branković (Serbian Cyrillic: Јован Бранковић, pronounced [jɔ̌v̞an brǎːnkɔv̞itɕ]; c. 1465 – 10 December 1502) was the titular Despot of Serbia from 1493 until his death in 1502. The title of despot was given to him by Hungarian king Vladislas II of Hungary. From 1493 to 1497 he held the title together with his elder brother Đorđe Branković, who was despot from 1486. In 1497, Đorđe relinquished the title, and Jovan remained the sole Despot of Serbia, until his death in 1502. Jovan was the last Serbian Despot of the Branković dynasty. With his brother he built the Krušedol monastery, and made various donations to Hilandar and other Eastern Orthodox monasteries. He was proclaimed a saint by the Serbian Orthodox Church.

== Life ==
Jovan was the younger son of Stefan Branković, exiled Despot of Serbia (1458–1459), and the Despotess Angelina of Serbia. He was born c. 1465, while his parents were residing in the Castle Belgrado, in the region of Friuli. His father, Despot Stefan, died in 1476 while family was still living in Belgrado. In 1479, Emperor Friedrich III granted them Castle Weitensfeld in Carinthia, and Jovan moved there with the rest of family.

Jovan's cousin Vuk Branković, titular Despot of Serbia, died in 1485, without direct heirs. His title and estates in the Kingdom of Hungary were left vacant, prompting Hungarian king Matthias Corvinus to find a suitable heir. He opted for the only remaining male members of Branković family (Đorđe and Jovan), inviting them to come to Hungary.

In 1486, they arrived in Hungary, and Jovan's elder brother Đorđe received the title of Despot of Serbia from King Matthias, who granted them possessions in Kupinik, Slankamen, and Berkasovo in the region of Syrmia.

From 1493 forwards, the brothers ruled jointly, since Jovan was also granted the title Despot of Serbia, as it was customary in the Kingdom of Hungary that various senior posts be held jointly by two incumbents.

In 1497, Đorđe decided to relinquish all of his titles and possessions to Jovan. At that time, Đorđe took monastic vows, adopting the name Maksim (Serbian Cyrillic: Максим). The brothers later built the Krušedol monastery in the region of Syrmia.

Jovan had different goals to those of his brother Đorđe. He did not seek to create a heavenly realm, but sought to defeat the Turks and drive them out of his lands, and as such to be entitled the ranks of his ancestors. He successfully fought the Ottoman Empire during several operations in Bosnia, especially around Zvornik. Jovan also planned to free the Serbs from Ottoman rule with the help of the Republic of Venice, but this was prevented by his death in 1502. After his death, the hope of restoring Serbia under the advancing Ottoman Empire became weaker.

He married a Serbian noblewoman Jelena Jakšić, with whom he had several children, but no surviving male heir. After his death in 1502, Hungarian king Vladislaus II (d. 1516) instructed Jovan's widow Jelena to remarry (1504) to a prominent nobleman, Ivaniš Berislavić (d. 1514) from Požega County. Subsequently, Berislavić was granted the title Despot of Serbia and control over Branković family estates.

Jovan is mentioned in the "Dell'Imperadori Constantinopolitani", or Massarelli manuscript, found in the papers of Angelo Massarelli (1510–1566).

== Sainthood ==
Saint Jovan Branković Свети Јован Бранковић

Saint
- Born: c. 1465
- Died: 10 December 1502; Krušedol Monastery, modern Serbia
- Venerated in: Eastern Orthodox Church
- Canonized: 16th century, in Syrmia by the Serbian Orthodox Church
- Major shrine: Krušedol Monastery
- Feast: December 10 O.S. December 23 N.S.

Members of the Branković dynasty were known for their devotion to Eastern Orthodox Christianity, and Jovan Branković also represented that family tradition. His cult began in the first half of the 16th century. He was buried at the Krušedol monastery, and laid together with the rest of his family members, in coffins at the altar. During the Austro-Turkish War (1716–1718), a Turkish army invaded Syrmia in 1716, captured Krušedol monastery and burned the holy relics, shortly after the Battle of Petrovaradin. Only some minor parts of the relics were preserved.

== Family ==
He married Serbian noblewoman Jelena Jakšić, member of the influential House of Jakšić, who is mentioned as "Helena, Serbiæ despotissa" in a charter dated to 1502. They had 4 children, all of whom were daughters:

- Marija, married to Ferdinand Frankopan, of the House of Frankopan
- Jelena, married to Peter IV Rareş, Prince of Moldavia, member of the House of Bogdan-Mușat
- Ana, married to Fiodor Sanguszko, Marshal of Volhynia
- Marija Magdalena, married to Iwan Wiśniowiecki, a noble from Volhynia

Some researchers have suggested, after taking into account the dates of Jelena's both marriages (first with Jovan Branković, and second with Ivaniš Berislavić), that some of her daughters who are usually considered to be from her first marriage, might in fact be from her second marriage.

Some genealogies also indicate that another daughter, Milica Despina, married Neagoe Basarab, Prince of Wallachia (1512–21). Some believe Milica was too old to be his daughter, but she was born cca. 1486–1488. Milica Despina might have been an illegitimate daughter of his or other close relative or even the daughter of Jovan's brother Đorđe with whom she went to Wallachia in 1503.

Ancestors of Jovan Branković

16. Branko Mladenović
8. Vuk Branković
4. Đurađ I Branković
18. Lazar I Hrebeljanović
9. Maria Lazarević
19. Milica Nemanjić
2. Stefan Branković
20. Demetrios I Kantakouzenos
10. Theodore Palaiologos Kantakouzenos
5. Eirene Kantakouzene
11. Euphrosyne Palaiologina
1. Jovan Branković
12. Komnen Arianiti
6. Gjergj Arianiti
26. Nikollë Zaharia
13. Nikollë Zaharia's daughter
3. Angjelina Arianiti
28. Gjin I Muzaka
14. Andrea III Muzaka
29. Zanfina Arianiti
7. Maria Muzaka
30. Gjon Zenebishi
15. Chiranna Zenebishi
31. Irene Bua Shpata

== Sources ==
- Andrić, Stanko (2016). "Saint John Capistran and Despot George Branković: An Impossible Compromise". Byzantinoslavica. 74 (1–2): 202–227.
- Bataković, Dušan T., ed. (2005). Histoire du peuple serbe [History of the Serbian People] (in French). Lausanne: L'Age d'Homme. ISBN 9782825119587.
- Ćirković, Sima (2004). The Serbs. Malden: Blackwell Publishing. ISBN 9781405142915.
- Fotić, Aleksandar (2008a). "Branković family". Encyclopedia of the Ottoman Empire. New York: Infobase Publishing. pp. 93–94.
- Isailović, Neven G.; Krstić, Aleksandar R. (2015). "Serbian Language and Cyrillic Script as a Means of Diplomatic Literacy in South Eastern Europe in 15th and 16th Centuries". Literacy Experiences concerning Medieval and Early Modern Transylvania. Cluj-Napoca: George Bariţiu Institute of History. pp. 185–195.
- Ivić, Pavle, ed. (1995). The History of Serbian Culture. Edgware: Porthill Publishers. ISBN 9781870732314.
- Jireček, Constantin (1918). Geschichte der Serben. Vol. 2. Gotha: Perthes.
- Krstić, Aleksandar R. (2017). "Which Realm will You Opt for? – The Serbian Nobility Between the Ottomans and the Hungarians in the 15th Century". State and Society in the Balkans Before and After Establishment of Ottoman Rule. Belgrade: Institute of History, Yunus Emre Enstitüsü Turkish Cultural Centre. pp. 129–163. ISBN 9788677431259.
- Paizi-Apostolopoulou, Machi (2012). "Appealing to the Authority of a Learned Patriarch: New Evidence on Gennadios Scholarios' Responses to the Questions of George Branković". The Historical Review. 9: 95–116.
- Pilat, Liviu (2010). "Mitropolitul Maxim Brancovici, Bogdan al III-lea şi legăturile Moldovei cu Biserica sârbă". Analele Putnei (in Romanian). 6 (1): 229–238.
- Samardžić, Radovan; Duškov, Milan, eds. (1993). Serbs in European Civilization. Belgrade: Nova, Serbian Academy of Sciences and Arts, Institute for Balkan Studies. ISBN 9788675830153.
- Spremić, Momčilo (2004). "La famille serbe des Branković – considérations généalogiques et héraldiques" (PDF). Зборник радова Византолошког института (in French). 41: 441–452.
- Stojkovski, Boris; Ivanić, Ivana; Spăriosu, Laura (2018). "Serbian-Romanian Relations in the Middle Ages until the Ottoman Conquest" (PDF). Transylvanian Review. 27 (2): 217–229. Archived from the original (PDF) on 2022-01-21.
- Wasilewski, Tadeusz (1963). "Przyczynki źródłowe do stosunków Polski ze Słowiańszczyzną południową w wiekach XIII-XVI" (PDF). Studia Źródłoznawcze. 8: 117–124.
- Zabolotnaia, Lilia (2010). "Câteva precizări despre dinastia Branković". Tyragetia. 4 (2): 115–122.

Regnal titles
Preceded by Đorđe Branković	titular Despot of Serbia; 1493–1502	Succeeded by Ivaniš Berislavić
