= Đorđe Branković =

Saint Đorđe Branković Ђорђе Бранковић
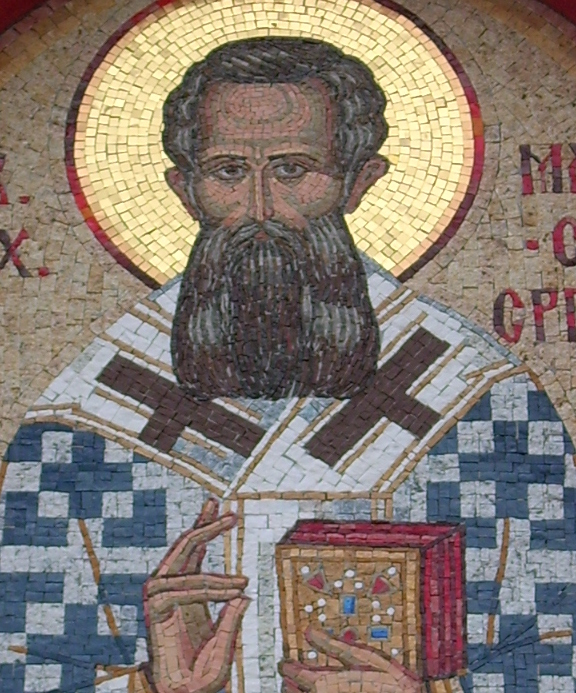
- Stone-icon on the outer wall of the Krušedol monastery

Titular Despot of Serbia
- Reign: 1486–1497
- Predecessor: Vuk Branković
- Successor: Jovan Branković
- Born: 1461; Shkodër, Albania
- Died: 18 January 1516 (aged 54–55); Kingdom of Hungary
- Burial: Krušedol monastery
- Spouse: Isabella del Balzo
- House: Branković
- Father: Stefan Branković
- Mother: Angjelina Arianiti
- Religion: Serbian Orthodox Christian

Đorđe Branković (Serbian Cyrillic: Ђорђе Бранковић; anglicized as George; also known as Saint Maksim; 1461–1516) was the last male member of the Branković dynasty, and titular Despot of Serbia from 1486 to 1497. The title was granted to him by Hungarian king Matthias Corvinus. From 1493, he shared the title with his brother Jovan. In 1497, Đorđe relinquished all titles and possessions to his brother, and decided to take monastic vows, adopting the name Maksim (Serbian Cyrillic: Максим). He built the Krušedol monastery, and served as diplomatic envoy for prince Radu IV the Great of Wallachia (1507). In 1513, he became Metropolitan of Belgrade. After his death (1516), he was venerated as saint, and canonized by the Serbian Orthodox Church.

== Life ==
Đorđe was the son of Stefan Branković, exiled Despot of Serbia (1458–1459), and the Albanian Princess Angjelina Arianiti, daughter of Gjergj Arianiti. He was born in 1461, while his parents were residing in the region of Shkoder. The family later moved to northern Italy and acquired Castle Belgrado in the region of Friuli. His father, Despot Stefan, died in 1476, and young Đorđe became his principal heir. In 1479, emperor Friedrich III granted them Castle Weitensfeld in Carinthia, and Đorđe moved there with the rest of family.

Đorđe′s first cousin Vuk Branković, titular Despot of Serbia, died on April 16, 1485, without direct heirs. His title and vast estates in the Kingdom of Hungary were left vacant, prompting Hungarian king Matthias Corvinus to find a suitable heir. He opted for the only remaining male members of Branković family (Đorđe and his brother Jovan), inviting them to come to Hungary.

In 1486, Đorđe arrived in Hungary and received the title of Despot of Serbia from King Matthias, who granted him cities of Kupinik, Slankamen, and Berkasovo in Syrmia, as well as other towns which fell under these cities.

In 1487, Đorđe was married to Isabella del Balzo (d. 1498), the daughter of Angilberto del Balzo, Duke of Nardò in the Kingdom of Naples and his wife, Maria Conquista Orsini, Countess of Castro & Ugento, Duchess of Taurisano. Isabella was a cousin of Queen Beatrice, wife of King Matthias of Hungary.

From 1493 forwards, Đorđe ruled jointly with his brother Jovan, who was also granted the title Despot of Serbia, as it was customary in the Kingdom of Hungary that various senior posts should be held jointly by two incumbents. In 1494, the two brothers fought against Lawrence of Ilok, who had possessions in Syrmia and Slavonia. In December 1494, the brothers conquered Mitrovica, which they entrusted to their nobles.

In 1497, despot Đorđe decided to relinquish all of his titles and possessions to his brother. He took monastic vows, adopting the name Maksim (Serbian Cyrillic: Максим). He built the Krušedol monastery in the region of Syrmia.

His brother, despot Jovan, died in 1502 without a male heir, and King Vladislaus II of Hungary arranged a new marriage for Jovan′s widow Jelena Jakšić, who remarried to a fellow Serbian nobleman, Ivaniš Berislavić in 1504. Berislavić was granted the title of Serbian Despot, as well as control over the possessions of Jelena.

Soon after that, Maksim left Hungary and went to the Principality of Wallachia, where he was welcomed by Prince Radu IV the Great (1495-1508), who entrusted Maksim with important diplomatic missions. In 1507, Maxim successfully mediated peace between Prince Radu of Walachia and Prince Bogdan III (1504-1517) of Moldavia.

At the time of his stay in Wallachia, the Metropolitanate of Wallachia was undergoing the process of continuous institutional development. Maksim′s name was enlisted in a diptych of local Hierarchs, and some historians suggested that he became bishop in one of Wallachian eparchies, or even Metropolitan of Wallachia, but other researchers have pointed out that there is no direct confirmation for such assumption.

Upon his return to Hungary, he served as Metropolitan of Belgrade (from 1513). After his death in 1516, he was venerated as saint, and canonized by the Serbian Orthodox Church.

He is mentioned, together with all of his family, in the "Dell'Imperadori Constantinopolitani", or Massarelli manuscript, found in the papers of Angelo Massarelli (1510–1566).

== Sainthood ==
Saint Maksim Branković Свети Максим Бранковић
- Born: 1461
- Died: 1516; Krušedol Monastery, modern Serbia
- Venerated in: Eastern Orthodox Church
- Canonized: 16th century, Syrmia by the Serbian Orthodox Church
- Major shrine: Krušedol Monastery
- Feast: 18 January O.S. 31 January N.S.

Members of the Branković dynasty were known for their devotion to Eastern Orthodox Christianity, and Đorđe Branković (metropolitan Maksim) also represented that family tradition. He died on 18 January 1516, and early indications of sainthood aperared by 1523, in the time when Belgrade was already in Ottoman hands (since 1521). By that time, the Ottoman expansion has reached the Krušedol Monastery, where he was buried there. During those troubled times, his cult was founded in order to serve as a morale booster for the Serbs, who fought, together with the Hungarians and other Christians, against the invading Ottomans. At the same time, in the same place, and with the same idea, cults of all his family members were founded: his father's, Stefan Branković (d 1476), his mother's, Angjelina (at the same time as Maksim), and his brother's, Jovan (d. 1502). During the 16th century, monks of Krušedol monastery celebrated those members of the Branković dynasty, and hagiographies were written of Angelina and Maksim.

The family members were buried at the Krušedol monastery and laid together in coffins at the altar. During the Austro-Turkish War (1716-1718), a Turkish army invaded Syrmia in 1716, captured Krušedol and burned the holy relics, shortly after the Battle of Petrovaradin. Only some minor parts of the relics were preserved.

== Ancestry ==
Ancestors of Đorđe Branković

16. Branko Mladenović
8. Vuk Branković
4. Đurađ I Branković
18. Lazar I Hrebeljanović
9. Mara Lazarević
19. Milica Nemanjić
2. Stefan Branković
20. Demetrios I Kantakouzenos
10. Theodore Palaiologos Kantakouzenos
5. Irene Kantakouzene
22. Jovan Uroš Nemanjić
11. Helena Ouresina Doukaina Nemanjić
23. daughter of Radoslav Hlapen
1. Đorđe Branković
12. Komnen Arianiti
6. Gjergj Arianiti
26. Nikollë Zaharia
13. Nikollë Zaharia's daughter
3. Angjelina Arianiti
28. Gjin I Muzaka
14. Andrea III Muzaka
29. Zanfina Arianiti
7. Maria Muzaka
30. Gjon Zenebishi
15. Chiranna Zenebishi
31. Irene Bua Shpata

== Gallery ==
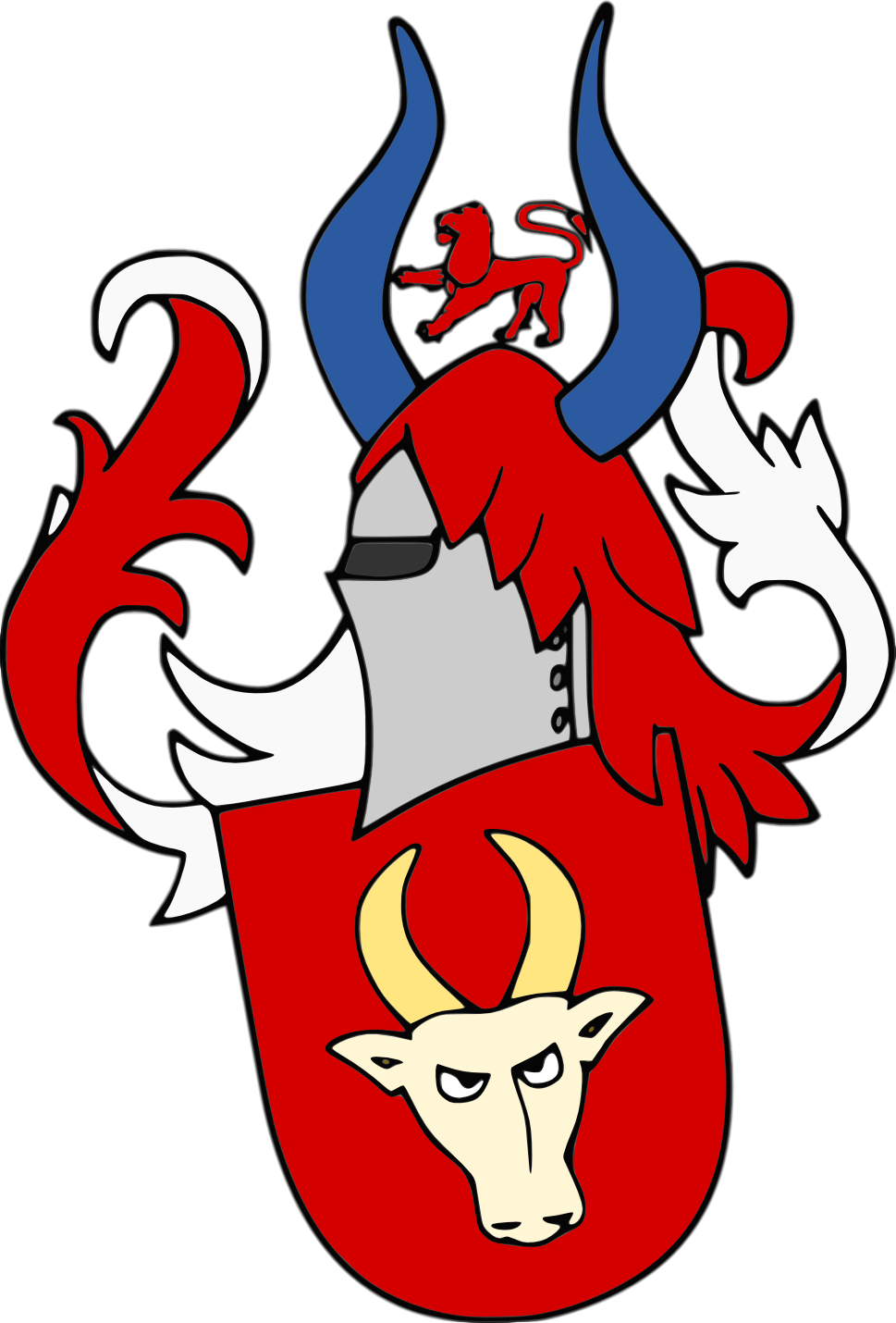
Personal coat of arms

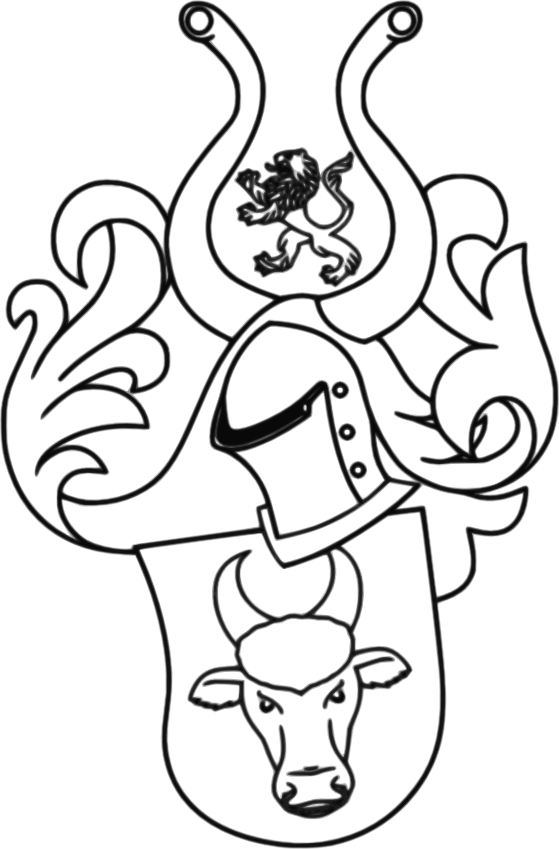

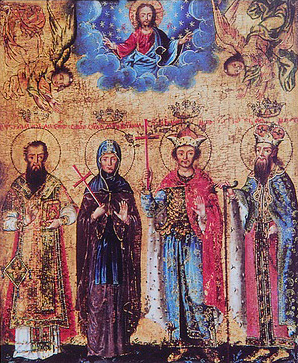
Saints Maksim, Angelina, Jovan and Stefan Branković, by Andreja Raičević (c. 1645)

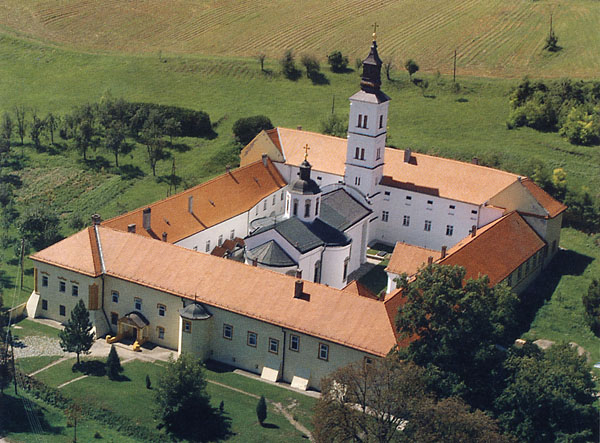
Krušedol monastery was founded by Đorđe Branković

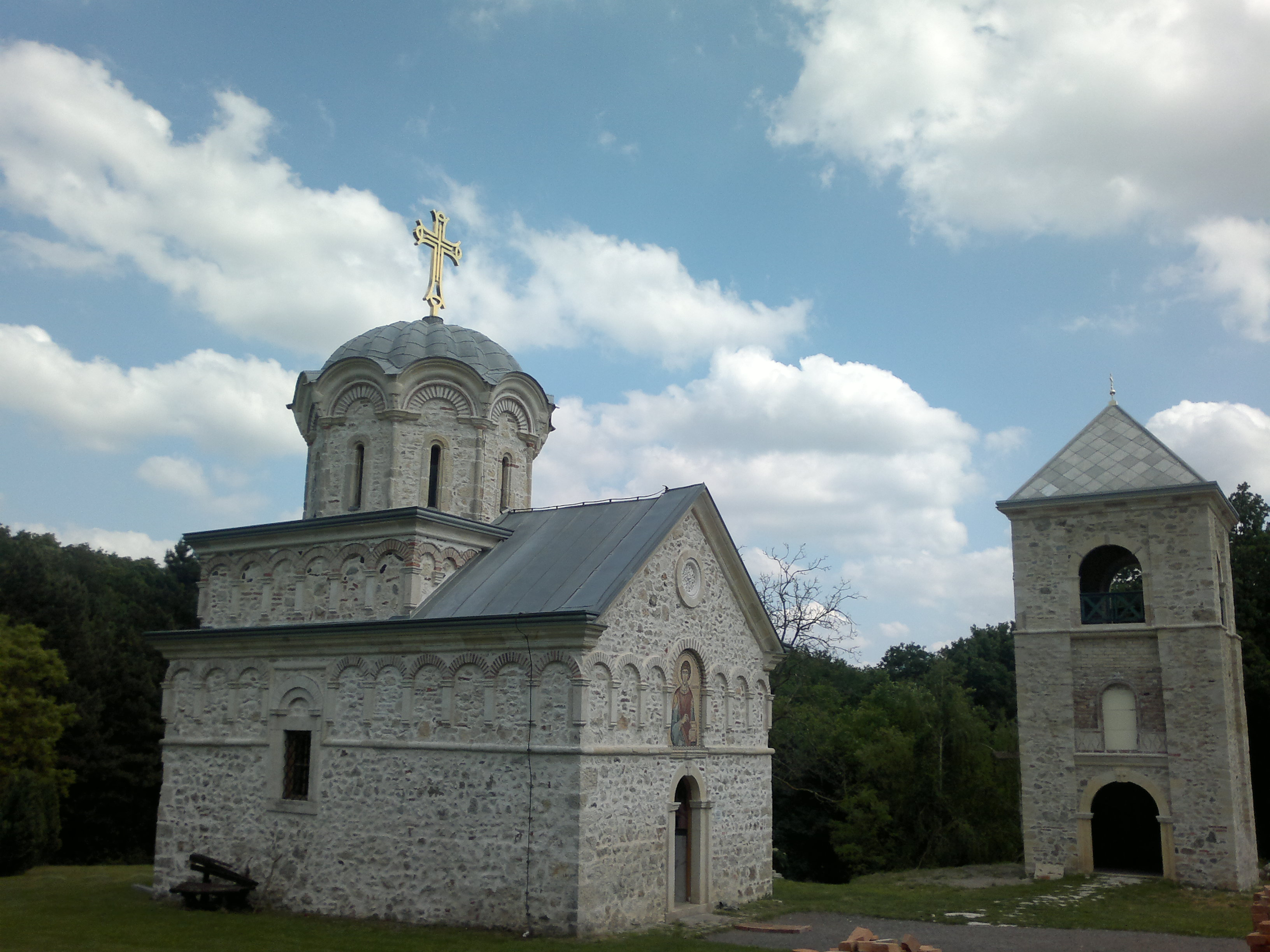
Staro Hopovo monastery was founded by Đorđe Branković

== Sources ==
- Andrić, Stanko (2016). "Saint John Capistran and Despot George Branković: An Impossible Compromise". Byzantinoslavica. 74 (1–2): 202–227.
- Bataković, Dušan T., ed. (2005). Histoire du peuple serbe [History of the Serbian People] (in French). Lausanne: L’Age d’Homme.
- Božanić, Snežana (2015). "The Political and Cultural Life of Despot Đorđe Branković in Syrmia". The Cultural and Historical Heritage of Vojvodina in the Context of Classical and Medieval Studies. Novi Sad: Faculty of Philosophy. pp. 191–203.
- Ćirković, Sima (2004). The Serbs. Malden: Blackwell Publishing.
- Fotić, Aleksandar (2008a). "Branković family". Encyclopedia of the Ottoman Empire. New York: Infobase Publishing. pp. 93–94.
- Gavrilović, Slavko (1993). "Serbs in Hungary, Slavonia and Croatia in struggles against the Turks (15th-18th centuries)". Serbs in European Civilization. Belgrade: Nova, Serbian Academy of Sciences and Arts, Institute for Balkan Studies. pp. 41–54.
- Isailović, Neven G.; Krstić, Aleksandar R. (2015). "Serbian Language and Cyrillic Script as a Means of Diplomatic Literacy in South Eastern Europe in 15th and 16th Centuries". Literacy Experiences concerning Medieval and Early Modern Transylvania. Cluj-Napoca: George Bariţiu Institute of History. pp. 185–195.
- Ivić, Pavle, ed. (1995). The History of Serbian Culture. Edgware: Porthill Publishers.
- Jireček, Constantin (1918). Geschichte der Serben. Vol. 2. Gotha: Perthes.
- Krstić, Aleksandar R. (2017). "Which Realm will You Opt for? – The Serbian Nobility Between the Ottomans and the Hungarians in the 15th Century". State and Society in the Balkans Before and After Establishment of Ottoman Rule. Belgrade: Institute of History, Yunus Emre Enstitüsü Turkish Cultural Centre. pp. 129–163.
- Paizi-Apostolopoulou, Machi (2012). "Appealing to the Authority of a Learned Patriarch: New Evidence on Gennadios Scholarios' Responses to the Questions of George Branković". The Historical Review. 9: 95–116.
- Pilat, Liviu (2010). "Mitropolitul Maxim Brancovici, Bogdan al III-lea şi legăturile Moldovei cu Biserica sârbă". Analele Putnei (in Romanian). 6 (1): 229–238.
- Spremić, Momčilo (2004). "La famille serbe des Branković - considérations généalogiques et héraldiques" (PDF). Зборник радова Византолошког института (in French). 41: 441–452.
- Stojkovski, Boris; Ivanić, Ivana; Spăriosu, Laura (2018). "Serbian-Romanian Relations in the Middle Ages until the Ottoman Conquest" (PDF). Transylvanian Review. 27 (2): 217–229.

Regnal titles
Preceded by Vuk Branković	titular Despot of Serbia; 1486–1497	Succeeded by Jovan Branković
