= Ivaniš Berislavić =

Ivaniš Ivaniš Berislavić Ivan Berislavić
- Serbian Despot

Despot of Serbia
- Reign: 1504–1514
- Predecessor: Jovan Branković
- Successor: Stjepan Berislavić
- Spouse: Jelena Jakšić
Names
- Ivaniš Berislavić
- House: Berislavići Grabarski
- Religion: Catholic

Ivaniš Berislavić (Serbian Cyrillic: Иваниш Бериславић; Latin: Joannes Berizlo) was the Despot of the Kingdom of Serbia (regni Rascie despotus) from 1504 to 1514. He was married to Jelena Jakšić who was the daughter of Stefan Jakšić (d. 1489), member of the powerful House of Jakšić.

== Background ==
Ivaniš Berislavić was a member of the House of Berislavić, a Croatian noble family from Slavonia, subordinate to the Kingdom of Hungary.

== Life ==
After the death of despot Jovan Branković (1502), Vladislaus II of Hungary made Ivaniš Berislavić the interim despot of Serbia. With no male successor to the Branković dynasty, the position was given to the Berislavić family which had already been intertwined with the Branković dynasty with the marriage of Ivan's cousin Franjo Berislavić (d. 1517) and Barbara Frankopan (d. 1508), who had been the widow of Vuk Branković II. In addition, their estates shared borders, and despot Đorđe Branković, as well as Jovan, had been supporters of Mathias Corvinus like the Berislavićs.

Nevertheless, the decision was apparently not welcomed in Serbia, where the local chroniclers would not mention Ivaniš Berislavić by name, likely because they had expected the privilege to pass to the Serbian House of Jakšić, who were also in the service of the Hungarian king.

The official act of making Ivaniš the despot was confirmed by January 1504 in Buda, when his marriage with Jovan's widow Jelena (née Jakšić) was arranged, and he received the title of despot of Serbia. The marriage itself was postponed until May 1504 because of Jelena's illness.

Ivaniš was made protector of the Eastern Orthodox Church in Hungary, and in charters he signed as "In God's Grace, the Despot of Serbia".

The defence of the southern border of the Kingdom of Hungary was handled by Berislavić as despot, with the support of Stevan, Marko and Petar Jakšić, Stjepan Bradač, and the armed forces of Belgrade and Šabac.

His son, Stefan, had the title of "Serbian Despot" until his defeat in battle against the Ottomans in 1535.

Berislavić received the former appanage of Jovan, which the Hungarians had confiscated upon his death. His residence was at Kupinik, in Srem.

Berislavić was also named the "Ban of Jajce" in 1511, replacing Baltazar Alapić.

He took an oath to secure the southern borders of Hungary and to be loyal to his people. He also had a seat at Brod on the Sava, from where he watched his cities in Srem and Slavonia, including Banovina of Jajce.

Because his duties involved a significant effort as well as financial cost, he repeatedly asked the Hungarian King to remove him from service as Ban of Jajce in 1513, and the King complied on 25 May. This was the last mention of him alive, and he is assumed to have died in 1514, because his wife despot Jelena is mentioned as the Lord of the Despot's military forces.

Regnal titles
Vacant Title last held by Jovan Branković	Despot of the Kingdom of Serbia; 1504–1514	Succeeded by Stefan Berislavić
