= Berislavić family of Vrh Rike =

The Berislavić family of Vrh Rike (Croatian: Berislavići Vrhrički, also known as Berislavići Malomlački), was a Croatian noble family, and a cadet branch of the Croatian noble tribe/family of Čubranić seated in Vrh Rike (and Livno).

== Notable members ==
- Stjepan I (born around 1380)
  - Vuk (cca. 1410-1448), noble judge
  - Pavao (b. cca. 1420), noble judge
- Stjepan II (cca. 1450-1509), moved to Slavonia, where he acquired many estates in the Zagreb County and Varaždin County (including Mala Mlaka after which his descendants were named Malomlački)
  - Stjepan III (cca. 1562-1609), sub-Ban of Croatia (1591-1596)
    - Stjepan IV (cca. 1598-1641/42), sub-Ban of Croatia (1640)
      - Franjo Aleksandar (cca. 1631-1678), cavalry captain of Petar Zrinski

== See also ==
- Berislavić family of Trogir
- Berislavić family of Grabarje
