= Berislavić family of Trogir =

Croatian noble family whose origin is uncertain

The Berislavić family of Trogir (Croatian: Berislavići Trogirski) was a Croatian noble family whose origin is uncertain, possibly a kin to the Berislavić family of Vrh Rike rather than Berislavić family of Grabarje.

- Petar Berislavić (1475–1520), son of Ivan, was Ban of Croatia (1513-1520) and bishop of Veszprém.

== See also ==
- Berislavić family of Vrh Rike
- Berislavić family of Grabarje
