= Berislavić family of Grabarje =

The Berislavić family of Grabarje (Croatian: Berislavići Grabarski, Serbian: Бериславићи Грабарски) also known as Berislavić family of Dobor (Croatian: Berislavići Doborski, Serbian: Бериславићи Доборски), was a Croatian noble family from the Požega County of Slavonia.

== History ==
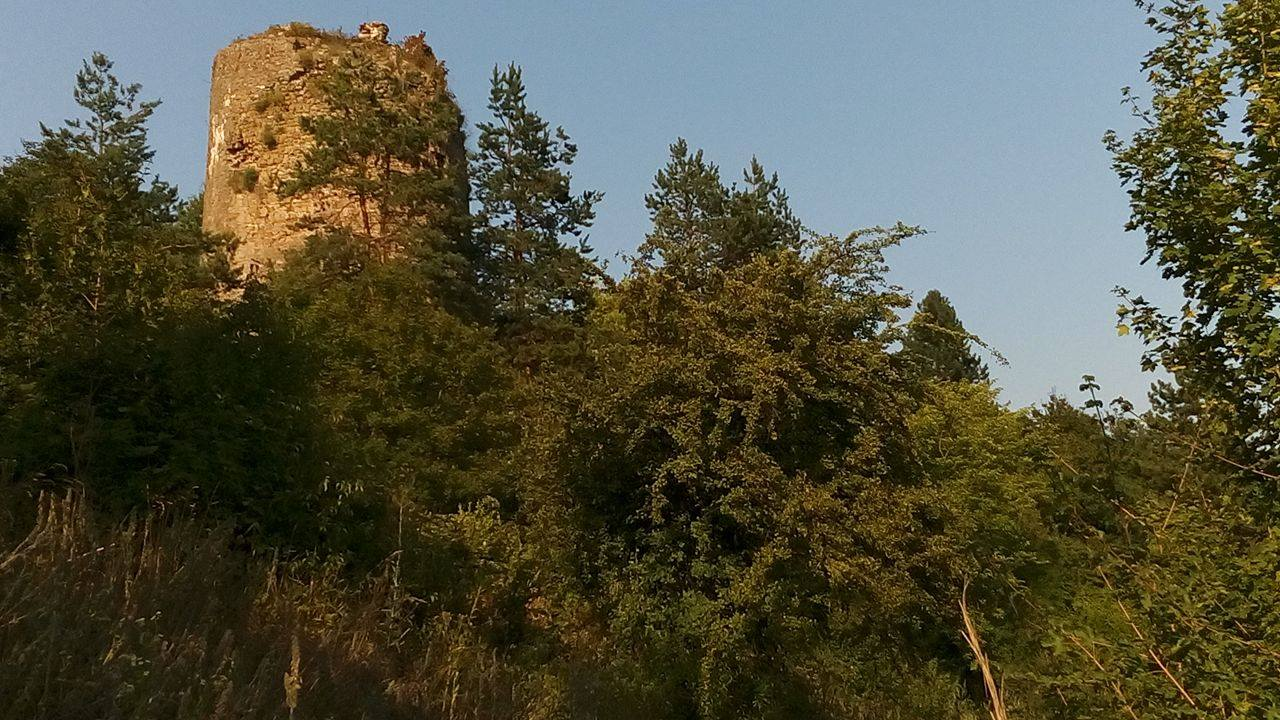
Ruins of Dobor fortress in Usora, owned by Berislavić family from 1463 until 1536

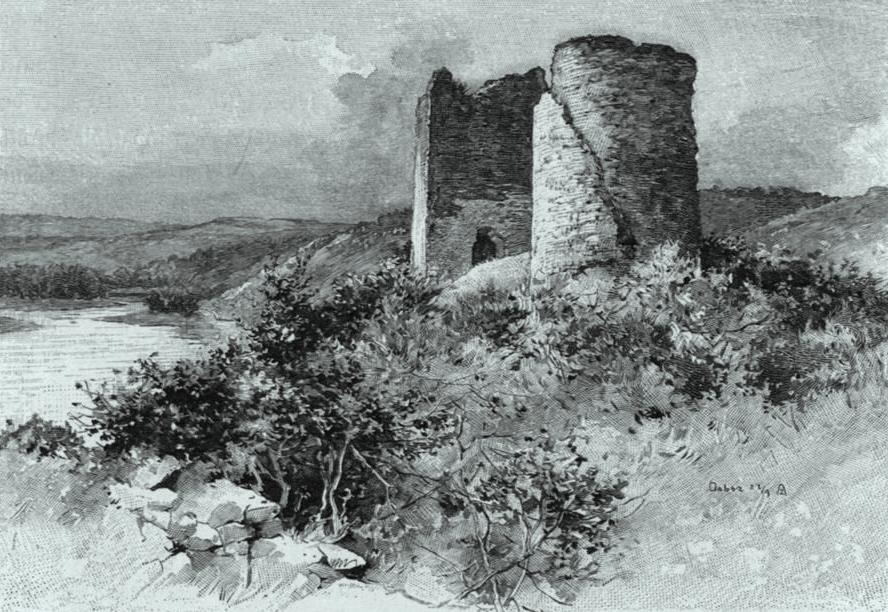
Ruins of strategic Dobor fortress near Modriča, besieged by Sigismund nine times from 1394 to 1410, destroyed finally by Austria in 1716

According to the family tradition Ban Borić of Bosnia, ruled from 1154 until c.1167, was an ancestor of the family. The family is first mentioned in 13th century, and continuously can be traced since the beginning of the 15th century. They are named after their estate of Grabarje near Podvinje and Garčin, with initial other estates in Požega County and Vukovar-Srijem County.

The family was most prominent during the second half of the 15th and the first half of the 16th century. Members of the family served as Bans of Jajce, and titular Despots of Serbia.

== Notable members ==
- Franjo Berislavić (died in 1517), son of Ivan and grandson of Benedikt (died 1464), Ban of Jajce between 1494 and 1495, and from 1499 until 1503.
- Ivaniš Berislavić (died in 1514), son of Martin and grandson of Benedikt, titular Despot of Serbia (1503-1514), and Ban of Jajce from 1511 until 1513.
- Bartol Berislavić (died 1522), son of Petar and grandson of Martin of Benedikt, was prior of the Priory of Vrana (since 1475) and Ban of Jajce (1507).
- Stjepan Berislavić (died in 1535), son of Ivaniš, titular Despot of Serbia, from 1520 until his death in 1535.

== See also ==
- Berislavić family of Trogir
- Berislavić family of Vrh Rike

== Sources ==
- C. Tóth, Norbert; Horváth, Richárd; Neumann, Tibor; Pálosfalvi, Tamás (2016). Magyarország világi archontológiája, 1458-1526, I: Főpapok és bárók [Secular Archontology of Hungary, 1301–1457, Volume I: Prelates and Barons]. MTA Bölcsészettudományi Kutatóközpont, Történettudományi Intézet. ISBN 978-963-416-035-9.
