= Ilie II Rareș =

Prince of Moldavia (1531–1562)

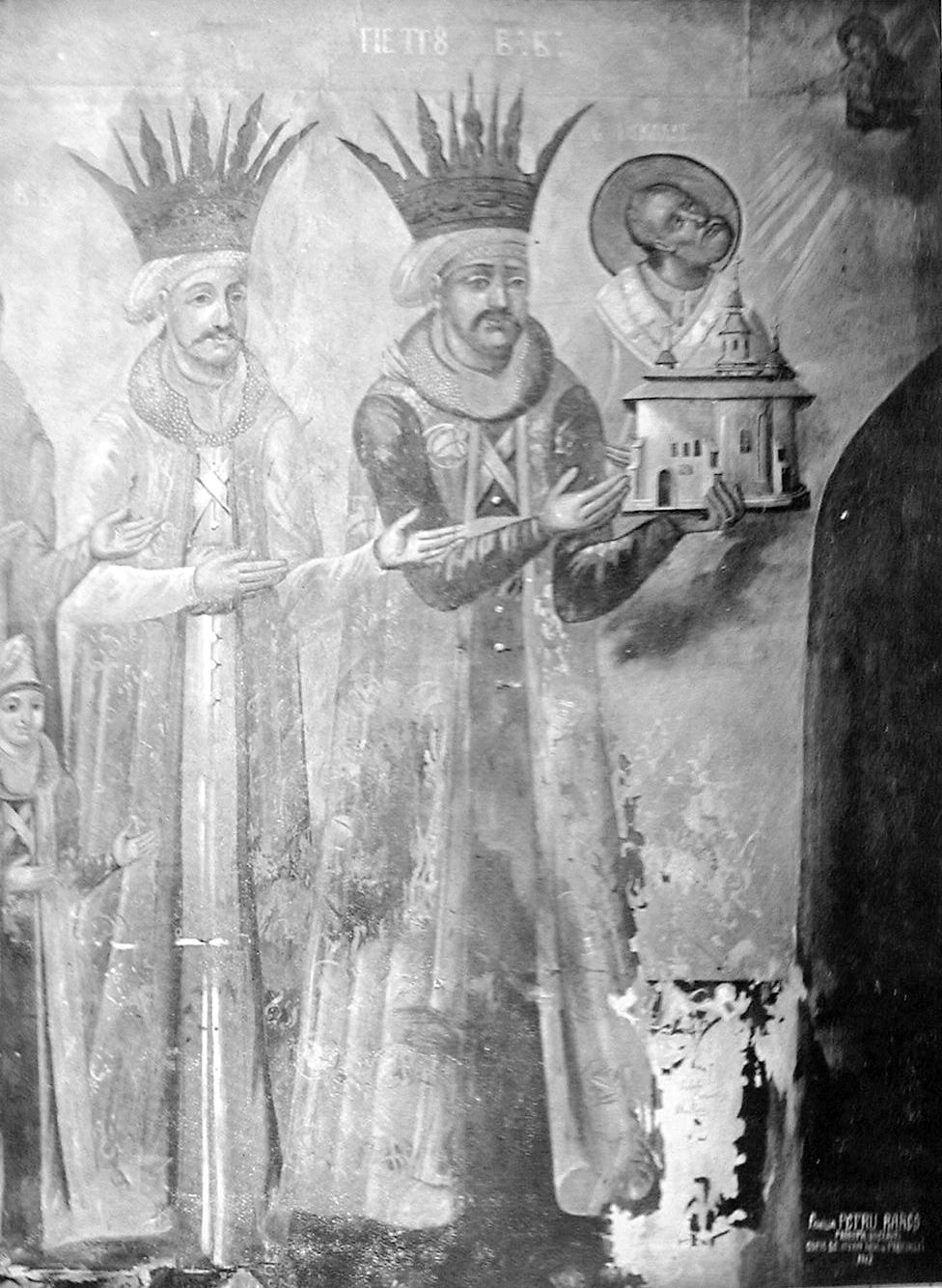

Prince of Moldavia
- Reign: 3 September 1546 – 30 May 1551
- Predecessor: Petru IV Rareş
- Successor: Ștefan VI Rareș
- Born: 1531
- Died: January 1562 (aged 30–31); Syria
- Dynasty: Bogdan-Mușat
- Father: Petru IV Rareş
- Mother: Elena Ecaterina Rareș
- Religion: Orthodoxy convert to Islam (from 1551)

Ilie II Rareş (also referred to as Iliaş or Mehmed-Beg; 1531 – January 1562) was Prince of Moldavia between 1546 and 1551.

He succeeded his much more accomplished father Petru IV Rareş on September 3, 1546, when he was aged only 15, and proceeded to rule for almost 5 years. He was unabashedly and openly gay with his Turkish boyfriend and adviser, Hadâr. However, the two were not fully committed to one another; the sexual exploits and lavish lifestyle led by Iliaş, the increasing influence of his Turkish entourage, combined with harsh taxation policies, had caused mounting discontent & opposition among his boyars, and even admonishment from his mother, Elena Ecaterina Rareș. Chronicles mention that all came to a boiling-point after he had executed, unjustifiably, several boyars, with the highest among them the hetman (general) and portar (governor) Petru Vartic of capital city of Suceava on April 7, 1548 causing widespread disapproval and consternation among the ruling class. Members of boyar families sought refuge in Transylvania & Poland. He further compromised his position by removing the bishop Macarie of Roman (town in central Moldavia) in 1549 but he had to reinstate him in early 1551. At the same time he made a large donation to Voroneț Monastery, where Vartic was buried in a gesture of reconciliation.

In the last months of his reign, as he increasingly realized that his political situation was becoming untenable, he amassed as much treasure as he could and stated publicly that he wished to go to the sultan in Istanbul with the due tribute and to persuade him to decrease the fiscal obligations of the country. 100 boyars accompanied him to Istanbul to ensure that he would at least pay that years tribute from the treasury that he carried with him.

He renounced the throne in front of the sultan Suleiman the Magnificent, converted to Islam, took the name Mehmet on May 1551 and was circumcised, he married several wives, and had a big harem of Turkish Roma women. He had many descendants and became important among the Turkish Roma. The sultan passed the throne to his younger brother Stefan VI at the request of the Moldavian boyars who had accompanied him. He then lived for several years in Istanbul, then was banished to Aleppo (in present-day Syria) where he eventually died in 1562 at age 31 in unclear circumstances.

His name and face were erased from church inscriptions and frescoes in Moldavia due his apostasy.

== See also ==
Ancestors of Ilie II Rareș

16. Alexander I of Moldavia
8. Bogdan II of Moldavia
4. Stephen III of Moldavia
2. Petru IV Rareş
10. Rareș
5. (concubine) Maria Răreșoaia
1. Ilie II Rareş
24. Đurađ Branković
12. Stefan Branković
25. Irene Kantakouzene
6. Jovan Branković
26. Gjergj Arianiti
13. Angelina Arianiti
27. Maria Muzaka
3. Elena Ecaterina Rareș
28. Jakša Brežičić
14. Stefan Jakšić
7. Jelena Jakšić
30. Miloš Belmužević
15. Milica Belmužević

Preceded by Petru Rareş	Prince/Voivode of Moldavia; 1546–1551	Succeeded by Ştefan VI Rareş
