= Ruxandra Lăpușneanu =

Ruxandra of Moldavia
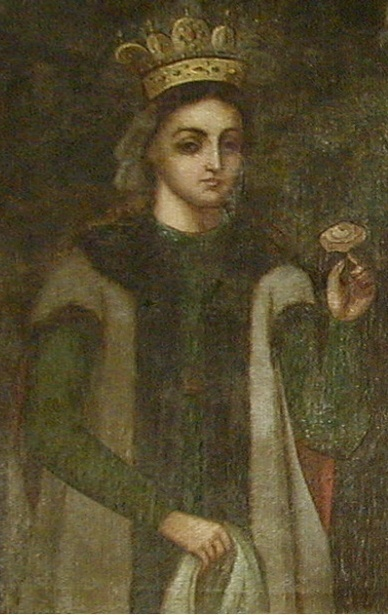

Regent of Moldavia
- Regency: 1568–1570
- Prince: Bogdan IV of Moldavia

Princess Consort of Moldavia (1st reign)
- Tenure: 1556–1561

Princess Consort of Moldavia (2nd reign)
- Tenure: 1564–1568
- Born: 1538; Suceava, Principality of Moldavia
- Died: 21 November 1570 (aged 31–32); Iași, Principality of Moldavia
- Spouse: Alexandru Lăpușneanu
- Issue: Bogdan IV of Moldavia
- House: House of Mușat
- Father: Petru Rareș of Moldavia
- Mother: Doamna Jelena Branković of Serbia

Ruxandra Lăpușneanu (1538 – 21 November 1570) was a princess consort of Moldavia by her marriage to Alexandru Lăpușneanu in 1564. Ruxandra was the daughter of Peter IV Rareș and Princess Elena Ecaterina Rareș (the second daughter of Jovan Branković of Serbia). From 1568 until 1570 she was regent in Moldavia on behalf of her son Bogdan IV of Moldavia.

== Ancestry ==
Ancestors of Ruxandra Lăpușneanu

16. Alexander I of Moldavia
8. Bogdan II of Moldavia
4. Stephen III of Moldavia
2. Petru IV Rareş
10. Rareș
5. (concubine) Maria Răreșoaia
1. Ruxandra
24. Đurađ Branković
12. Stefan Branković
25. Irene Kantakouzene
6. Jovan Branković
26. Gjergj Arianiti
13. Angelina Arianiti of Albania
27. Maria Muzaka
3. Jelena Branković
28. Jakša
14. Stefan Jakšić
7. Jelena Jakšić
