= Stephen of Moldavia =

Stephen of Moldavia may refer to:

- Stephen I of Moldavia (1394–1399)
- Stephen II of Moldavia (1434–1435, 1436–1447)
- Stephen III of Moldavia (1457–1504), also known as Stephen the Great (Ştefan Cel Mare)
- Stephen IV of Moldavia (1517–1527)
- Stephen Locust (1538–1540)
- Ştefan VI Rareş (1551–1552)
- Ştefan Tomşa (1563–1564)
