= Ștefan VI Rareș =

Prince of Moldavia (1531–1552)

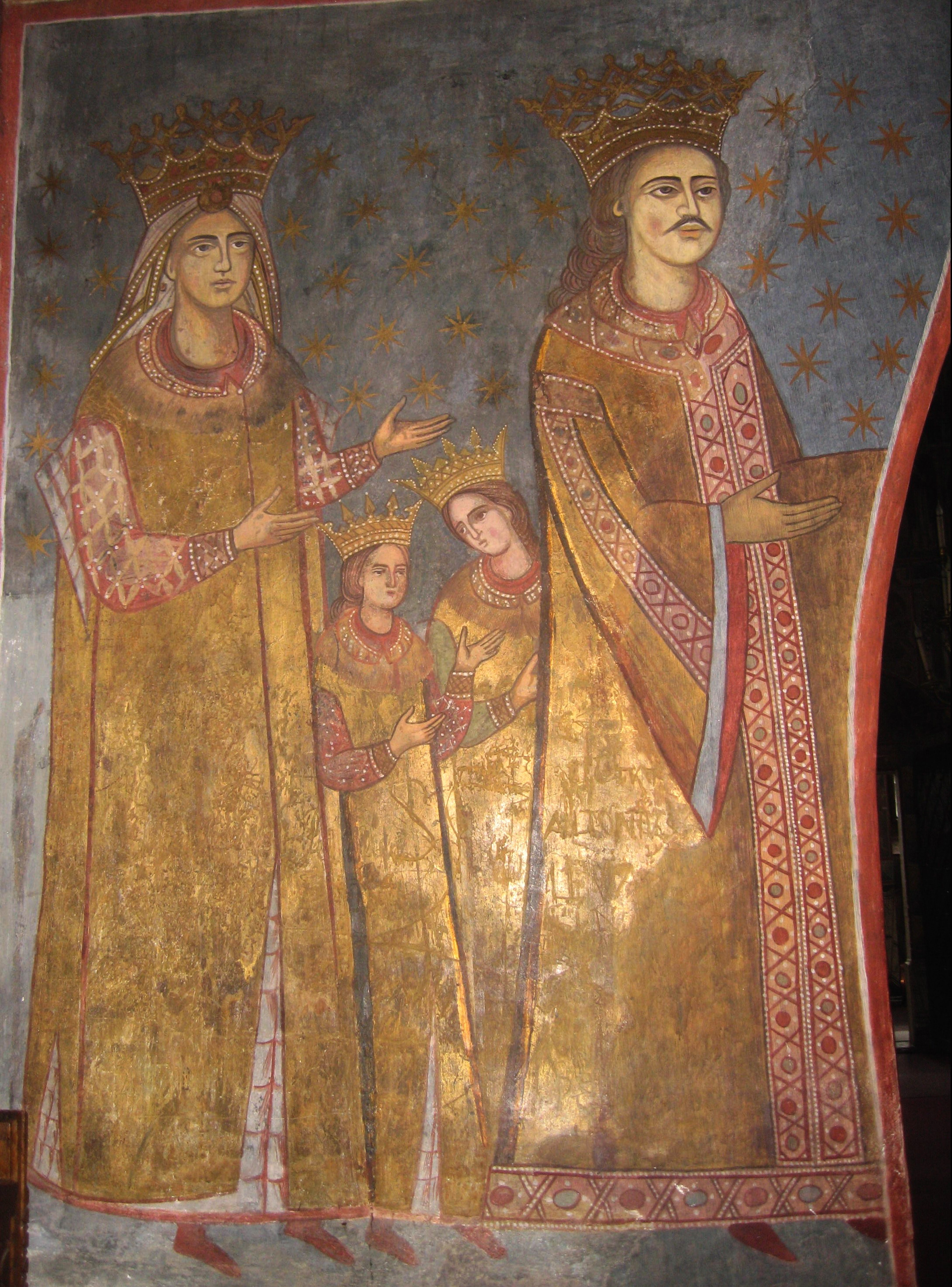

Prince of Moldavia
- Reign: 11 June 1551 – 1 September 1552
- Predecessor: Ilie II Rareș
- Successor: Ioan Joldea
- Born: c. 1530
- Died: 1 September 1552; Țuțora
- Father: Petru Rareș
- Religion: Orthodox

Ștefan VI Rareș (died 1 September 1552) was ruler of Moldavia in 1551 and 1552.

Ștefan was a son of Petru Rareș and succeeded to the Moldavian throne on 11 June 1551 when his brother Ilie II Rareș was forced to abdicate by the Ottoman Empire.

He attempted to create an alliance with the German King Ferdinand I against the Ottomans, but was unsuccessful. He attempted an invasion of Transylvania in 1552, in July, he invaded twice, ravaging Țara Bârsei and Székely Land, but during his retreat he was defeated in the Brassó mountains by Báthory's Transylvanian and Castaldo's mercenary armies. Thereby losing his prestige and when this campaign failed he was assassinated by his boyars.

Ancestors of Ștefan VI Rareș

16. Alexander I of Moldavia
8. Bogdan II of Moldavia
4. Stephen III of Moldavia
2. Petru IV Rareș
10. Rareș
5. (concubine) Maria Răreșoaia
1. Ştefan VI Rareș
24. Đurađ Branković
12. Stefan Branković
25. Irene Kantakouzene
6. Jovan Branković
26. Gjergj Arianiti
13. Angelina Arianiti
27. Maria Muzaka
3. Jelena Branković
28. Jakša
14. Stefan Jakšić
7. Jelena Jakšić

== See also ==
- List of rulers of Moldavia
