= 1451 =

1451 in various calendars
- Gregorian calendar: 1451; MCDLI
- Ab urbe condita: 2204
- Armenian calendar: 900; ԹՎ Ջ
- Assyrian calendar: 6201
- Balinese saka calendar: 1372–1373
- Bengali calendar: 857–858
- Berber calendar: 2401
- English Regnal year: 29 Hen. 6 – 30 Hen. 6
- Buddhist calendar: 1995
- Burmese calendar: 813
- Byzantine calendar: 6959–6960
- Chinese calendar: 庚午年 (Metal Horse); 4148 or 3941 — to — 辛未年 (Metal Goat); 4149 or 3942
- Coptic calendar: 1167–1168
- Discordian calendar: 2617
- Ethiopian calendar: 1443–1444
- Hebrew calendar: 5211–5212
- Hindu calendars
- Vikram Samvat: 1507–1508
- Shaka Samvat: 1372–1373
- Kali Yuga: 4551–4552
- Holocene calendar: 11451
- Igbo calendar: 451–452
- Iranian calendar: 829–830
- Islamic calendar: 854–855
- Japanese calendar: Hōtoku 3 (宝徳３年)
- Javanese calendar: 1366–1367
- Julian calendar: 1451; MCDLI
- Korean calendar: 3784
- Minguo calendar: 461 before ROC 民前461年
- Nanakshahi calendar: −17
- Thai solar calendar: 1993–1994
- Tibetan calendar: ལྕགས་ཕོ་རྟ་ལོ་ (male Iron-Horse); 1577 or 1196 or 424 — to — ལྕགས་མོ་ལུག་ལོ་ (female Iron-Sheep); 1578 or 1197 or 425

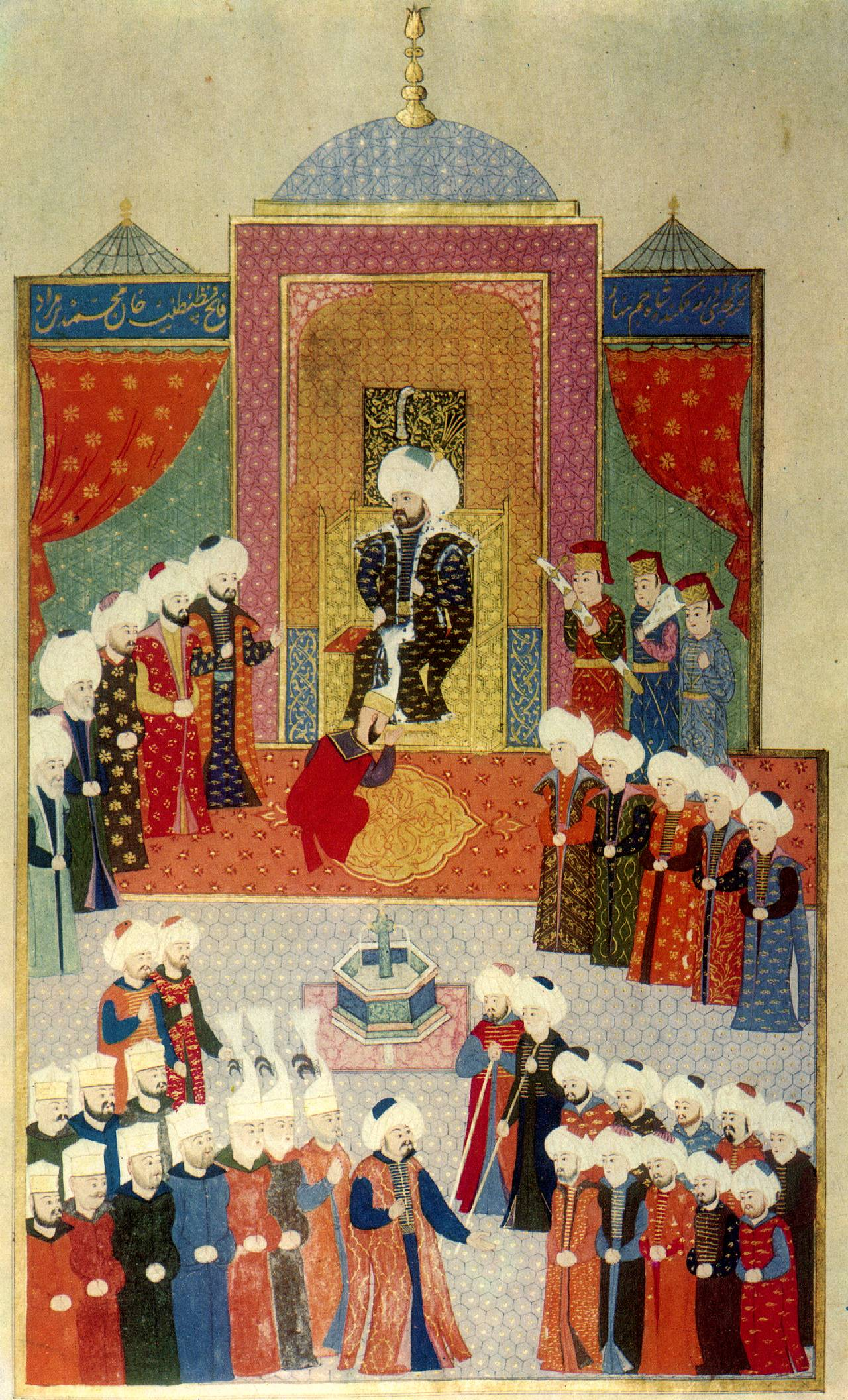
February 18: Mehmed II becomes Sultan of the Ottoman Empire upon the death of his father, Murad II, and makes plans to take Constantinople from Christian rule.

Year 1451 (MCDLI) was a common year starting on Friday of the Julian calendar.

== Events ==
=== January–March ===
- January 7 – Pope Nicholas V issues a Papal Bull to establish The University of Glasgow; classes are initially held in Glasgow Cathedral.
- January 27 – The Saxon Brother War between Frederick II, Elector of Saxony and William III, Landgrave of Thuringia is ended as two brothers sign a peace treaty at Naumburg.
- February 3 – Murad II, Sultan of the Ottoman Empire, dies and is succeeded (on February 18) by his son, Mehmed II.
- February 14 – Louis XI marries Charlotte of Savoy.
- March 26 – The Treaty of Gaeta is signed at the Italian city of Gaeta between the Kingdom of Albania (represented by Nikollë de Berguçi and Stefan, Bishop of Krujë on behalf of Skanderbeg, and the Kingdom of Naples (by King Alfonso. In return for protection of Albania from the Ottoman Empire, Albania agrees to be a vassal of Naples.

=== April–June ===
- April 11 – Celje acquires market town status and town rights, by orders from Count Frederic II of Celje.
- April 19 – In the Delhi Sultanate, the Afghan Lodi Dynasty succeeds the Turkish Sayyid Dynasty as the Sayyid ruler Ala-ud-Din Alam Shah flees Delhi and Bahlul Khan Lodi takes the throne.
- May 30 – (New moon (15th waning) of Nayon 813 ME) At Pegu (now in Myanmar, Binnya Waru, ruler of the Hanthawaddy kingdom, is assassinated by his cousin, Binnya Kyan.
- May 31 – King Henry VI of England gives royal assent to the Attainder of John Cade Act 1450, confiscating the lands of Jack Cade, who had led a rebellion against the King in 1450. Cade is posthumously convicted of treason so that his estate will go directly to the King.
- June 30 – French troops under Jean de Dunois invade Guyenne, and capture Bordeaux.

=== July–September ===
- July 31 – Jacques Coeur, accused of poisoning Agnes Sorel, mistress of King Charles VII of France, is arrested on the orders of the king and his large fortune is confiscated.
- August 14 – A three-year truce is signed between Scotland and England at the Church of St Nicholas at Newcastle-upon-Tyne.
- August 20 – The French capture Bayonne, the last English stronghold in Guyenne.
- September 10 – The Ottoman Empire renews its treaty with Republic of Venice and, on September 20, a truce with the Kingdom of Hungary.

=== October–December ===
- October 17 – After assassinating Bogdan II of Moldavia, Petru Aron takes up the throne.
- October 22 – Janos Hunyadi, Regent-Governor of the Kingdom of Hungary during the minority of the 11-year-old king, Ladislaus V, signs a peace treaty with the Holy Roman Emperor, Friedrich III.
- October 28 – Revolt of Ghent: Ghent takes up arms against Philip the Good, Duke of Burgundy.
- November 20 – Janos Hunyadi, Regent-Governor of the Kingdom of Hungary during the minority of the 11-year-old king, Ladislaus V, signs a 3-year truce with the Ottoman Empire.
- November 28 – At the Korean capital, Hanseong, Hwangbo In becomes the Chief State Councillor (Yeonguijeong) of the Kingdom of Korea as leader of the governing State Council, second in status only to King Munjong, replacing Ha Yeon.
- December 22 – (28 Zilhicce 855 AH) In Mamluk ruled Egypt, the Amir Asanbay al-Jamali al-Zahiri returns from a trip to the Ottoman Empire with a group of Ottoman diplomats, and the Mamluk Sultan Mehmed II hosts them at a banquet, granting them a private audience the next day. The Ottomans depart on January 17.

=== Date unknown ===
- Skennenrahawi, the Great Peacemaker, a chief Mohawk people, founds the Haudenosaunee, commonly called the Iroquois Confederacy, along with Jigonhsasee and Hiawatha. The Haudenosaunee is initially a political and cultural union of five Iroquoian-speaking Native American tribes (the Mohawk, Oneida, Onondaga, Cayuga, and Seneca) governing parts of the present-day state of New York, northern Pennsylvania, and the eastern portion of the provinces of Ontario, and Quebec.

== Births ==
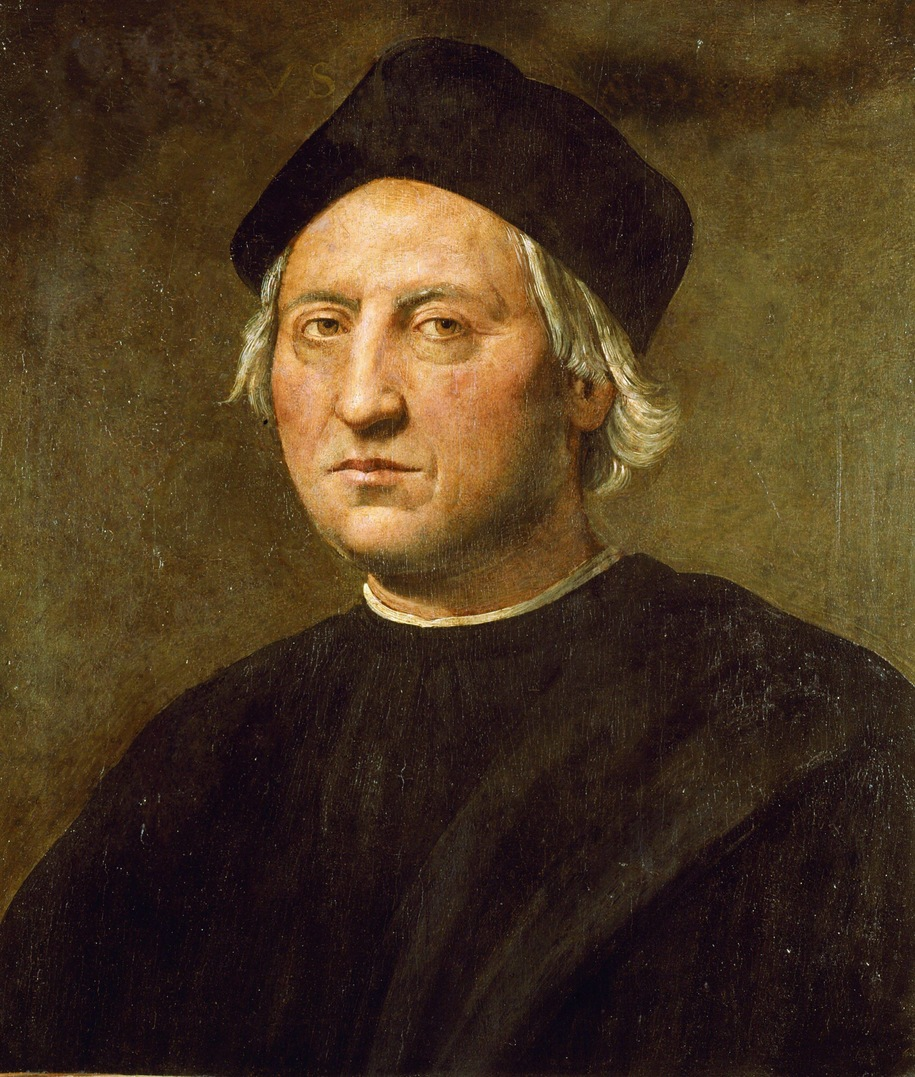
Christopher Columbus

- January 14 – Franchinus Gaffurius, Italian composer (d. 1522)
- January 29 – John, Prince of Portugal (d. 1451)
- February 17 – Raffaello Maffei, Italian theologian (d. 1522)
- March 5 – William Herbert, 2nd Earl of Pembroke, English earl (d. 1491)
- March 9 – Amerigo Vespucci, Italian explorer (d. 1512)
- April 22 – Queen Isabella I of Castile, Castilian queen regnant and first queen of a united Spain (by marriage to Ferdinand of Aragon) (d. 1504)
- May 2 – René II, Duke of Lorraine (d. 1508)
- May 17 – Engelbert II of Nassau, Count of Nassau-Vianden and Lord of Breda (1475–1504) (d. 1504)
- June 1 – Giles Daubeney, 1st Baron Daubeney, English soldier, diplomat, courtier and politician (d. 1508)
- July 10 – James III of Scotland (d. 1488)
- September 5 – Isabel Neville, Duchess of Clarence, elder daughter of Richard Neville (d. 1476)
- November 29 – Elisabeth of Brandenburg, Duchess of Württemberg (d. 1524)
- date unknown
  - Christopher Columbus, Italian-born explorer (d. 1506)
  - Ignatius Noah of Lebanon, Syriac Orthodox patriarch of Antioch (d. 1509).
  - Guru Jambheshwar, Rajasthani founder of the Bishnoi Panth (d. 1536)

== Deaths ==
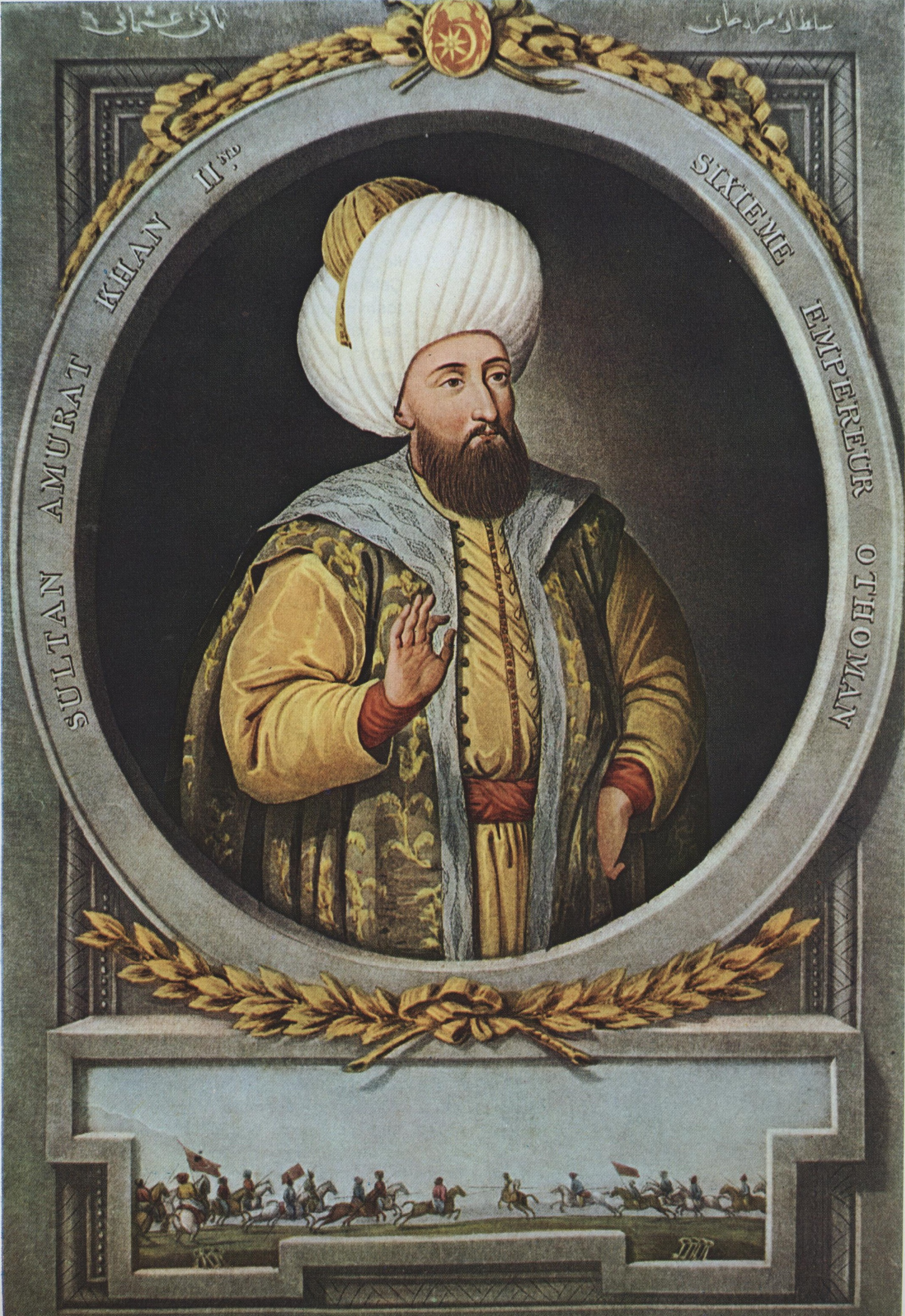
Sultan Murad II

- January 7 – Amadeus VIII, Duke of Savoy, aka Antipope Felix V (b. 1383)
- January 18 – Henry II, Count of Nassau-Siegen, Co-ruler of Nassau-Siegen (1442–1451) (b. 1414)
- February 3 – Murad II, Ottoman Sultan (b. 1404)
- June – Abdullah Mirza, Timurid Empire ruler
- July 11 – Barbara of Cilli, Holy Roman Empress, queen consort of Hungary and Bohemia (b. 1392)
- October – Bogdan II of Moldavia, assassinated by Petru Aron
- date unknown
  - Stefan Lochner, German painter (b. 1400)
  - John Lydgate, English monk and poet (b. 1370)
  - al-Mustakfi II, Abbasid Caliph
