= 1449 =

1449 in various calendars
- Gregorian calendar: 1449; MCDXLIX
- Ab urbe condita: 2202
- Armenian calendar: 898; ԹՎ ՊՂԸ
- Assyrian calendar: 6199
- Balinese saka calendar: 1370–1371
- Bengali calendar: 855–856
- Berber calendar: 2399
- English Regnal year: 27 Hen. 6 – 28 Hen. 6
- Buddhist calendar: 1993
- Burmese calendar: 811
- Byzantine calendar: 6957–6958
- Chinese calendar: 戊辰年 (Earth Dragon); 4146 or 3939 — to — 己巳年 (Earth Snake); 4147 or 3940
- Coptic calendar: 1165–1166
- Discordian calendar: 2615
- Ethiopian calendar: 1441–1442
- Hebrew calendar: 5209–5210
- Hindu calendars
- Vikram Samvat: 1505–1506
- Shaka Samvat: 1370–1371
- Kali Yuga: 4549–4550
- Holocene calendar: 11449
- Igbo calendar: 449–450
- Iranian calendar: 827–828
- Islamic calendar: 852–853
- Japanese calendar: Bun'an 6 / Hōtoku 1 (宝徳元年)
- Javanese calendar: 1364–1365
- Julian calendar: 1449; MCDXLIX
- Korean calendar: 3782
- Minguo calendar: 463 before ROC 民前463年
- Nanakshahi calendar: −19
- Thai solar calendar: 1991–1992
- Tibetan calendar: ས་ཕོ་འབྲུག་ལོ་ (male Earth-Dragon); 1575 or 1194 or 422 — to — ས་མོ་སྦྲུལ་ལོ་ (female Earth-Snake); 1576 or 1195 or 423

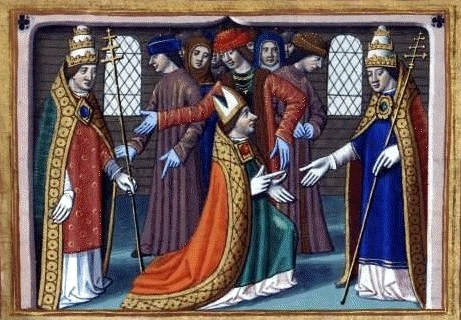
April 19: The former Antipope Felix V swears loyalty to Pope Nicholas V.

Year 1449 (MCDXLIX) was a common year starting on Wednesday of the Julian calendar.

== Events ==
=== January–March ===
- January 2 – King Henry VI of England summons the members of parliament, directing them to assemble on February 12 at Westminster.
- January 6 – Constantine XI Palaiologos is crowned Byzantine Emperor at Mistra; he will be the last in a line of rulers that can be traced to the founding of Rome.
- February 12 –The English Parliament is opened by King Henry VI at Westminster for a five month session.
- February – Alexăndrel seizes the throne of Moldavia, with the support of the boyars.
- March 24 – Hundred Years' War: English forces capture Fougères in Brittany.

=== April–June ===
- April 7 – The last Antipope, Felix V, abdicates.
- April 19 – Pope Nicholas V is elected by the Council of Basel.
- April 25 – The Council of Basel dissolves itself.
- May – An English privateering fleet led by Robert Wennington challenges ships of the Hanseatic League.
- May 14 – Second Siege of Sfetigrad (1449): The Albanian garrison surrenders and the Ottomans seize the fortress.
- May 20 – Battle of Alfarrobeira: King Afonso V of Portugal defeats the forces of Peter, Duke of Coimbra.
- June 4 – Erik of Pomerania, formerly the King of Sweden, Denmark and Norway, hands over possession of the island of Gotland to the Swedish invaders.
- June 8 – The Pas de la Bergère tournament, later the subject of a poem by Louis de Beauvau, finishes after six days at Tarascon on the island of Jarnègues at the estate of the Duke René of Anjou.
- June 18 – Mary of Guelders arrives in Scotland at Leith after being escorted from the Duchy of Burgundy to Scotland following her selection by Lord Crichton

=== July–September ===
- July 3 – King James II of Scotland marries Mary of Guelders at Holyrood Abbey in Edinburgh.
- July 6 – The Ambrosian Republic of Milan defeats the armies of the Swiss canton of Uri at the Battle of Castione in what is now Switzerland.
- July 16 – The English Parliament closes and King Henry VI gives royal assent to numerous acts passed during its five-month session. Becoming law are the Importation Act, a 7-year ban on the import of Netherlands merchandise from Holland, Zeeland and Brabant, and the Distress Act, making it a felony "for any Welsh or Lancashire man to take other men, their goods or chattels, under colour of distress, where they have no cause."
- July 20 – News arrives at the imperial court of the Emperor Yingzong of China of a Mongol invasion from the north, led by the Khagan Esen Taishi. Yingzong orders the dispatch of 45,000 soldiers from the Beijing garrison, led by four generals, to advance to Datong and Xuanfu to guard the border.
- July – Hundred Years' War: The French invade Normandy.
- August 1 – After getting word that the Mongols had launched a large-scale invasion at Datong, China's Emperor Yingzong decides to personally lead the Beijing garrison into war, despite the protests of his War Minister Kuang Ye.
- August 3 – The Emperor Yingzong designates his younger brother, Zhu Qiyu, to administer the Chinese Empire.
- August 13 – First Margrave War: Margrave Albrecht takes Lichtenau Fortress from Nuremberg.
- September 1 – Battle of Tumu Fortress: The Oirat Mongols defeat the Ming dynasty army, and capture the Emperor Xingzong of China on September 3. The Emperor is officially deposed, while his brother Zhu Qiyu ascends as the Jingtai Emperor the next year.

=== October–December ===
- October 12 – Prince Alexăndrel is replaced as Prince of Moldavia by Bogdan II.
- October 29 – The French recapture Rouen from the English.
- October – Bogdan II of Moldavia enters the country with troops from John Hunyadi, and takes the throne after Alexăndrel flees.
- November 20 – Karl Knutsson, reigning as King Karl VIII of Sweden, is crowned as King Karl I of Norway in a ceremony at Nidaros Cathedral in Trondheim.
- December 15 – The Ottoman Empire Sultan Mehmed II marries Sittişah Hatun, daughter of Suleiman of Dulkadir, in an elaborate ceremony at Edirne, followed by three months of celebrations.

== Births ==
- January 1 – Lorenzo de' Medici, Italian statesman (d. 1492)
- January 17 – Osanna of Mantua, Italian Dominican tertiary (d. 1505)
- February 7 – Adriana of Nassau-Siegen, consort of Count Philip I of Hanau-Münzenberg (d. 1477)
- April 27 – Asakura Ujikage, 8th head of the Asakura clan of Japan (d. 1486)
- August 10 – Bona of Savoy, Duchess of Savoy (d. 1503)
- September 20 – Philipp I, Count of Hanau-Münzenberg, German noble (d. 1500)
- October 21 – George Plantagenet, Duke of Clarence, brother of Kings Edward IV and Richard III of England (d. 1478)
- November 11 – Catherine of Poděbrady, Hungarian Queen (d. 1464)
- November 14 – Sidonie of Poděbrady, Bohemian princess, duchess consort of Saxony (d. 1510)
- December 6 – Dorotea Gonzaga, Italian noble (d. 1467)
- date unknown
  - Aldus Manutius, Italian printer
  - Archibald Douglas, 5th Earl of Angus (d. 1513)
  - Axayacatl, Aztec ruler of Tenochtitlan (d. 1481)
  - Domenico Gagini, Italian sculptor (d. 1492)
  - Domenico Ghirlandaio, Italian artist (d. 1494)
  - Magnus Hundt, German physician and theologian (d. 1519)
  - Margaret of Thuringia, Electress consort of Brandenburg (d. 1501)
- probable
  - Ilham Ghali khan of Kazan Khanate, (d. 1490)
  - Srimanta Sankardeva, Assamese scholar and religious figure (d. c. 1568)
  - Mandukhai Khatun, Mongolian queen

== Deaths ==
- January 4 – Cecilia of Brandenburg, Duchess of Brunswick-Wolfenbüttel (b. c.1405)
- January 21 – Giovanni Berardi, Archbishop of Taranto (b. 1380)
- February 2 – Ibn Hajar al-Asqalani, Islamic scholar (b. 1372)
- March – Dolce dell'Anguillara, Italian condottiero (b. 1401)
- May – Alexander of Islay, Earl of Ross, Lord of the Isles
- May 20 (at the Battle of Alfarrobeira)
  - Álvaro Vaz de Almada, 1st Count of Avranches
  - Peter, Duke of Coimbra (b. 1392)
- June 1 – Polissena Sforza, Lady of Rimini (b. 1428)
- August 13 – Louis IV, Elector Palatine (b. 1424)
- October 27 – Ulugh Beg, Timurid ruler and astronomer (b. 1394)
- October 31 – Elisabeth of Brandenburg, Duchess of Brzeg-Legnica and Cieszyn, German princess (b. 1403)
- November 19 – Kunigunde of Sternberg, first spouse of the King George of Podebrady (b. 1425)
- December 24 – Walter Bower, Scottish chronicler (b. 1385)
