= Ioan Joldea =

Prince of Moldavia in 1552

Ioan I (Ioan Joldea)
- Prince of Moldavia
- Reign: September 1552
- Predecessor: Ștefan VI Rareș
- Successor: Alexandru Lăpușneanu

Ioan I Joldea (pronunciation: [jo̯an-ʒolde̯a]) was Prince of Moldavia for a few days in September 1552.

== Reign ==
Ioan Joldea, a Moldavian boyar, was chosen lord in Țuțora by the Sturza and Moghila boyars, after the murder of Ștefan VI Rareș on 8 September 1552. This fact sparked hostilities in Kraków. King Sigismund II Augustus was going to enthrone Alexandru Lăpușneanu, the son of Bogdan III the One-Eyed, in Suceava. Joldea had chosen Ruxandra, the daughter of Petru Rareș, as his wife, in order to be entitled to occupy the throne of the country.

Joldea was heading to Suceava to be appointed lord, but his mistake was the stop at Șipote. Lăpușneanu, with support from the nobles Mikołaj Sieniawski and Moțoc, tricked Joldea and his loyal boyars. Joldea was mutilated and removed by Lăpușneanu.
