= Stephen V =

Stephen V may refer to:

- Pope Stephen IV, aka Stephen V, Pope from 816 to 817
- Pope Stephen V (885–891)
- Stephen V of Hungary (born before 1239 – 1272), King of Hungary and Croatia, Duke of Styria
- Stephen V Báthory (1430–1493), Hungarian commander, judge of the Royal Court and Prince of Transylvania
- Stephen V of Moldavia (r. 1538–1540)
