= Arbore Church =

Orthodox church in Suceava County, Romania

Coordinates: 47.7331°N 25.9292°E

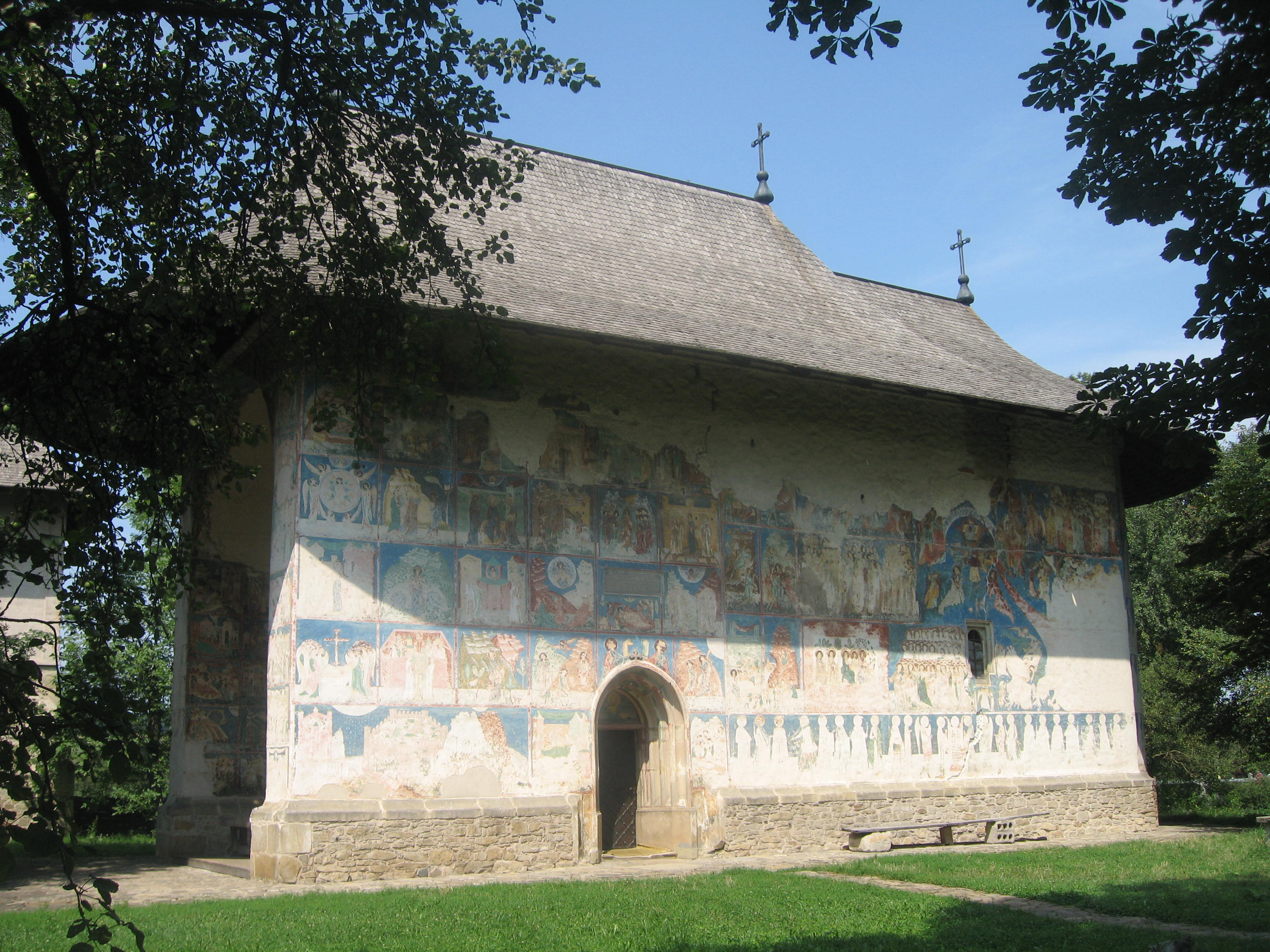
Arbore Church

The Arbore Church (Romanian: Biserica Arbore) is a Romanian Orthodox monastery church in Arbore Commune, Suceava County, Romania. Built in 1502 by Luca Arbore, and dedicated to the Beheading of St. John the Baptist, it is one of eight buildings that make up the churches of Moldavia UNESCO World Heritage Site. It is also listed as a historic monument by the country's Ministry of Culture and Religious Affairs.
