= Moldavian–Wallachian War =

War between Moldavian and Wallachia during 1506–1514

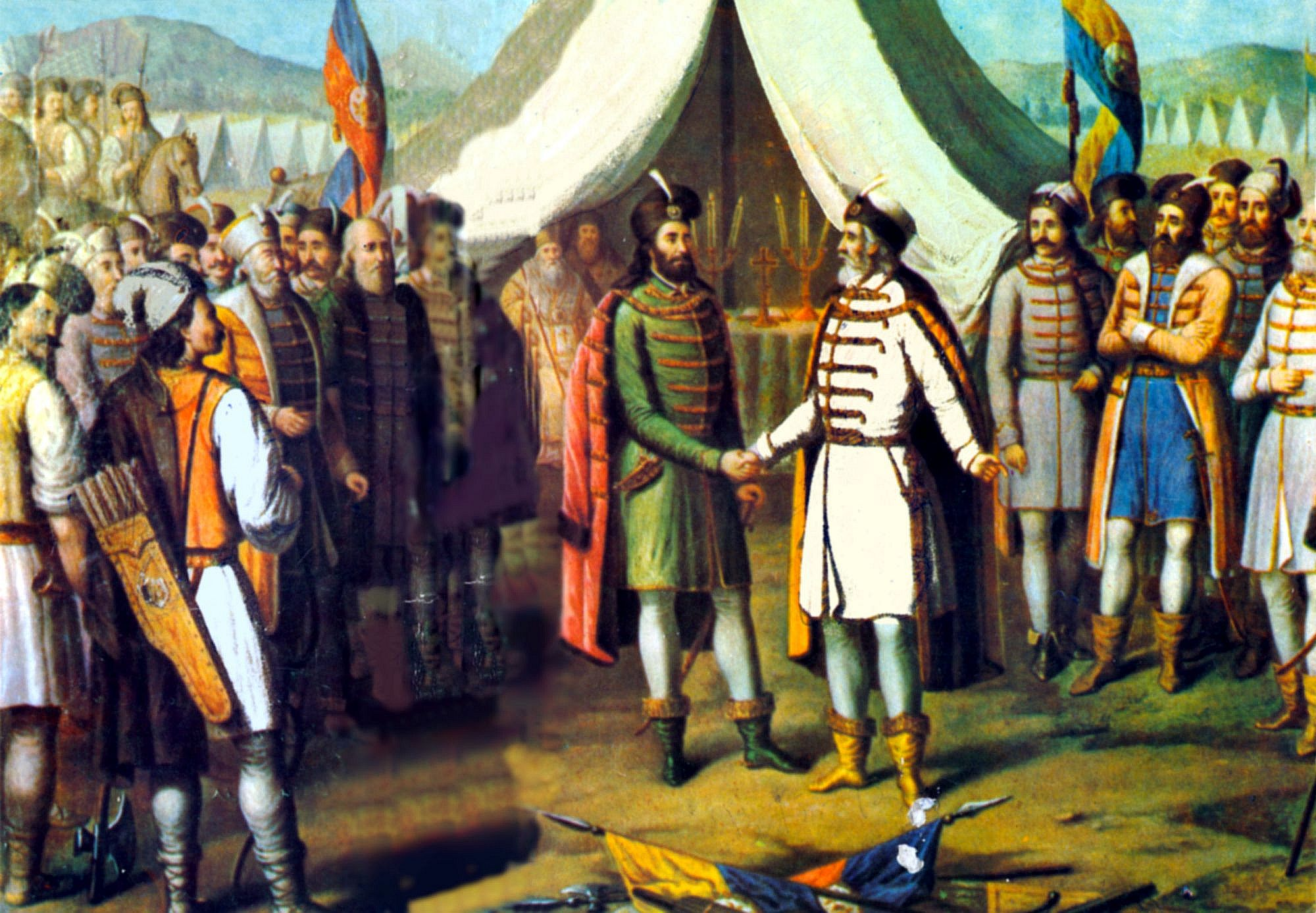
- Negotiations between Bogdan III and Radu IV in 1506
Date	July 1506 – February 1514
Location	Moldavia, Wallachia
Result	Moldavian victory
Territorial changes	Colossal economic damage to Wallachia

Belligerents
Moldavia	Wallachia; Moldavian opposition Transylvania (1514)

Commanders and leaders
Bogdan III	Radu IV # Neagoe Basarab; Pribeagu †

Strength
Unknown	Unknown

Casualties and losses
Unknown	Very heavy

The Moldavian–Wallachian War was fought from July 1506 to February 1514 on the territory of both Moldavia and Wallachia. It was caused by the direct military involvement of Wallachia in support of the pretender Roman Pribeagu ("Trifăilă") that sought to seize the Moldavian throne and oust Bogdan III from power. The war resulted in the death of the pretender and colossal economic losses in the region after the destruction of Brăila.

== Prelude ==
The Principality of Moldavia was consolidated under the rule of voivode Stephen the Great. After his death in 1504, the principality plunged into internal conflicts between its boyars. There was at least seven pretenders for the Moldavian throne, supported by the rivaling boyars and states against Stephen's son, Bogdan III. The main pretender for the throne during this time was identified by historian Nicolae Iorga as Roman, who as backed by the neighbouring Principality of Wallachia.

In 1503, as a result of the new Moldavian–Polish War, Wallachian voivode Radu IV was pursued by the Poles to attack Moldavia from the southwest. Radu IV was on bad terms with the neighbouring Moldavia, seeing this as an opportunity to attack the principality and put the pro-Wallachian pretender on the throne.

== War ==
=== July – November 1506 ===
The war begun in July 1506 (with the date incorrectly set by Moldavian-Polish chronicle and Ureche as October 1507). According to Ureche's chronicle, the Wallachian voivode Radu IV with pretender Roman Pribeagu had "entered the country and plundered the land of Putna and on the other side of the Siretu, they made much plunder and destruction. And of course, they returned without any trouble". The Moldavians likely responded with raids into Wallachia shortly after, prior to October as news of the conflict had reached Sibiu during this month.

The peace between the two principalities was concluded on 28 November 1506. Although the treaty required for Radu IV to hand over Roman, he refused to do so on the basis that he "did not know his place of refuge". However, Radu IV forbidden Roman to launch new attacks on Moldavia and requested for him to remain in hiding. In such environment, Roman decided to leave Wallachia and take refuge in Transylvania. Roman would shortly disappear from the public after initially being welcomed, with another pretender rising under the name of Mircea in pursuit of Wallachian throne, but who would get imprisoned in Buda before another conflict would break out between Moldavia and Wallachia.

=== March – April 1512 ===
Prior to March of 1512, Bogdan III concluded a peace treaty with the Crimean Khanate, in order to prevent Tatar raids on Moldavia that occurred during previous years. In early March, Polish king Sigismund I the Old announced to the Poznań castellan that Moldavia had attacked Wallachia, but was unwilling support Wallachians and wanted for Bogdan III to refrain from his alliance with Tatars.

In mid-April 1512, the Moldavian-Wallachian war was in full swing, with Bogdan III attempting to eliminate the Wallachian-backed pretender for the Moldavian throne. Neagoe Basarab was prepared, repelling the Moldavian attack in a cavalry battle. However, Moldavians managed to sack Brăila, which led to heavy economic losses for Wallachia, Transylvania and even Hungary as a whole. The following year, pretender Mircea returned from imprisonment in Buda. However, Neagoe ordered for to Murcea's capture, with his nose cut off and for him to be sent to Istanbul, which was regarded as a betrayal on the part of Wallachian voivode by Transylvanians.

=== January – February 1514 ===
In January 1514, pretender Roman Pribeagu under the nickname "Trifăilă" would make his return and invade Moldavia with Wallachian and Transylvanian support. South of Moldavia was occupied by the pretender and his Wallachian allies. A battle would take place between the Moldavian and Wallachian-Transylvanian armies at Poduri, below Vaslui, on 27 February. This battle would lead to the death of pretender Pribeagu and heavy losses for the Wallachian-Transylvanian forces.

== Aftermath ==
Bogdan III likely did not launch any retaliatory raids into Wallachia after the pretender Roman Pribeagu was eliminated and the invading Wallachian-Transylvanian armies were defeated. However, the most important consequence of this war occurred as a result of the Moldavian destruction of the Wallachian port of Brăila in 1512, which undermined Wallachian and Transylvanian economies, leading to their increased dependence on the Ottoman Empire. As the port was brought fully under Ottoman control, Moldavia was also impacted, since it completed vassalization of the Danubian principalities by the Porte.
