= Alexăndrel of Moldavia =

Alexăndrel

Prince of Moldavia (1st reign)
- Reign: February – 12 October 1449
- Predecessor: Petru III
- Successor: Bogdan II

Prince of Moldavia (2nd reign)
- Reign: February 1452 – August 1454
- Predecessor: Bogdan II
- Successor: Peter Aaron

Prince of Moldavia (3rd reign)
- Reign: February – 25 May 1455
- Predecessor: Peter Aaron
- Successor: Peter Aaron
- Born: 1429
- Died: 25 May 1455 (aged 25–26); Bilhorod-Dnistrovskyi
- Spouse: unmarried
- Dynasty: Bogdan-Mușat
- Father: Iliaș of Moldavia
- Mother: Maria of Halshany
- Religion: Orthodox

Alexăndrel or Alexandru II (1429 – 25 May 1455), son of Iliaș of Moldavia, was the prince (or voivode) of Moldavia in 1449, from 1452 to 1454, and in 1455.

== Life ==
He preferred the alliance with the Polish–Lithuanian Commonwealth, in contrast with Peter III of Moldavia, who was protégé of John Hunyadi, Governor of Hungary. The influence of Hungary weakened after the Ottomans defeated Hunyadi's army in the second Battle of Kosovo in October 1448. With the support of boyars who preferred an alliance with the Commonwealth, Alexăndrel expelled Peter III from Moldavia and seized the throne in February 1449. He confirmed the privileges of the merchants of Brașov. According to the Moldavian-Polish chronicle, Alexăndrel also ceded Chilia (now Kiliya in Ukraine) to Hungary, but two other Moldavian chronicles attribute the same act to his predecessor. In October 1449, Hunyadi's other protégé, Bogdan II broke into Moldavia, forcing Alexăndrel to flee.

After Bogdan was murdered, Alexăndrel and Petru Aron divided Moldavia among themselves. Alexăndrel took control of southern Moldavia. He united Moldavia with the support of Hunyadi. He signed a treaty with Hunyadi on 16 February 1453, recognizing him as the protector of Moldavia. Petru Aaron expelled him from Moldavia in March or May 1455.

== Sources ==
- Ciobanu, Veniamin (1991). "The equilibrium policy of the Romanian principalities in East-Central Europe, 1444–1485". In Treptow, Kurt W. (ed.). Dracula: Essays on the Life and Times of Vlad Țepeș. East European Monographs, Distributed by Columbia University Press. pp. 29–52. ISBN 0-88033-220-4.
- Mureşanu, Camil (2001). John Hunyadi: Defender of Christendom. The Center for Romanian Studies. ISBN 973-9432-18-2.
- Treptow, Kurt W.; Popa, Marcel (1996). Historical Dictionary of Romania. Scarecrow Press, Inc. ISBN 0-8108-3179-1.

Preceded by Petru III	Voivode of Moldavia; 1449	Succeeded by Bogdan II
Preceded by Bogdan II	Voivode of Moldavia; 1452–1454	Succeeded by Petru Aron
Preceded by Petru Aron	Voivode of Moldavia; 1455	Succeeded by Petru Aron
