= Stephen IV of Moldavia =

Prince of Moldavia from 1517 to 1527

Stephen IV
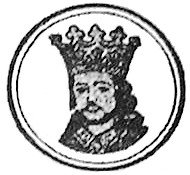

Prince of Moldavia
- Reign: 20 April 1517 – 14 January 1527
- Predecessor: Bogdan III the One-Eyed
- Successor: Petru Rareș
- Born: 1506
- Died: 14 January 1527 (aged 20–21); Khotyn
- Issue: John III the Terrible
- Dynasty: Bogdan-Mușat
- Father: Bogdan III the One-Eyed
- Religion: Orthodox

Stephen IV of Moldavia (Romanian: Ștefan IV; 1506 – 14 January 1527), also called Ștefăniță, was Prince of Moldavia from 1517 to 1527. He succeeded to the throne as son of the previous ruler, Bogdan III cel Chior. Until 1523, he was under the regency of Luca Arbore, Gatekeeper of Suceava. He was the father of John III the Terrible.

Preceded by Bogdan III cel Chior	Prince of Moldavia; 1517–1527	Succeeded by Petru IV Rareş
