= Peter Aaron =

Prince of Moldavia

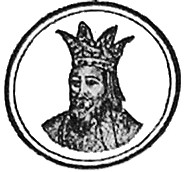

Prince of Moldavia (1st reign)
- Reign: October 1451 – February 1452
- Predecessor: Bogdan II of Moldavia
- Successor: Alexăndrel of Moldavia

Prince of Moldavia (2nd reign)
- Reign: August 1454 – February 1455
- Predecessor: Alexăndrel of Moldavia
- Successor: Alexăndrel of Moldavia

Prince of Moldavia (3rd reign)
- Reign: May 1455 – April 1457
- Predecessor: Alexăndrel of Moldavia
- Successor: Stephen III of Moldavia
- Born: 1419/1421
- Died: 1467
- Dynasty: Bogdan-Mușat
- Father: Alexandru cel Bun
- Religion: Orthodox

Peter III Aaron (Romanian: Petru Aron; died 1467), bastard son of Alexandru cel Bun, was a Voivode (Prince) of Moldavia on three occasions: October 1451 to February 1452, August 1454 to February 1455, and May 1455 to April 1457. The first two were during a civil war with Alexăndrel.

== Background ==
Peter Aaron ascended to the throne after assassinating Bogdan II, while the latter was at a wedding in Rauseni. Immediately, his rule was challenged by Alexăndrel, whom Peter managed to defeat in March 1455, forcing Alexăndrel to take refuge in the fortress at Cetatea Albă.

Peter confirmed his father's commercial privileges awarded to Polish traders in Moldavia, and took an oath of vassalage to King Casimir IV. In 1456, Peter agreed to pay the Ottomans a tribute of 2,000 gold ducats, in order to ensure his southern borders, thus becoming the first of the Moldavian rulers to accept the Turkish demands.

The real challenge to his throne came with Bogdan II's son Ștefan cel Mare. The young prince had been given the protection of Kingdom of Hungary captain-general John Hunyadi and, after John's death, that of Vlad the Impaler (Vlad Țepeș) – the new Prince of Wallachia. According to the interpretation of the account in the Chronicle of Putna Vlad had offered Ștefan his full support for his venture. In April 1457, after two battles, Peter was deposed and had to flee, taking refuge first in Poland and then in Székely Land. There, he played a part in increasing the tensions between Ștefan cel Mare and King Matthias Corvinus. Following Matthias's incursion and subsequent defeat at the Battle of Baia (15 December 1467), Peter was captured and executed.

Peter Aaron issued new billon and copper currency – on the grosh design but struck in better silver, probably as a part of a reform in monetary standards.

== Notes ==
Preceded by Bogdan II	Voivode of Moldavia; 1451–1452	Succeeded by Alexăndrel
Preceded by Alexăndrel	Voivode of Moldavia; 1454–1455	Succeeded by Alexăndrel
Preceded by Alexăndrel	Voivode of Moldavia; 1455–1457	Succeeded by Ștefan cel Mare
