= Probota Monastery =

Monastery in Probota, Romania

Coordinates: 47.3750619°N 26.623564°E

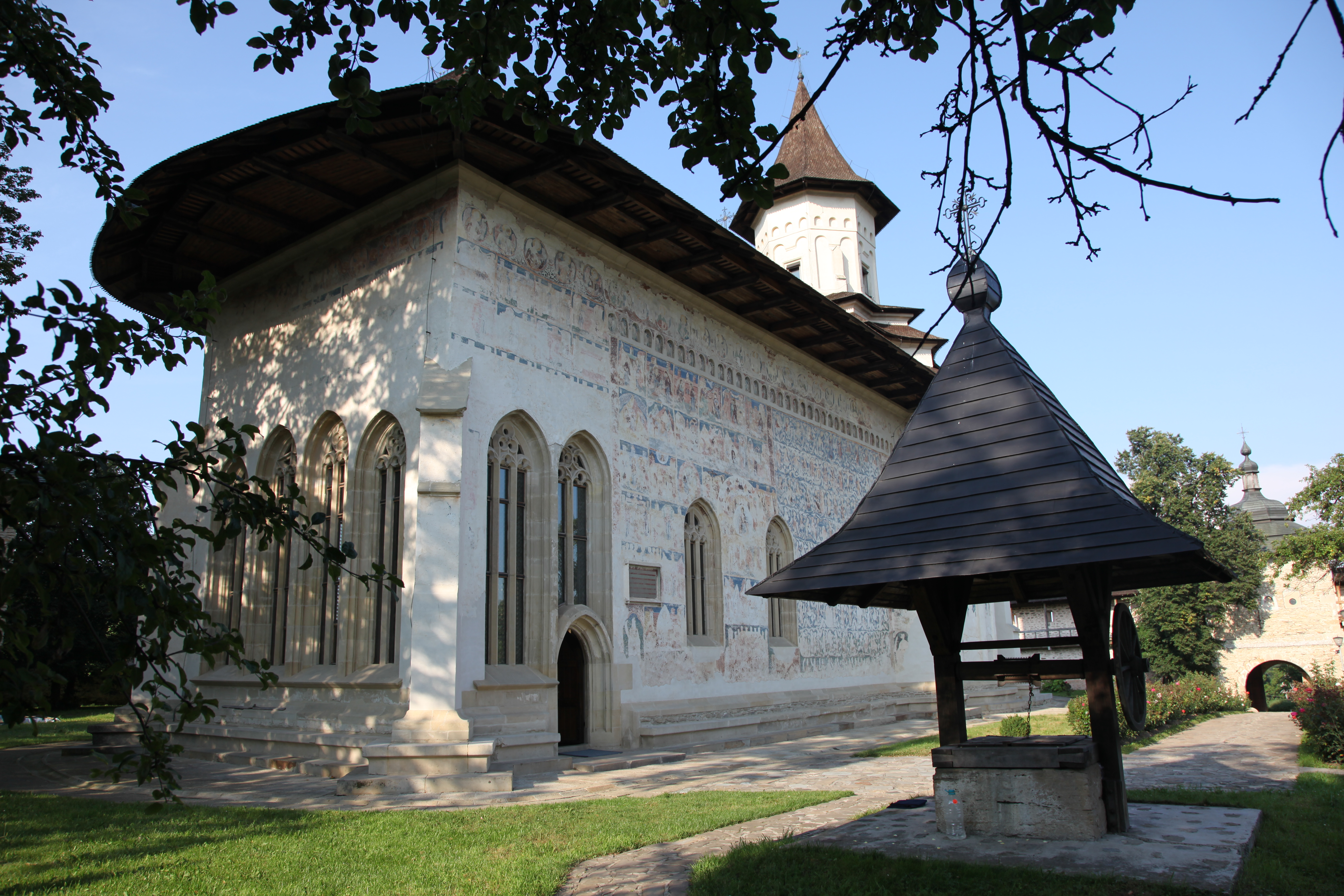
The monastery church, dedicated to Saint Nicholas

Probota Monastery (Romanian: Mănăstirea Probota) is a Romanian Orthodox monastery in Probota village, Dolhasca town, Suceava County, Romania. Built in 1530, with Peter IV Rareș as ktitor (founder), it is one of eight buildings that make up the Churches of Moldavia UNESCO World Heritage Site, and is also listed as a historic monument by the country's Ministry of Culture and Religious Affairs.

== Burials ==
- Petru Rareș
