= Alexandru Lăpușneanu =

- Voivode of Moldavia
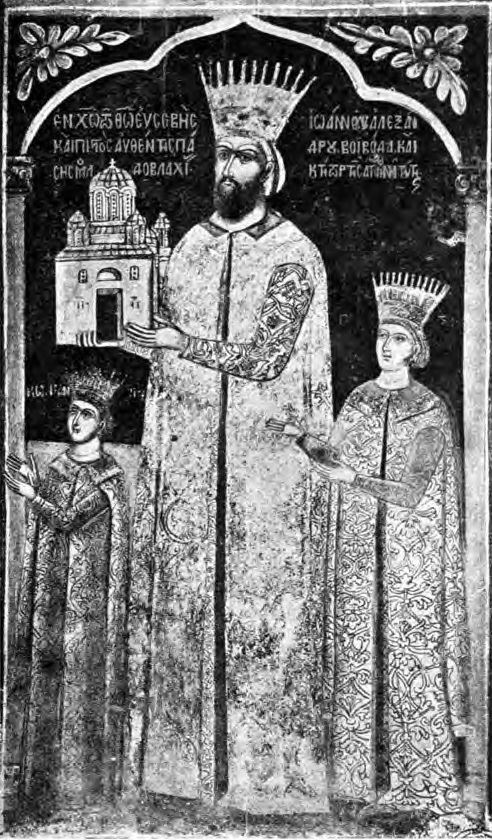

Prince of Moldavia (1st reign)
- Reign: September 1552 – 18 November 1561
- Predecessor: Ioan I Joldea
- Successor: Ioan II Iacob Heraclid

Prince of Moldavia (2nd reign)
- Reign: October 1564 – 5 May 1568
- Predecessor: Ștefan VII Tomșa
- Successor: Bogdan IV of Moldavia
- Born: 1499; Lăpușna, Principality of Moldavia
- Died: 5 May 1568 (aged 68-69); Principality of Moldavia
- Spouse: Doamna Ruxandra of Moldavia
- Issue: Bogdan IV of Moldavia; Ștefan; Aaron the Tyrant; Peter the Cossack; Iliaș; Petru
- House: House of Mușat
- Father: Bogdan III the One-Eyed
- Mother: Anastasia of Lăpușna
- Religion: Eastern Orthodox Church

Alexandru IV Lăpușneanu (1499 – 5 May 1568) was ruler of Moldavia between September 1552 and 18 November 1561 and then October 1564 to 5 May 1568. He was the son of Bogdan III the One-Eyed. His wife and consort was Doamna Ruxanda Lăpușneanu, the daughter of Peter IV Rareș and Princess Elena Ecaterina Rareș (the second daughter of Jovan Branković of Serbia). He was the original founder of the Dormition Church, Lviv, also commonly known as the Wallachian Church. His son Bogdan IV of Moldavia succeeded him and ruled 1568–1572.

The writer Constantin Negruzzi wrote the short story Alexandru Lăpușneanu in 1857 based on the ruler's life; it was turned into an opera by Alexandru Zirra.

Regnal titles
Preceded by Ioan Joldea	Ruler of Moldavia; 1552–1561	Succeeded by Iacob Heraclid
Preceded by Ștefan Tomșa	Ruler of Moldavia; 1564–1568	Succeeded by Bogdan IV
