= Bogdan IV of Moldavia =

Bogdan IV
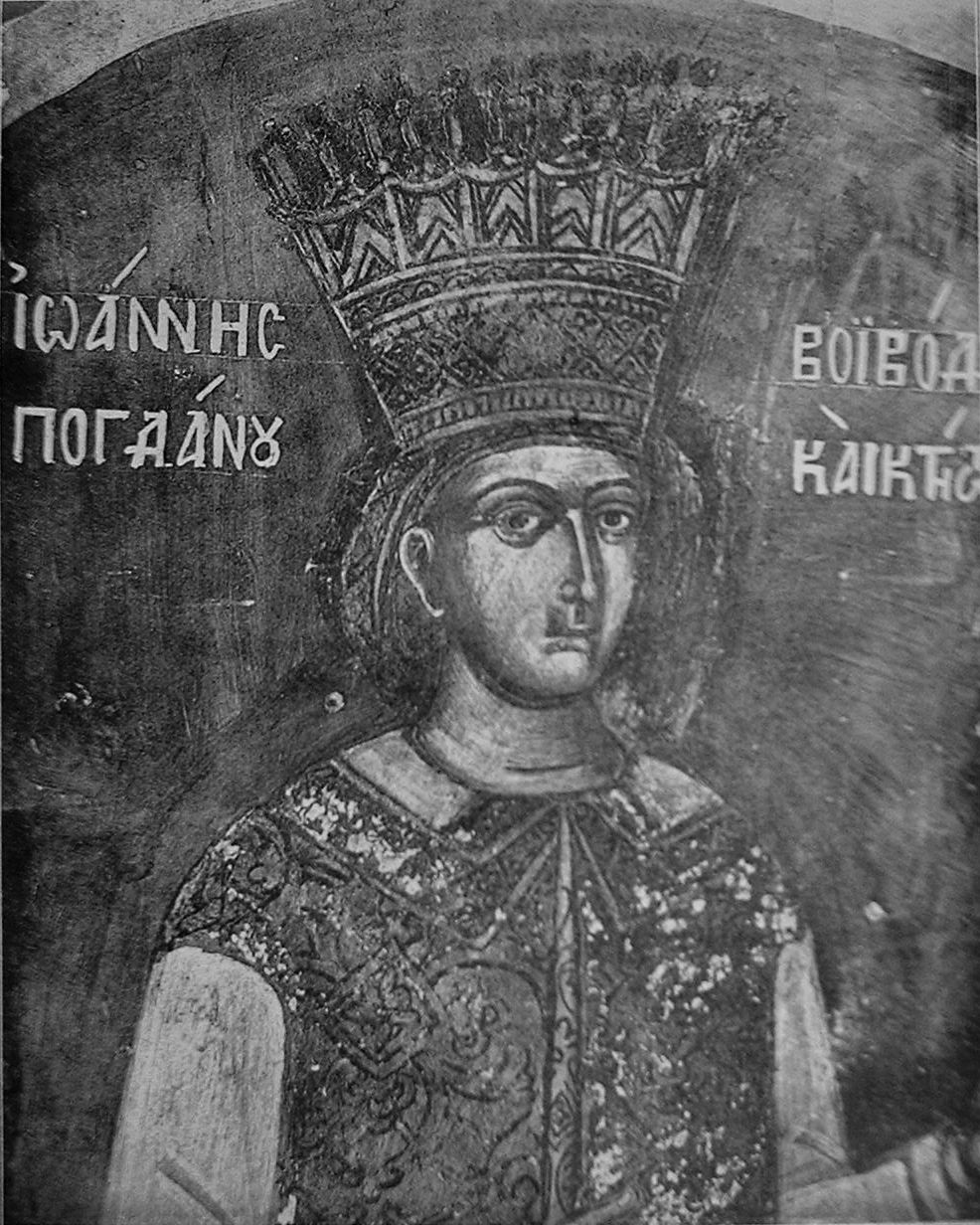

Prince of Moldavia
- Reign: May 1568 – February 1572
- Predecessor: Alexandru Lăpușneanu
- Successor: John III the Terrible
- Born: 9 May 1555
- Died: July 1574 (Aged 19); Moscow
- Issue: Alexandru cel Rău
- Dynasty: Bogdan-Mușat
- Father: Alexandru Lăpușneanu
- Religion: Orthodox

Bogdan IV of Moldavia (9 May 1555 – July 1574) was Prince of Moldavia from 1568 to 1572. He succeeded to the throne as son of the previous ruler, Alexandru Lăpușneanu.

Preceded by Alexandru Lăpușneanu	Prince of Moldavia; 1568–1572	Succeeded by Ioan III the Terrible
