= Miloš Belmužević =

Serbian nobleman and general

Miloš Belmužević (15th century) held the noble title de Saswar given to him by King Matthias Corvinus along with properties near Timișoara. He, the brothers Stefan (Miloš's son-in-law) and Dmitar Jakšić, Vuk Grgurević, Đurađ Branković, his three sons Grgur, Stefan, and Lazar of the famed Branković dynasty, and other Serbian noblemen were instrumental in resettling and populating the vast military frontier that divided Christendom from Islam as it was viewed at the time.

== Biography ==
Miloš Belmužević was a Serbian nobleman, the son of Vuk Belmužević and his spouse Olivera. He distinguished himself as Voivode of Despot Đurađ Branković in conflicts against the Republic of Venice. He was the last Voivode of Serbia in the crown land of Zeta.

During the reign of Despot Lazar Branković, Miloš Belmužević was the commander of Srebrenica, until the fall of the city into the hands of King Thomas of Bosnia, in 1458.

In 1464, he took refuge in the protected territory of Dubrovnik. After five years spent in Ston, he left for the Kingdom of Hungary in 1469. He quickly became the commander of the cavalry of the Hungarian king Matthias Corvinus. For his war merits, he received estates in Hungary, in the Nitra County (now Slovakia), whose headquarters were in Šaštin. For his help during the fight against the German Emperor Frederick III of Habsburg and the King of Poland, he received estates in the Temes County and the title of egregious. Miloš Belmužević received the estates again in 1483 in Majs and Poznad in the Timișoara County. In addition to those estates, he also had estates in Serbia, which was under Ottoman rule at the time. His estates in the Smederevo Sandzak are listed in the defter from 1476. Among them is the village of Jagodina with an income of 8,533 akca. Also, Belmužević took part further south in the Glogovac war as the commander of a detachment of Serbs in the Hungarian outfit in 1488, and on that occasion, he was wounded.

Thirteen years later, in his last fights in the Christian military frontier against the Ottomans in 1501, Miloš Belmužević was mortally injured and lost his one and only son, Vuk. He wrote a testament, in the presence of monk Timotija of Chilandar, where he passed his properties to his daughter Milica Belmužević, who was married to Stefan Jakšić. This document is the oldest known testament of Serbs in Hungary.

== Sources ==
- Isailović, Neven; Krstić, Aleksandar (2015). "Serbian Language and Cyrillic Script as a Means of Diplomatic Literacy in South Eastern Europe in 15th and 16th Centuries". Literacy Experiences concerning Medieval and Early Modern Transylvania. Cluj-Napoca: George Bariţiu Institute of History. pp. 185–195.
- Krstić, Aleksandar (2017). "Which Realm will You Opt for? – The Serbian Nobility Between the Ottomans and the Hungarians in the 15th Century". State and Society in the Balkans Before and After Establishment of Ottoman Rule. Belgrade: Institute of History; Yunus Emre Enstitüsü Turkish Cultural Centre. pp. 129–163. ISBN 9788677431259.
- Krstić, Aleksandar; Magina, Adrian (2021). "The Belmužević Family: The Fate of a Noble Family in South-East Europe During the Turbulent Period of the Ottoman Conquest (the 15th and First Half of the 16th Centuries)". Revue des études sud-est européennes. 59: 105–123.
- Magina, Adrian (2014). "Milica Belmužević: L'histoire d'une noble dame du XVIe siècle". Initial: A Review of Medieval Studies. 2: 145–162.
