= Alexandru Cornea =

Moldavian king

Prince of Moldavia
- Reign: December 1540 – February 1541
- Predecessor: Stephen V of Moldavia
- Successor: Petru Rareș
- Born: 1490
- Died: 5 March 1541 (aged 50–51)
- Issue: Alexandru; Ștefan
- Dynasty: Bogdan-Mușat
- Father: Bogdan III the One-Eyed
- Mother: Marguerite Asan Paléologue
- Religion: Orthodox

Stephen V Locust (r. 1538–1540) and Alexandru Cornea (r. 1540–1541) Alexandru Cornea (1490 – 5 March 1541), known as the Evil (Romanian: cel Rău) and scarcely numbered Alexandru III, was the Prince of Moldavia from 1540 to 1541, as son of a Bogdan III cel Chior from the House of Bogdan-Muşat. Stephen V Locust (r. 1538–40) and Alexandru Cornea ruled in the short interval between the two reignal periods of Petru Rareș (r. 1527–38 and 1541–1546).

Preceded by Ştefan V Lăcustă	Prince of Moldavia; 1540–1541	Succeeded by Petru IV Rareş
