= Stephen V of Moldavia =

Stephen V Locust

Prince of Moldavia
- Reign: 18 September 1538 – 20 December 1540
- Predecessor: Petru Rareș
- Successor: Alexandru Cornea
- Born: 1496; Suceava
- Died: 20 December 1540 (aged 43–44); Suceava
- Spouse: Cheajna
- Issue: ?
- Dynasty: Bogdan-Mușat
- Father: Alexandru of Moldavia (Sandrinos)
- Mother: Maria Asenina-Palailogina
- Religion: Orthodox

Stephen V Locust (Romanian: Ștefan V Lăcustă; 1496 – 20 December 1540) was Prince of Moldavia from 1538 to 1540. His nickname comes from a large locust invasion of the country that happened during his reign (most probably in 1539) and led to harvest loss, and famine.

Stephen was born after July 1496 in the capital city of Suceava, as the posthumous son of his father Alexandru of Moldavia, then the older son and heir of Stephen III the Great. His mother was Maria Asenina-Palaiologina a native Constantinopolitan of Byzantine imperial heritage. About 1–2 years after his birth due to succession for the throne ambitions by his step grandmother, Maria Voichița (3rd wife of Stephen III) who wanted to secure it to her son Bogdan-Vlad (future Bogdan III the One-Eyed), his mom takes him back to Constantinople where he will spend most part of his life before acceding to the throne at age 42. Based on his maternal origin and uprising in the Christian community of Constantinople as well as his direct nomination by the sultan he can be considered the first " Phanariote" -like ruler of Moldavia.

In the summer of 1538 he is appointed by sultan Suleiman the Magnificent as "Voievode & Hospodar" of Moldavia and he will participate in the campaign against his predecessor and uncle Petru IV Rareș. Petru was preparing to fight against overwhelming odds the sultan's army but he was deserted by most of his troops under the command of his grand boyars (nobles) the hetman (army commander) Mihul and logothete Trotusanul. Petru then flees in exile in Transylvania. Suleiman enters the city of Suceava, captures Moldavian treasury, battle flags and princely artifacts including Stephen IIIs sword and convokes formally the "Sfatul Tarii" (National Assembly) who sanctions unanimously his choice for the throne - Stephen V. As punishment for his predecessor's disobedience Suleiman also annexed the fortress of Tighina with surrounding area, a further territorial loss for Moldavia after prior conquest of Kilia and Cetatea Alba (Asprokastron) in 1484. This extended the country's vulnerability to attacks from South-West and caused discontent among the boyar elite and wider population. However otherwise the sultan renews Moldavia's autonomy and self rule and keeps unchanged the tribute at 10,000 gold coins annually.

His reign was noted mostly for the financial difficulties brought on by the locust invasion, but he appears to have made the best efforts to renew diplomatic relations with Hungary and Poland and, at the end of summer of 1540, took an increasing anti-Ottoman stance and even sanctioned a raid against Tighina which resulted in the death of about 150 Ottomans and confiscation per Polish contemporary accounts, of about 68,000 sheep.

In the meantime his ousted predecessor Petru IV Rareș after public supplication in front of the sultan and after having paid the biggest bribe yet for a Romanian prince is re-appointed in early December by Suleiman after he received the news of Moldavian raid against his subjects. Before Petru IV Rareș could reach Moldavia Stephen V is assassinated by a plot led by the same grand boyars - Mihul and Trotusanul five days before Christmas 1540. They will receive their punishment soon thereafter once Petru reached Suceava, although in between these two events there will be a 5-6 week rule by Alexandru Cornea, another grandson of Stephen III the Great. Stephen V is the first ruler of Moldavia assassinated by his boyars.

Stephen's V wife, Cheajna (whose origin and age we do not have information), was pardoned and she was allowed to retain quarters within the princely palace but she had passed months thereafter and was interred at the Bistrița Monastery where Stephen V himself might have been buried as well.

| Preceded by Petru IV Rareș | Prince of Moldavia; 1538–1540 | Succeeded by Alexandru III Cornea |
