= Petru Rareș =

Voivode of Moldavia

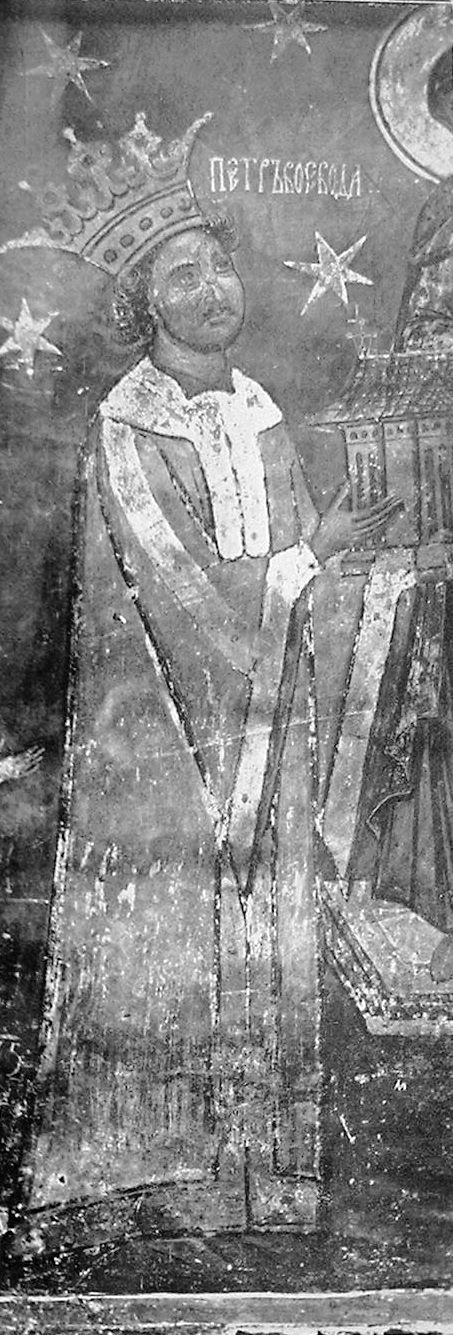

Prince of Moldavia (1st reign)
- Reign: 20 January 1527 – 18 September 1538
- Predecessor: Stephen IV of Moldavia
- Successor: Stephen V of Moldavia

Prince of Moldavia (2nd reign)
- Reign: 19 February 1541 – 3 September 1546
- Predecessor: Alexandru Cornea
- Successor: Ilie II Rareș
- Born: ca. 1483; Hârlău
- Died: 3 September 1546; Suceava
- Burial: Probota Monastery
- Spouse: Elena Ecaterina Rareș
- Dynasty: Bogdan-Mușat
- Father: Stephen the Great
- Mother: Maria Răreșoaia
- Religion: Orthodox

Petru Rareș (pronounced [ˈpetru ˈrareʃ]; c. 1483 – 3 September 1546) or Petru IV was twice voivode of Moldavia from 20 January 1527 to 18 September 1538 and from 19 February 1541 to 3 September 1546. He was an illegitimate child born (probably at Hârlău) to Stephen the Great. His mother was Maria Răreșoaia of Hârlău, whose existence is not historically documented but who is said to have been the wife of a wealthy boyar fish-merchant nicknamed Rareș "rare-haired" (i.e. bald). Rareș thus was not Petru's actual name but a nickname of his mother's husband.

In his youth he was a fish merchant, but Prince Ștefăniță, grandson of Ștefan cel Mare, on his deathbed, recommended Petru as a suitable contender to the throne, thus acknowledging Petru's blood lineage from Ștefan cel Mare.

Petru is said to have exhibited many of his father's qualities, such as ambition, daring, bravery, piety, artistic taste. However, he was marked by inconstancy and a lack of political instincts.

== First period of rule ==
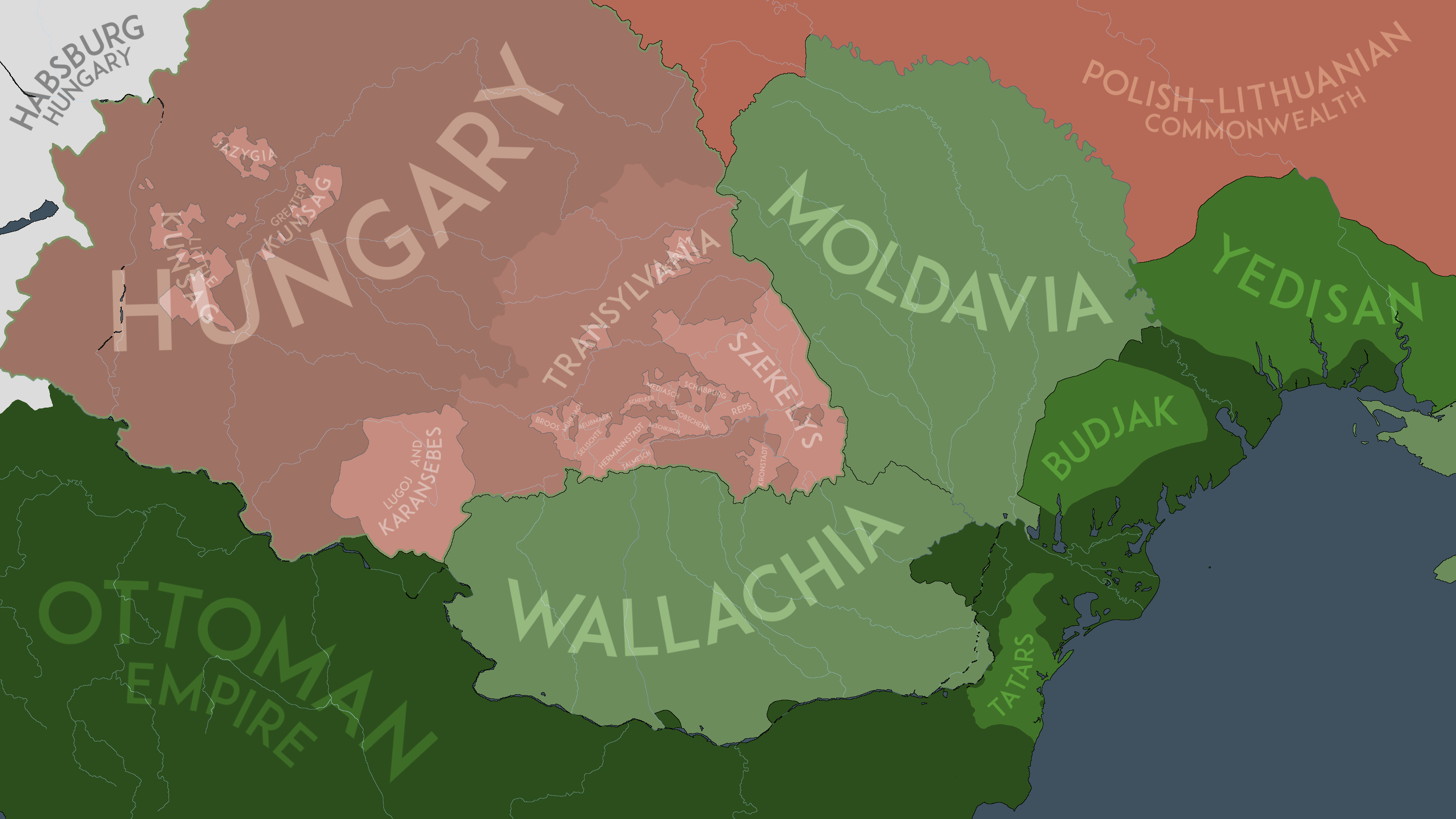
Moldavia in 1538, after Petru Rareș' failed uprising and the subsequent annexation of Tighina, Southern Bessarabia and Brăila as Ottoman raya

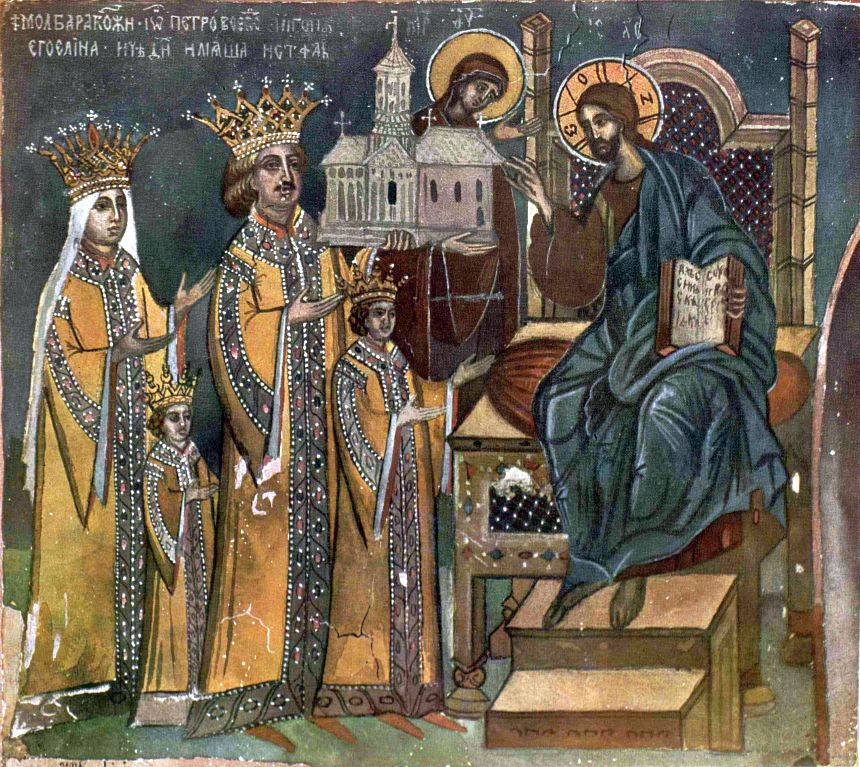
Petru Rareș (center) in a fresques from Moldovita Church

In the Hungarian battles between Ferdinand Habsburg and John Zápolya, he initially sided with Ferdinand, but when the Ottomans awarded recognition to Zápolya, he switched allegiances. In exchange for the citadel of Bistrița, he entered Transylvania on Zápolya's side and crushed Ferdinand at Feldioara on 22 June 1529. Zápolya then gave him Ungurașul but in spite of the efforts made Rareș was unable to occupy Bistrița. Neither could he subdue Brașov, which he besieged again in October for several weeks. Thus he was far from realizing his plan of ruling Transylvania. He had to content himself with Ciceu and Cetatea de Baltă, ruled by his father, and with the bishopric of Vad.

He then shifted his attention to Poland and in 1530 occupied Pokuttya. The Polish general Jan Tarnowski soon reconquered it, but when Petru re-entered Pokuttya, he was defeated by Tarnowski through superior tactics at Obertyn on 22 August 1531.

Events forced him to return to Transylvania. Here, the Ottomans had dispatched an Italian adventurer, Lodovico Gritti, to restore order. Transylvanian voievod István Majláth and the country's nobles forced Gritti to retreat behind the walls of Mediaș. Since Petru had received orders from the sultan to free Gritti, he sent his trusted vassal Huru to do the job. However, instead of helping Gritti, Huru lured him out and delivered him to his enemies, who killed him on the spot (1534). Rareș then killed Gritti's sons, who had entered Moldavia. The Ottomans could not retaliate at that point, being on campaign in Persia, so Petru was free to continue his intrigues between Ferdinand and Zápolya. The Poles tried in vain to have him replaced in 1538, appealing to the sultan to punish him. Then the over-zealous Petru, deserted by his own boyars, his capital Iași ablaze, and faced with a Turkish-Tatar-Polish army headed by Suleiman the Magnificent, who was bringing Ștefan Lăcustă to the throne, had to flee to his Transylvanian fortress of Ciceu.

The voivoda Petru raised his head in revolt, but my horse's hoofs ground him into the dust, and I conquered the land of Moldovia.

It is said that, during this flight, Rareș wandered for two weeks in the impassable forests of Transylvania, with difficulty making his way through spiny vegetation and ancient bushes and trees. Overcome by hunger, thirst, shock and despair, he was seen by a group of fishermen. Since he himself had been a fisherman, he was recognized and they sheltered and cared for him. Once he had recovered, his hosts garbed him in fishermen's clothes and showed him a shortcut to his fortress.

== Second period of rule ==
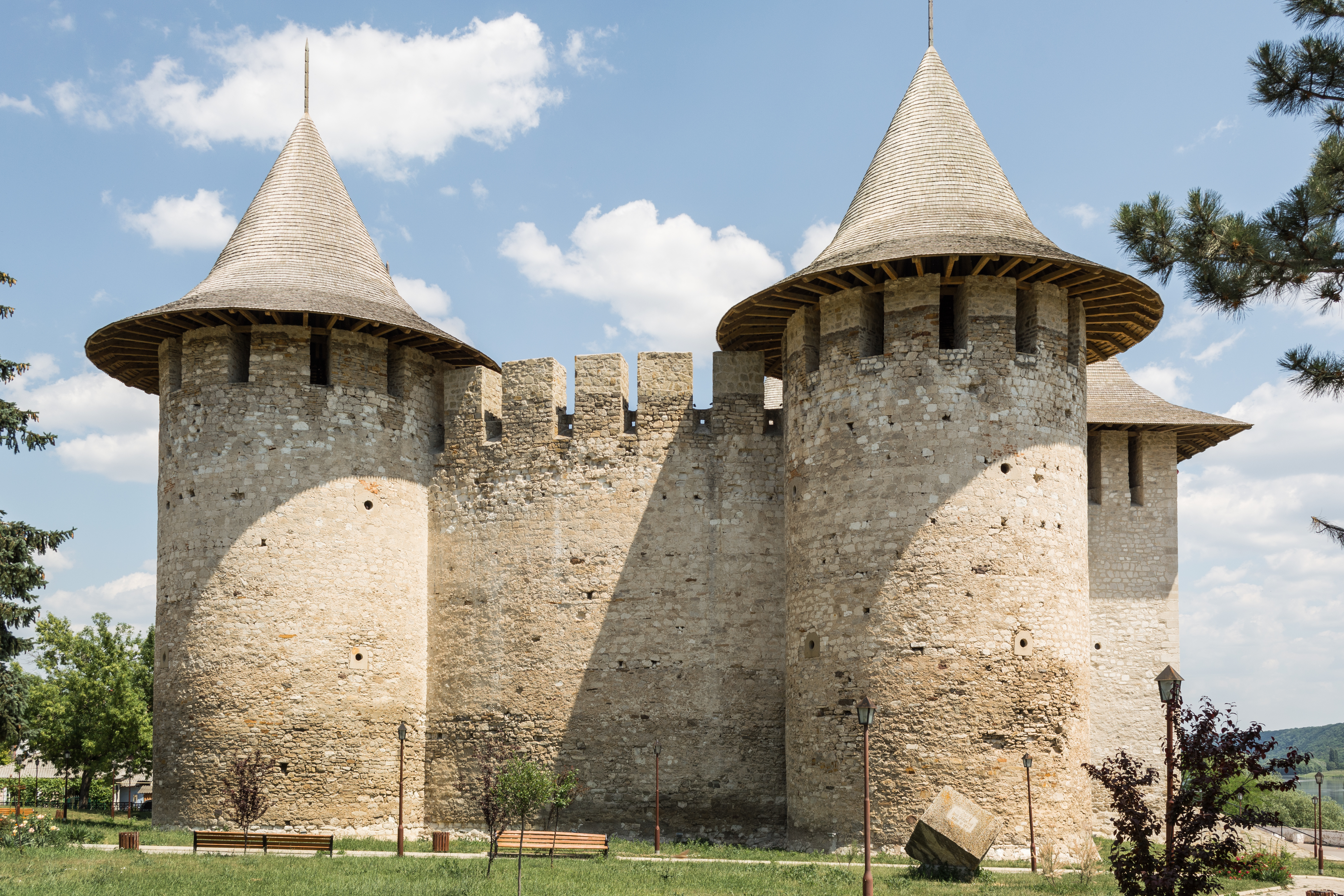
A fortress erected by Petru Rareș in Soroca.

It took over two years and various political changes in Transylvania and Moldavia before Petru was able to gain the sultan's forgiveness and regain the Moldavian throne in early 1541. Entering the country, he captured voievod Alexandru Cornea and his faithful boyars and killed them. Now, however, he was no longer trusted to wage wars, especially because he no longer retained his special links with Muntenia, his son-in-law Vlad VII Vintilă having been slain. Nor could he take back the Budjak, occupied by Sultan Suleiman, nor even the citadels of Ciceu and Cetatea de Baltă, except as simple fiefdoms (which he did in 1544), for their walls had been razed by George Martinuzzi.

In 1541, Rareș caught Transylvanian voievod István Majláth at Făgăraș, on the sultan's orders, and sent him to Constantinople. In 1542 he tried unsuccessfully to take Bistrița. Another failure was his enthusiastic involvement in plans for a crusade by Christian princes against the Ottomans. He lent the head of the proposed crusade, Joachim II of Brandenburg, 200,000 florins, but the initiative was abandoned when Buda was besieged in 1542 and Rareș died, still a Turkish vassal, on 3 September 1546. He is buried in the monastery that he endowed, Probota Monastery.

On the ecclesiastical and artistic front, he continued the tradition inherited from Stephen the Great. Aided by his wife Jelena, he built and repaired numerous churches, including in Baia, Botoșani, Hârlău, Târgu Frumos and Roman. His most beautiful achievement is considered to be Probota Monastery.

== Children ==
- With Maria, killed 28 June 1529:
  - Bogdan (d. 3 September 1534)
  - Ana (d. 1545), wife of Wallachian prince Vlad VI Înecatul
- With Serbian princess Jelena Branković (ca. 1502–1552 (strangled)), daughter of despot Jovan Branković, married to Rareș in 1530:
  - Chiajna (ca. 1525–1588, Constantinople), wife of Wallachian prince Mircea V Ciobanul
  - Maria (1536-1614) wife of boyar Radu Balică, then of Ioan Movilă of Hudești, whom she bore the princes of Wallachia and of Moldavia, respectively Ieremia Movilă and Simion I Movilă
  - Ilie II Rareș, (b. 1531), prince of Moldavia
  - Ștefan VI Rareș (b. 1532), prince of Moldavia
  - Constantin (1542 – 26 March 1554, Constantinople)
  - Ruxandra (d. 1570), wife of Moldavian prince Alexandru IV Lăpușneanu
- With the Saxon Ecatarina of Kronstadt (illegitimate issue):
  - Iancu Sasul, prince of Moldavia
- With an unknown woman (illegitimate issue):
  - Bogdan Constantin (d. 1573), pretender to the Moldavian throne

Preceded by Ștefăniță	Prince/Voivode of Moldavia; 1527–1538	Succeeded by Ștefan Lăcustă
Preceded by Alexandru Cornea	Prince/Voivode of Moldavia; 1541–1546	Succeeded by Ilie II Rareș

== See also ==
- List of rulers of Moldavia

== Bibliography ==
- Constantinescu, Radu (1978). Moldova și Transilvania în vremea lui Petru Rareș: Relații politice și militare (1527-1546). București: Direcția Generală a Arhivelor Statului.
- Denize, Eugen (1995). Țările române și Veneția: Relațiile politice (1441–1541): De la Iancu de Hunedoara la Petru Rareș. București: Editura Albatros. ISBN 978-973-24-0368-6.
- Gorovei, Ștefan (1982). Petru Rareș 1527-1538, 1541–1546. București: Editura militară.
- Șimanschi, Leon, ed. (1978). Petru Rareș. București: Editura Academiei.
- Ursu, Ion (1908). Die auswärtige Politik des Peter Rareș, Fürst von Moldau (1527-1538). Wien: Konegen.
