= Jakšić family =

Serbian noble family

Jakšić Јакшић Jaksics
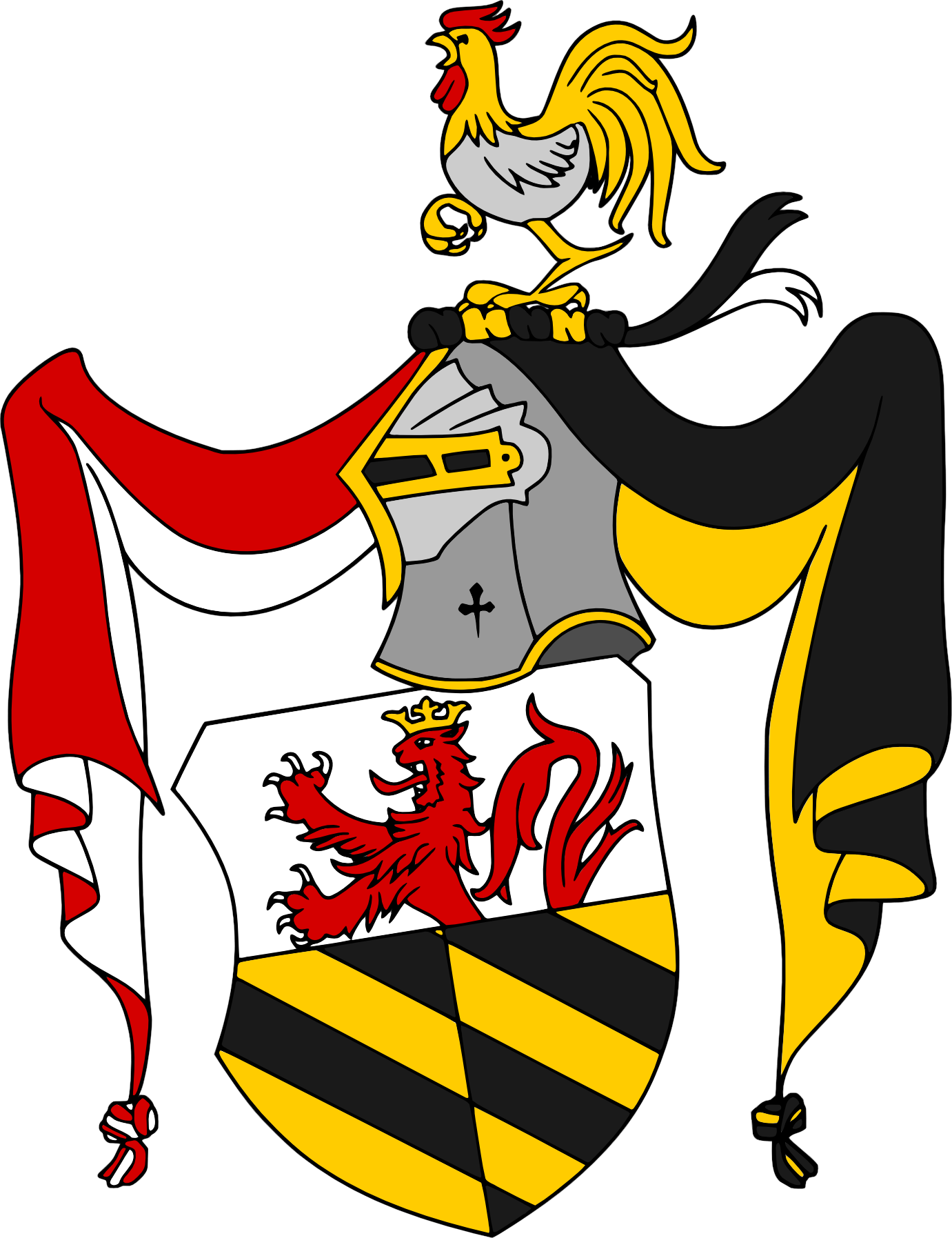
- Country: Serbian Despotate; Kingdom of Hungary
- Founded: before 1453
- Titles: voivode
- Estate: Nădlac
- Dissolution: after 1543

The House of Jakšić (Serbian Cyrillic: Јакшић, pl. Јакшићи / Jakšići; Hungarian: Jaksics család) was a prominent Serbian noble family from the 15th and 16th century, in the Serbian Despotate and the Kingdom of Hungary. The eponymous founder, Jakša, was a Voivode (Duke) in the service of Serbian Despot Đurađ Branković, and after the fall of Serbia to the Ottomans (1459) his descendants joined the ranks of the Hungarian army, and gained prominence in wars against the Ottoman Empire. Hungarian King Matthias Corvinus granted them possessions in various counties, from Nădlac, to Syrmia and Valkó. The male line of the family died out in 1543.

== History ==
=== Jakša ===
Jakša Brežičić was a voivode in the Serbian Despotate, under Despot Đurađ Branković. Jakša was mentioned in 1452 as Đurađ's envoy in the Republic of Ragusa. As an Ottoman vassal, Đurađ was forced to send an army to participate in the siege of Constantinople in 1453. Sultan Mehmed the Conqueror did not tell Đurađ his intentions, but said that the cavalry would travel to Karaman. The sultan's forces harassed civilians on their way to Constantinople. Jakša objected to Mehmed, who did not hold back in his threats to Jakša. Jakša reached the fallen Constantinople, the center of the world of Orthodox Christianity, with its last ruler Constantine XI Palaiologos perishing together with the Byzantine Empire. The event is recorded in the writings of Konstantin Mihailović, who was in Jakša's army.

=== Jakšić brothers ===
Stefan and Dmitar Jakšić, the sons of Jakša (hence Jakšići), left Jagodina with 1200 warriors for Hungary. They were hospitably received by Matthias Corvinus, who gave them Nădlac (Nagylak) and estates around Moriš, to rule as vassals in 1464. The operations of the Serbian nobility in Slovakia against Germany and Poland in the second half of the 15th century, were hugely successful and as such were lavishly celebrated. Dmitar held dozens of settlements of Pomorišje, and with his cavalry detachment hidden in the woods, and great skill and courage, he led victories against the Polish armies at Humenné and Michalovce in 1473. Dmitar was the general of King Matthias in a battle of Košice in 1474, of which he has been celebrated of in Serbian epic poetry. In 1476, Dmitar took part in the battle of Pančevo, alongside Despot Vuk Grgurević. In 1479, Dmitar participated in the Battle of Breadfield with some 900 Serbs, the outcome was a decisive Hungarian victory. Dmitar is remembered as one of the most distinguished generals of the Black Army of Hungary, which was primarily composed of Bohemians and Serbs. The brothers had risen in the ranks of barons through their military service, as did Vuk, Ladislaus Egervari, Paul Kinizsi and many more.

Stefan is remembered for his victory in a duel against a Polish swashbuckler that resulted in the withdrawal of the Polish army in 1490. The next year, in December 1491, another battle is fought at Košice between Polish King John I Albert and Hungarian King Vladislaus II. The Hungarian victory was largely due to the Serbian warriors led by Miloš Velmužević and the Jakšić brothers.

Despot Vuk, Dmitar Jakšić, and his son Jovan Jakšić took part in the campaign of King Matthias against the Turks in 1481, when the Christian army arrived at Kruševac. Jovan's detachment liberated Golubac. With the retreat from Serbia, some 110,000 Serbs joined up, settling in the vicinity of Timișoara. Dmitar, on his way back from Turkey as a deputy of the King at the Sultan's court, was attacked and seriously wounded near Smederevo. He died from his wounds on November 8, 1486, while his brother Stefan died in 1489.

=== Last generation ===
In May 1514, an uprising was instigated by György Dózsa against the Landed nobility. The uprising spread over a great part of south Hungary, over Banat, Bačka to Syrmia. It affected a part of Serbs, the properties of the Jakšić brothers in Nădlac were destroyed and a part of the former Despot's. The greater part of Hungarian Serbs aided the royalty and nobility against the kurucs. Marko Jakšić, the son of Stefan, took part in the Battle of Mohács in 1526.

The last nobility as ktetors of Hilandar, were the Jakšići. Despotissa Angelina Branković asked Vasili III for help to Hilandar. The Hilandar clerics had in the mid 16th century asked Emperor Ivan IV for protection and material aid. Ivan the Terrible became the new ktetor of Hilandar. He was the great-grandson of Stefan Jakšić. The last Jakšić nobleman died in 1543.

== Serbian epic poetry ==
Post-Kosovo cycle.

- Dioba Jakšića
- Dioba Jakšića (iz Crne Gore)
- Jakšići kušaju svoje ljube
- Jakšićima dvori poharani
- Ženidba Jakšića Mitra (iz Sinja)
- Ženidba Jakšića Mitra (iz Srema)
- Ženidba Teodora Jakšića
- Ropstvo i Ženidba Jakšića Šćepana
- Dva Jakšića i sestra im Jela

== Genealogy ==
- Jakša Brežičić, voivode of Despot Đurađ Branković.
  - Stefan Jakšić (?-1489), married Milica Belmužević (fl. 1506)
    - Dmitar Jakšić, died young.
    - Stefan Jakšić (?-1520)
    - Marko Jakšić (?-1537), married Polyxena of Moldavia
      - Stefan Jakšić,
      - Jovana Jakšić, married to Mihailo Bakić (1536)
      - Jelisaveta Jakšić, married Miklós Dóczy de Dóc (Dóczy Miklós).
      - Marija Jakšić, married Kelemen Ártándy de Ártánd (Ártándy Kelemen)
      - Milica (Potencija) Jakšić, married János Kendeffy.
      - Margita Jakšić, married Boldizsár Patócsi.
      - Sholastika Jakšić, married Domokos Dobó de Ruszka, then László Kamarás de Zelemér.
      - Ana Jakšić, married Gáspár Bánffy de Losonc, then Antal Kendy.
    - Ana Jakšić, married Vasili Lvovich Glinsky
      - Elena Glinskaya, married Vasili III Ivanovich
        - Ivan the Terrible, Grand Prince of Moscow 1547–1584
    - Jelena Jakšić, married Despot Jovan Branković, then Despot Jovan Berislavić
    - Irina Jakšić, married Matija Hercegović Kosača, titular Duke of Saint Sava
  - Dmitar Jakšić (?-1486), married Jelena Branković
    - Jovan Jakšić
    - Dmitar Jakšić (?-1510)
    - Petar Jakšić, married Katarina Csáki (Csáki Katalin).
      - Dmitar Jakšić (?-1539)
      - Nikola Jakšić (?-1539)
      - Jovan Jakšić (?-1543)
    - Đorđe Jakšić

== Sources ==
- Bataković, Dušan T., ed. (2005). Histoire du peuple serbe [History of the Serbian People] (in French). Lausanne: L’Age d’Homme. ISBN 9782825119587.
- Ćirković, Sima (2004). The Serbs. Malden: Blackwell Publishing. ISBN 9781405142915.
- Fine, John Van Antwerp Jr. (1994) [1987]. The Late Medieval Balkans: A Critical Survey from the Late Twelfth Century to the Ottoman Conquest. Ann Arbor, Michigan: University of Michigan Press. ISBN 0472082604.
- Gavrilović, Slavko (1993). "Serbs in Hungary, Slavonia and Croatia in struggles against the Turks (15th-18th centuries)". Serbs in European Civilization. Belgrade: Nova, Serbian Academy of Sciences and Arts, Institute for Balkan Studies. pp. 41–54. ISBN 9788675830153.
- Isailović, Neven G.; Krstić, Aleksandar R. (2015). "Serbian Language and Cyrillic Script as a Means of Diplomatic Literacy in South Eastern Europe in 15th and 16th Centuries". Literacy Experiences concerning Medieval and Early Modern Transylvania. Cluj-Napoca: George Bariţiu Institute of History. pp. 185–195.
- Krstić, Aleksandar R. (2017). "Which Realm will You Opt for? – The Serbian Nobility Between the Ottomans and the Hungarians in the 15th Century". State and Society in the Balkans Before and After Establishment of Ottoman Rule. Belgrade: Institute of History, Yunus Emre Enstitüsü Turkish Cultural Centre. pp. 129–163. ISBN 9788677431259.
- Leber, Taisiya (2019). "Milica Jakšić's Charter for Hilandar Monastery (1506)". Initial: A Review of Medieval Studies. 7: 115–138.
- Magina, Adrian (2014). "Milica Belmužević: L`histoire d`une noble dame du XVIe siècle". Initial: A Review of Medieval Studies. 2: 145–162.
- Magina, Adrian (2018). "Acta Jakšićiana: Documents Regarding the Jakšić of Nădlac Family in Romanian Archives" (PDF). Initial: A Review of Medieval Studies. 6: 159–188.
- Spremić, Momčilo (2004). "La famille serbe des Branković - considérations généalogiques et héraldiques" (PDF). Зборник радова Византолошког института (in French). 41: 441–452.
- Stojkovski, Boris; Ivanić, Ivana; Spăriosu, Laura (2018). "Serbian-Romanian Relations in the Middle Ages until the Ottoman Conquest" (PDF). Transylvanian Review. 27 (2): 217–229. Archived from the original (PDF) on 2022-01-21.
- Živanović, Đorđe (1959), "Живот Константина Михаиловића", Константин Михаиловић из Островице, Projekat Rastko – Poljska
