= Jakša Brežičić =

Serbian military leader

- Military career
- Allegiance: Serbian Despotate
- Service years: 1440-1453
- Rank: vojvoda
- Unit: Cavalry

Jakša (Serbian Cyrillic: Јакша; fl. 1452–53), was a military commander (vojvoda) in the service of Serbian Despot Đurađ Branković (r. 1427–56). Jakša is the eponymous founder of the Jakšić noble family

In 1452, he was sent as a deputy of the Despot to the Republic of Ragusa. As an Ottoman vassal, Đurađ was forced to send 500 cavalry to participate in the Siege of Constantinople (1453). Sultan Mehmed II did not tell Đurađ of his intentions, but notified Đurađ that Jakša's cavalry squadron would travel to Karaman.

The sultan slaughtered civilians on his way to Constantinople, which he quickly besieged. Jakša, hearing of this, wanted to return but was warned that if they would not continue, the sultan would destroy the Serbs. Jakša reached Constantinople, which had been the cradle of Eastern Christianity and culture, serving as the capital of the now destroyed Byzantine Empire. Janissary Konstantin Mihailović was part of this army; he wrote a memoir in which he mentioned these events. He had two sons, Stefan and Dmitar, who became highly respected noblemen in Kingdom of Hungary.

== Annotations ==
1. His given name was Jakša. His surname is rendered as either Brežičić or Berščić.
