= Bogdan III the One-Eyed =

Voivode of Moldavia from 1504 to 1517

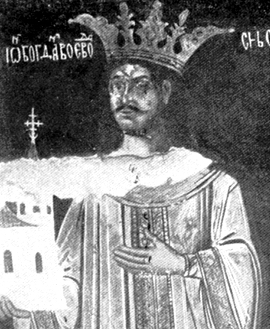
- Bogdan III the One-Eyed, Saint Nicholas Princely Church

Prince of Moldavia
- Reign: 2 July 1504 – 20 April 1517
- Predecessor: Stephen the Great
- Successor: Stephen IV of Moldavia
- Born: March 18, 1479; Huși, Principality of Moldavia
- Died: April 20, 1517 (aged 38); Huși, Principality of Moldavia
- Burial: Putna Monastery
- Spouse: Doamna Stana; Doamna Nastasia; Doamna Ruxandra of Wallachia
- Issue: Alexandru Cornea; Alexandru Lăpușneanu; Stephen IV of Moldavia
- Dynasty: Mușat
- Father: Stephen the Great
- Mother: Doamna Maria Voichița of Wallachia
- Religion: Orthodox Christianity

Bogdan III the One-Eyed (Romanian: Bogdan al III-lea cel Chior) or Bogdan III the Blind (Bogdan al III-lea cel Orb; 18 March 1479 – 20 April 1517) was Voivode of Moldavia from July 2, 1504, to 1517.

== Family ==
Bogdan was born in Huși as the son of Voivode Stephen III (Stephen the Great) and his wife Maria Voichița. He was his father's only surviving legitimate son.

== Conflicts ==
=== War with Poland ===
Immediately after Bogdan came to the throne, he expressed his intent to marry Elisabeth, sister of Polish King Alexander the Jagiellonian. After being twice refused despite offering generous gifts (including territorial concessions), he raided southern Poland, and Alexander accepted his demands—provided that Bogdan be more lenient towards the status of the Roman Catholic Church in Moldavia—in 1506. Alexander's death and Sigismund the Old's ascendancy led to a breaking of the previous agreement, provoking further incursions on each side. In October 1509, Bogdan was severely defeated on the Dniester river; a peace was signed on January 17, 1510, when the ruler finally renounced his pretensions.

=== War with Wallachia ===
In July 1506, pretender Roman Pribeagu ("Trifăilă") raided southwest Moldavia with Wallachian support. Bogdan responded with retaliatory raids into Wallachia, before the conflict was temporarily resolved through a peace treaty on 28 November. The conflict was restarted in March 1512 and lasted till April, during which Moldavians sacked a major trading hub of Brăila. On 27 February 1514, Bogdan defeated a combined Wallachian-Transylvanian army and beheaded the pretender, consolidating his rule.

=== Tatar incursions ===
In 1510, Moldavia suffered two major Tatar devastations (they are alleged to have carried away 74,000 as slaves)—in 1511, the Tatars even managed to occupy most of the country. The events forced Poland, still recovering from the great invasion of 1506, to send troops as aid, helping Bogdan regain his lands after a victory in May 1512.

== Submission to Ottoman rule ==
In 1514, in order to block the Tatar threat by enlisting the help of a powerful overlord, Bogdan sent chancellor Tăutu to negotiate the terms of Moldavia's submission to the Ottoman Empire (then under the rule of Yavuz Sultan Selim, or Selim I).

The Porte demanded that a certain sum (initially expressed as 4,000 gold coins) be paid yearly, together with a ceremonial gift of 40 horses and 40 falcons, additional expenses (such as for the celebration of Eid ul-Fitr) and assistance in case of war—Princes themselves were required to lead a 4,000-strong army that would place itself under the orders of the Sultan. In exchange for these, Moldavia was allowed a high level of autonomy.

== Life ==
Bogdan was blind in one eye, most likely after a wound received during one of his many battles. While the rules of succession to the throne did exclude an impaired individual, as însemnat ("marked"), they seem to have applied just to people who had been affected before their candidacy to the throne, and to those with congenital disorders.

He was married to Stana, Nastasia and finally to Ruxandra, daughter of Mihnea cel Rău, ruling Prince of Wallachia. He had no legitimate children.

He was buried next to his father (and other members of his family) in Putna Monastery.

== See also ==
Ancestors of Bogdan III the One-Eyed

8. Alexander I of Moldavia
4. Bogdan II of Moldavia
9. Ana Neacşa
2. Stephen III of Moldavia
5. Oltea
1. Bogdan III the One-Eyed
12. Vlad II Dracul
6. Radu cel Frumos
13. Cneajna of Moldavia
3. Maria Voichița

Preceded by Stephen the Great	Voivode of Moldavia; 1504–1517	Succeeded by Ştefan IV
