= Bogdan II of Moldavia =

Bogdan II
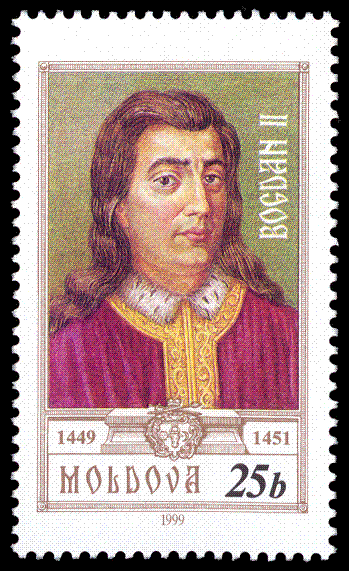

Prince of Moldavia
- Reign: 12 October 1449 – 17 October 1451
- Predecessor: Alexăndrel of Moldavia
- Successor: Peter Aaron
- Born: 1409
- Died: 17 October 1451 (aged 41–42); Reuseni
- Spouse: Doamna (Maria) Oltea
- Issue: Stephen III the Great
- Dynasty: Bogdan-Mușat
- Father: Alexander the Good/Roman I of Moldavia
- Mother: Unknown
- Religion: Orthodox

Bogdan II (1409 – 17 October 1451) was a prince of Moldavia from October 12, 1449, to October 17, 1451.

== Family ==
According to some historians, he was the bastard of Alexander the Good, by an unknown mother. On the contrary, according to the others, he was the brother of Alexander the Good and son of Roman I of Moldavia. Bogdan II was the father of the Stephen the Great. He had a very good relationship with Iancu de Hunedoara, who supported his accession to the throne. He was married to Doamna Oltea (Lady Oltea), who became a nun under the name of Maria. She died on November 4, 1465, and was buried at the Probota Monastery of Suceava County.

Preceded by Alexăndrel	Prince/Voivode of Moldavia; 1449–1451	Succeeded by Petru Aron

== See also ==
Ancestors of Bogdan II of Moldavia

8. Costea of Moldavia
4. Roman I of Moldavia
2. Alexander I of Moldavia
5. Margareta Muşata
1. Bogdan II of Moldavia
3. Unknown
