= 1448 =

1448 in various calendars
- Gregorian calendar: 1448; MCDXLVIII
- Ab urbe condita: 2201
- Armenian calendar: 897; ԹՎ ՊՂԷ
- Assyrian calendar: 6198
- Balinese saka calendar: 1369–1370
- Bengali calendar: 854–855
- Berber calendar: 2398
- English Regnal year: 26 Hen. 6 – 27 Hen. 6
- Buddhist calendar: 1992
- Burmese calendar: 810
- Byzantine calendar: 6956–6957
- Chinese calendar: 丁卯年 (Fire Rabbit); 4145 or 3938 — to — 戊辰年 (Earth Dragon); 4146 or 3939
- Coptic calendar: 1164–1165
- Discordian calendar: 2614
- Ethiopian calendar: 1440–1441
- Hebrew calendar: 5208–5209
- Hindu calendars
- Vikram Samvat: 1504–1505
- Shaka Samvat: 1369–1370
- Kali Yuga: 4548–4549
- Holocene calendar: 11448
- Igbo calendar: 448–449
- Iranian calendar: 826–827
- Islamic calendar: 851–852
- Japanese calendar: Bun'an 5 (文安５年)
- Javanese calendar: 1363–1364
- Julian calendar: 1448; MCDXLVIII
- Korean calendar: 3781
- Minguo calendar: 464 before ROC 民前464年
- Nanakshahi calendar: −20
- Thai solar calendar: 1990–1991
- Tibetan calendar: མེ་མོ་ཡོས་ལོ་ (female Fire-Hare); 1574 or 1193 or 421 — to — ས་ཕོ་འབྲུག་ལོ་ (male Earth-Dragon); 1575 or 1194 or 422

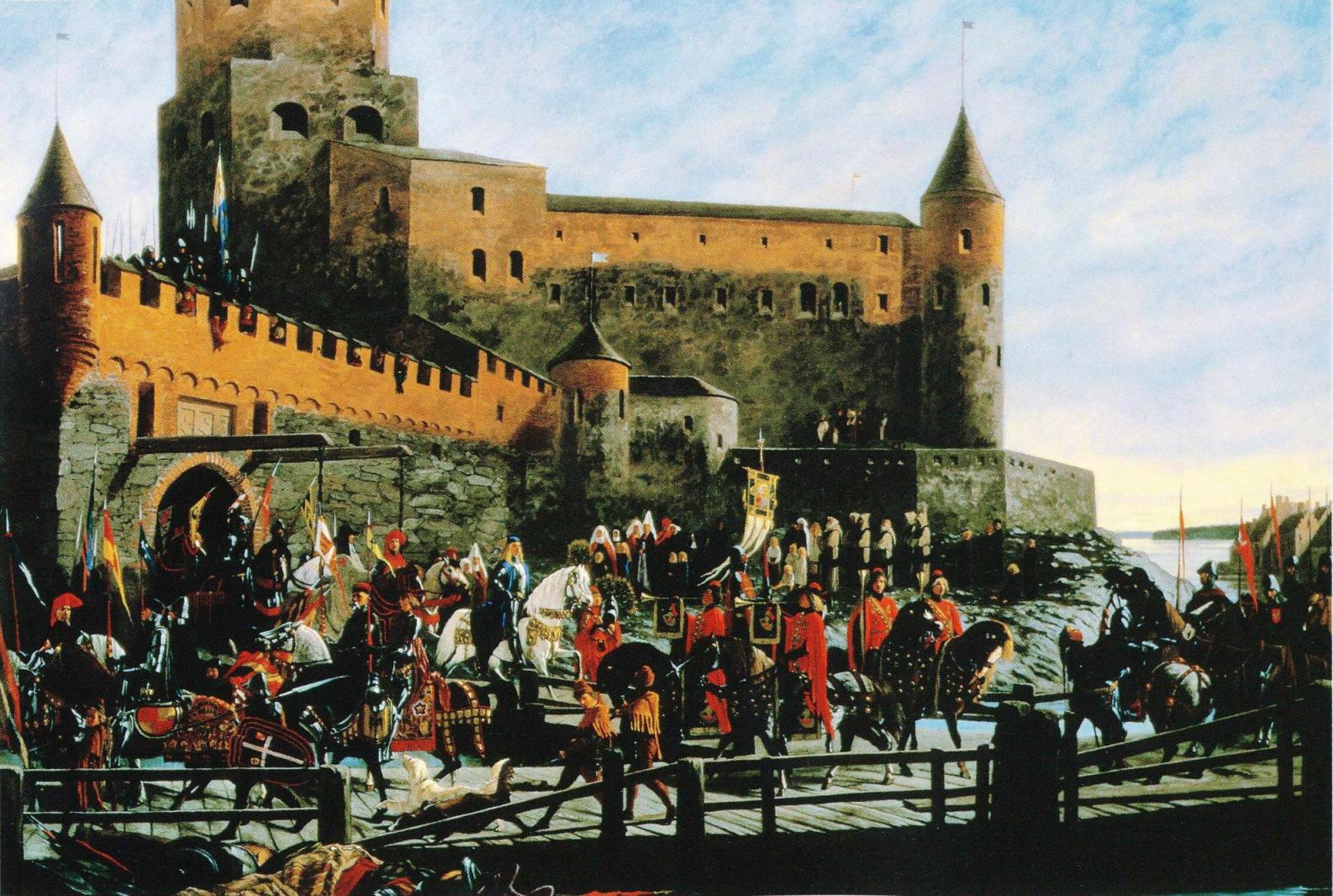
June 20: Karl Knuttson is elected by nobles to be King of Sweden.

Year 1448 (MCDXLVIII) was a leap year starting on Monday of the Julian calendar.

== Events ==
=== January–March ===
- January 6 – Christopher of Bavaria, King of Denmark, Norway and Sweden, dies at his palace, the Kärnan, in Helsingborg (now in Sweden) with no designated heir, leaving all three kingdoms with vacant thrones. Brothers Bengt Jönsson Oxenstierna and Nils Jönsson Oxenstierna are selected to serve as co-regents of Sweden.
- February 17 – The Concordat of Vienna is signed between the Holy Roman Empire (represented by the Emperor Frederick III and the Holy See.
- February 23 – Petru III becomes Prince of Moldavia for a third time when Prince Roman II dies.
- March 4 – The Republic of Venice offers a reward to anyone who is successful in assassinating the Albanian rebel leader Skanderbeg, with a pension of 100 gold ducats per month as a reward.
- March 16 – The English garrison at Le Mans in France surrenders to the French Army.
- March 19 – The Battle of Río Verde is fought as the 600-member cavalry of the Crown of Castile, is retreating from an attack led by Juan de Saavedra, against invaders from the Emirate of Granada, led by the Sultan Yusuf V. The 1,500 Granadan cavalry overwhelm the Castilians and massacre all but five of the 600 soldiers, while taking Saavedra as a prisoner of war.

=== April–June ===
- April 15 – Queens' College, Cambridge is founded by Margaret of Anjou.
- April 28 – The militia of francs-archers, the first regular infantry in France, is created by the ordonnance of Montil-lès-Tours during the reign of King Charles VII, directing that in each parish, the person most skilled in the use of archery would be exempt from certain obligations in return for perfecting his skills on a weekly basis and being ready to be summoned for combat.
- May 3 – The Treaty of Prenzlau is signed between in Germany by the Margraviate of Brandenburg and the Duchy of Pomerania, both principalities within the Holy Roman Empire. The treaty partitions the disputed territory of the Uckermark, with Brandenburg receiving the southern part and Pomerania the northern part, with rights for Brandenburg to receive the north if Pomerania's ruling house should become extinct.
- May 14 – The Siege of Svetigrad is started by the Ottoman Sultan Murad II against an Albanian fortress at Svetigrad, now Kodžadžik in North Macedonia. After two and a half months, the siege is successful in capturing the fortress.
- May 24 – Under an agreement with the Holy Roman Emperor, Friedrich III, the city council of Basel in Switzerland votes to expel all persons attending the Council of Basel, a group of clerics opposed to the Roman Catholic Pope.
- June 9 – The regency of Portugal ends as Dom Pedro, Duke of Coimbra, as King Afonso V, now 16, dismisses his uncle who had served as regent for almost 10 years after the death of King Duarte in 1738. Influenced by Afonso de Braganza, King Afonso begins nullification of all of the decrees made in his name by Dom Pedro.
- June 20 – The Regency period of Sweden ends with the election by Swedish nobles of Karl Knutsson Bonde as King Karl VIII.
- June 27 – Venice sends Andrea Venier to negotiate with the Ottoman Empire in an attempt to have the Ottomans invade Albania. Afterwards, Venier is sent to meet with Skanderbeg to ask him to cease hostilities.
- June 29 – Karl VIII is crowned as King of Sweden in Uppsala Cathedral the day after being publicly hailed as king at Mora Stones.

=== July–September ===
- July 2 – Catherine Karlsdotter, daughter of Karl Ormsson Gumsehuvud and wife of King Karl VIII of Sweden, is crowned as Queen consort of Sweden.
- July 23 – The League of Lezhë, made up of the armies of various Albanian principalities, defeats the forces of the Venetian Republic and the Ottoman Empire at the battle of Scutari.
- July 25 – The Council of Basel, opposed to the Pope at Rome, moves to Lausanne and holds its first session, presided over by the antipope Felix V.
- July 29 – The War in Gotland begins in Scandinavia as an army from Sweden, commanded by Generals Magnus Gren and Birger Trolle, invades the island of Gotland, at the time ruled by Denmark. The invasion is repelled by Erik of Pomerania, ruler of the island and the former King of Sweden and Denmark.
- July 31 – The Siege of Svetigrad ends after 10 weeks as the defenders surrender to the Ottomans. The reason for giving up is the lack of a safe water supply, either because it was contaminated from a dead animal in the castle well, or because the Ottomans were able to locate and cut off the castles source of water.
- August 14 – At the Battle of Oranik, Albanian forces led by Skanderbeg defeat the armies of the Republic of Venice and the Ottoman Empire.
- September 1 – After his betrothal to Dorothea of Brandenburg, Queen Dowager and widow of King Christoffer III (who died in January), German Count Christian of Oldenburg, is elected by the Danish nobility to become the new monarch, King Christian I of Denmark.
- September 3 – Prince George of Poděbrady, leader of the Hussites in Bohemia (now the Czech Republic) captures Prague after leading 9,000 of his troops from Kutná Hora.
- September 15 – At the Battle of Caravaggio, the armies of the Ambrosian Republic of Milan, led by Francesco Sforza, defeat those of the Republic of Venice, commanded by Micheletto Attendolo.
- September 16 – General Thomas Kantakouzenos of the Serbian Despotate recaptures Srebrenica and Višegrad from the Kingdom of Bosnia. led by King Stephen Thomas of Bosnia.
- September 30 – Leonardo III Tocco becomes the new ruler of Epirus upon the death of his father Carlo II Tocco.

=== October–December ===
- October 4 – Peace between Albania and Venice is established, bringing an end to the Albanian–Venetian War.
- October 10 – The Hungarian commander Ciubăr Vodă briefly becomes Prince of Moldavia after the death of Petru III, and governs until Alexăndrel of Moldavia takes the throne in December.
- October 20 – After three days of fighting at the Battle of Kosovo, Hungarian forces under John Hunyadi are defeated by the larger Ottoman force commanded by the Sultan Murad II
- October – Vlad the Impaler becomes reigning Prince of Wallachia for two months, before being deposed in November by Vladislav II of Wallachia.
- November 1 - On the day that had been scheduled for England to transfer its territory in France at Le Mans, Maine and Anjou back to French control, English diplomats Nicholas Molyneux, Osbert Mundford and Thomas Direhill meet at Le Mans with the French representatives Guilaume Cousinot II and Jean Havart. However, Fulk Eyton and Sir Matthew Gough, who had been empowered by King Henry VI of England to make the transfer, deliberately avoid attending and the English commissioners declare that no transfer will be made until just compensation will be made to Englishmen who are losing their land. Cousinot and Havart renew their demands for transfer to take place as scheduled and nothing is accomplished.
- November - In Vietnam, a rebellion led by chieftains in Tuyên Quang against King Lê Nhân Tông of the Lê dynasty was defeated.
- December 4 – Swedish troops attack Gotland again and climb the walls of the city's capital, Visby, making a surprise attack. Eric of Pomerania flees to the fortress of Visborg.
- December 15 – Jonas, a Russian bishop, is installed by the Council of Russian Bishops in Moscow, as Metropolitan of Kiev and All Rus. The event marks the independence of the Russian Orthodox Church because the election of Jonas is made without the approval of the Ecumenical Patriarchate of Constantinople as this is without the consent of the Patriarch of Constantinople, it signifies the beginning of an effectively independent church structure in the Grand Duchy of Moscow.
- December 20 – Pope Nicholas V appoints Rudolf of Diepholt, Bishop of Utrecht, as cardinal.

=== Date unknown ===
- Roman II flees to Poland, when an army sent by John Hunyadi, and led by Csupor de Monoszló, comes to put Petru III on the throne of Moldavia. Petru dies suddenly, and Csupor takes on the throne for two months, as Ciubăr Vodă.
- After a long episode of drought, flood, locust infestation and famine in Ming dynasty China since the year 1434, these natural afflictions finally wane, and agriculture and commerce return to a state of normality.
- The Vatican Library is founded by Pope Nicholas V.
- Scottish army, led by Hugh Douglas, Earl of Ormond, was victorious against the English Army in the Battle of Sark.

== Births ==
- February 14 – Nannina de' Medici, Florentine member of the de' Medici family (d. 1493)
- March 20 – Marie of Savoy, Countess of Saint-Pol, Luxembourgish noble (d. 1475)
- July 14 – Philip, Elector Palatine (d. 1508)
- September 7 – Henry, Count of Württemberg-Montbéliard (1473–1482) (d. 1519)
- October 31 – Władysław II of Płock, Polish noble (d. 1462)
- November 4 – King Alphonso II of Naples (d. 1495)
- December 12 – John Talbot, 3rd Earl of Shrewsbury, English Earl (d. 1473)
- date unknown
  - Baeda Maryam of Ethiopia (d. 1478)
  - Nicholas I, Duke of Lorraine (d. 1473)
  - Suor Barbara Ragnoni, Italian painter (d. 1533)

== Deaths ==
- January 6 – Christopher of Bavaria, King of Denmark, Norway and Sweden (b. 1418)
- June 18 – Elizabeth de Beauchamp, Baroness Bergavenny, English baroness (b. 1415)
- September 23 – Adolph I, Duke of Cleves (b. 1373)
- October – Carlo II Tocco, ruler of Epirus
- October 12 – Zhu Quan, Prince of Ning, Chinese military commander, historian and playwright (b. 1378)
- October 31 – John VIII Palaeologus, Byzantine Emperor (b. 1390)
- date unknown
  - Petru III of Moldavia
