= Mușat =

Muşat may refer to:

- House of Bogdan-Muşat, the ruling family which established the Principality of Moldova with Bogdan I
- Petru Muşat, the Voivode (prince) of Moldavia from 1375 to 1391
- Roman I Muşat, Voivode of Moldavia from December 1391 to March 1394
- Costea Muşat, Voivode of Moldavia between 1373 and 1374
- Simona Muşat, a Romanian rower
- Nicolae Muşat, a Romanian football (soccer) Defenfer
