= List of monarchs of Moldavia =

This is a list of monarchs of Moldavia, from the first mention of the medieval polity east of the Carpathians and until its disestablishment in 1862, when it united with Wallachia, the other Danubian Principality, to form the modern-day state of Romania.

== Succession and naming rules ==
Dynastic rule is hard to ascribe, given the loose traditional definition of the ruling family (on principle, princes were chosen from any branch, including a previous monarch's bastard sons – being defined as os de domn – "of domn marrow", or as having hereghie – "heredity" (from the Latin hereditas); the institutions charged with the election, dominated by the boyars, had fluctuating degrees of influence). The system itself was challenged by usurpers, and became obsolete with the Phanariote epoch, when monarchs were appointed by the Ottoman Sultans. Between 1821 and 1862, various systems combining election and appointment were put in practice.

Moldavian monarchs, like Wallachian and other Eastern European monarchs, bore the titles of Voivode or/and Hospodar. When writing in Romanian, the term Domn (from the Latin dominus) was used.

Most monarchs did not use the form of the name they are cited with, and several used more than one form of their own name; in some cases, the monarch was only mentioned in foreign sources. The full names are either modern versions or ones based on mentions in various chronicles.

== List ==
The list is brought up to date for the first monarchs, following the documented studies by Ștefan S. Gorovei and Constantin Rezachevici.

=== Princes of Moldavia ===
==== House of Dragoș ====
| Portrait | Monarch | Reign | Remarks |
|---|---|---|---|
| | Dragoș I | c. 1347–c. 1354 | Described as an early monarch of Moldavia, he was sent there as a representative of king Louis I of Hungary to establish a line of defense against the Golden Horde, where he ruled. |
| | Sas | c. 1354–c. 1363 | son of Dragoș |
| | Balc | c. | son of Sas |

==== House of Bogdan-Mușat ====
| Portrait | Monarch | Reign | Consort | Notes |
|---|---|---|---|---|
| | Bogdan I the Founder | c. 1359–1367 | Maria three children | Deposed Sas |
| | Peter I | 1367 – July 1368 | Unmarried | Grandson of Bogdan I, rule not universally accepted by modern historians. |
| | Lațcu | July 1368 – 1375 | Anna before 1372 one child | Son of Bogdan I, deposed Petru I |
| | Peter II | 1375 – December 1391 | Sophia of Lithuania; 1387 no children Olga of Masovia; 1388 no children | Son of Costea and Margareta; often referred as Petru I Mușat |
| | Roman I | December 1391 – March 1394 | Anastasia three children | Brother of the predecessor. |
| | Stephen I | March 1394 – 28 November 1399 | Unmarried | Son of Roman I. |
| | Iuga | 28 November 1399 – 29 June 1400 | Unmarried | Son of Roman I, deposed by intervention of Mircea I of Wallachia |
| | Alexander I the Good | 29 June 1400 – 1 January 1432 | Margareta of Losoncz; 1394 two children Anna Neacsa of Podolsk; 1405 three children Ringala of Lithuania; 1419 (divorced 13 December 1421) no children Marina Bratul; 1421 three children | Son of Roman I, installed by Mircea I of Wallachia |
| | Iliaș I | 1 January 1432 – October 1433 4 August 1435 – May 1443 | Maria Olshanki of Lithuania; 23 October 1425 three children | Son of Alexandru I; Deposed by Stefan II, joined his rule in 1435. |
| | Stephen II | October 1433 – 13 July 1447 | Unmarried | Illegitimate son of Alexandru I; Only de facto monarch till September 1434. |
| | Peter III | May 1444 – 1445 22 August – 23 December 1447 5 April – 10 October 1448 | An unknown sister of John Hunyadi before 1445 no children | Also joined firstly Ștefan II's rule, before returning in 1447 independently. |
| | Roman II | 13 July – 22 August 1447 23 December 1447 – bet. 25 February/5 April 1448 | Unmarried | son of Iliaș; 1st rule |
| | Csupor de Monoszló (Ciubăr Vodă) | 10 October – December 1448 | Unknown | Non-dynastic usurper. Born in Croatia, he was a Hungarian nobleman, commander of troops of John Hunyadi. He was sent in support of Petru III to depose his brother Roman, but Petru died suddenly two months later. Csupor ascended at the throne. His name, literally Tub Voivode was mentioned by Grigore Ureche. |
| | Alexăndrel | December 1448 – 12 January 1449 24 February 1452 – 22 August 1454 8 February – 25 March 1455 | Unmarried | Son of Iliaș I. |
| | Bogdan II | 12 January 1449 – 15 October 1451 | Oltea before 1433 six children | Nephew of Alexandru I. |
| | Peter III Aaron | 15 October 1451 – 24 February 1452 22 August 1454 – 8 February 1455 25 March 1455 – 12 April 1457 | Unknown before 1455 one child | Illegitimate son of Alexandru I. |
| | Stephen III the Great | 12 April 1457 – 2 July 1504 | Eudokia Olelkovna of Lithuania; 5 July 1463; Suceava three children Maria Asanina Palaiologina of Gothia; 14 September 1472; Suceava four children Maria Voichița of Wallachia; 1478 three children | Son of Bogdan II. In his reign Moldavia reaches its zenith. |
| | Bogdan III The One-Eyed | 2 July 1504 – 22 April 1517 | Anastasia; 1510 no children Ruxandra of Wallachia; 21 July 1513 no children | son of Ștefan III the Great; |
| | Regency of Luca Arbore, gatekeeper of Suceava (22 April 1517 – 1523) | | | Son of Bogdan III; also called Ștefăniță. |
| | Stephen IV the Younger | 22 April 1517 – 14 January 1527 | Stana of Wallachia; 1524 no children | Son of Bogdan III; also called Ștefăniță. |
| | Peter IV Rareș | 14 January 1527 – 14 September 1538 9/16 February 1541 – 2/3 September 1546 | Maria before 1529 four children Elena of Serbia; 1530 four children | Illegitimate son of Stephen the Great. |
| | Stephen V Locust | 21 September 1538 – 20 December 1540 | Chiajna before 1540 two children | Grandson of Stephen the Great. |
| | Alexandru Cornea the Evil | 21 December 1540 – 9/16 February 1541 | Unmarried | Son of Bogdan III. |
| | Regency of Elena of Serbia (2/3 September 1546 - 30 May 1551) | | | 1st son of Petru Rareș. Deposed and eventually converted to Islam. |
| | Ilie II Rareș | 2 or 3 September 1546 – 30 May 1551 | (married several wives as a Muslim) | 1st son of Petru Rareș. Deposed and eventually converted to Islam. |
| | Regency of Elena of Serbia (30 May 1551 – 1 September 1552) | | | 2nd son of Petru Rareș, attempted an alliance with Hungary; ended up assassinated by his boyars, and was shortly followed by his mother, strangled by them in the following year. |
| | Stephen VI Rareș | 30 May 1551 – 1 September 1552 | Unmarried | 2nd son of Petru Rareș, attempted an alliance with Hungary; ended up assassinated by his boyars, and was shortly followed by his mother, strangled by them in the following year. |
| | Ioan Joldea | bet. 4/12 September 1552 | Unmarried | Non-dynastic. Ruled 2 or 3 days in 1552. |
| | Alexandru IV Lăpușneanu | 12 September 1552 – 30 November 1561 10 March 1564 – 9 March 1568 | Ruxandra of Moldavia; January 1556 fourteen children | Son of Bogdan III, brother of Ștefan IV. |
| | Ioan Iacob Heraclid | 18 November 1561 – 9 November 1563 | An illegitimate daughter of Mircea IV of Wallachia no children | The Despot Vodă, non-dynastic. Tried, unsuccessfully, to introduce Lutheranism in Moldavia. |
| | Ștefan Tomșa | 9 August 1563 – bet. 20 February/10 March 1564 | Unknown at least two children | Non-dynastic. Came to power after a boyar revolt that deposed Ioan Iacob Heraclid. |
| | Regency of Ruxandra of Moldavia (9 March 1568 – November 1570) | | | Son of Alexandru IV Lăpușneanu. |
| | Bogdan IV | 9 March 1568 – 15 February 1572 | A princess from the Paniczewsk family 1571 one child | Son of Alexandru IV Lăpușneanu. |
| | John III the Terrible | 15 February 1572 – 11 June 1574 | Maria Semyonovna of Rostov; 1552; Moscow two children | Son of Ștefan IV; also called cel Viteaz (the Brave). |

==== House of Bogdan-Muşat, with interventions of Basarab (Drăculeşti line) and Movilești dynasties ====
| Portrait | Monarch | Reign | Family | Notes |
|---|---|---|---|---|
| | Peter V the Lame | June 1574 – 23 November 1577 1 January 1578 – 21 November 1579 17 October 1582 – 29 August 1591 | Drăculești | |
| | Ivan Pidkova | November–December 1577 | Hetman | Non-dynastic. Hetman in Ukraine (1577–78), also called Nicoară Potcoavă or Ivan Sarpega. |
| | John II the Saxon | 21 November 1579 – September 1582 | Bogdan-Mușat | Illegitimate son of Petru Rareș |
| | Aaron the Tyrant | September 1591 – June 1592 October 1592 – 4 May 1595 | Bogdan-Mușat | son of Alexandru Lăpușneanu; 1st rule |
| | Alexander III the Bad | June – August 1592 | Bogdan-Mușat | son of Bogdan IV; also ruled Wallachia (1592–1593) |
| | Peter VI the Cossack | 1592 | Bogdan-Mușat | son of Alexandru IV Lăpușneanu |
| | Ștefan Răzvan | 1595 | Muslim Roman | Non-dynastic. |
| | Ieremia Movilă | August 1595 – May 1600 September 1600 – 10 July 1606 | Movilești | grandson of Petru Rareș; 1st rule |
| | Michael the Brave | 1600 | Drăculești | Also ruled Wallachia (1593–1600) and Transylvania (1599–1600) |
| | Simion Movilă | July 1606 – 14 September 1607 | Movilești | brother of Ieremia Movilă |
| | Mihail Movilă | 24 September – October 1607 November – December 1607 | Movileşti | son of Ieremia Movilă; 1st rule |
| | Regency of Elzbieta Csomortany de Losoncz (October 1607 and December 1607 – 20 November 1611) | | | Son of Ieremia Movilă. |
| | Constantin Movilă | October 1607 December 1607 – 20 November 1611 | Movilești | Son of Ieremia Movilă. |
| | Ștefan Tomșa II | 20 November 1611 – 22 November 1615 September 1621 – August 1623 | Bogdan-Mușat | Non-dynastic. Probably a relative of Ștefan Tomșa I. |
| | Regency of Elzbieta Csomortany de Losoncz (22 November 1615 – 2 August 1616) | | | |
| | Alexandru Movilă | 22 November 1615 – 2 August 1616 | Movilești | |
| | Radu Mihnea | 2 August 1616 – 9 February 1619 4 August 1623 – 13 January 1626 | Drăculești | |
| | Gaspar Graziani | 9 February 1619 – 29 September 1620 | Graziani | Non-dynastic. |
| | Alexandru IV Iliaş | 29 September 1620 – October 1621 5 December 1631 – April 1633 | Bogdan-Mușat | Nephew of Petru VI, Aron and Bogdan IV |
| | Miron Barnovschi-Movilă | 13 January 1626 – July 1629 April – 2 July 1633 | Movilești | |
| | Alexander the Child | July 1629 – 29 April 1630 | Drăculești | |
| | Moise Movilă | 28 April 1630 – November 1631 2 July 1633 – April 1634 | Movilești | |
| | Vasile Lupu | April 1634 - 13 April 1653 8 May – 16 July 1653 | Coci | Non-dynastic |
| | Gheorghe Ștefan | 13 April – 8 May 1653 16 July 1653 – 13 March 1658 | Görgicze | Non-dynastic |

=== Pre-Phanariote period ===
The Ottoman influence in the Moldavian rulers' election grows from the mid-17th century onward. From 1659, the rulers elected are mostly scions of Greek families, and increasingly less linked to the original Moldavian ruling family. The process reached its peak with the called Phanariote period (1715–1859), where, between the rulers, there was already no connection (or a very distant one) with the dynasty of Bogdan-Musat.

==== Various dynasties ====
| Portrait | Monarch | Reign | Family | Remarks |
|---|---|---|---|---|
| | Gheorghe Ghica | 1658–1659 | Ghica | |
| | Constantin Șerban | 1659 1661 | Basarab | |
| | Ștefan Lupu | 1659–1661 1661 | Coci | also called Papură-Vodă (Bullrush Voivode); 1st rule |
| | Eustratie Dabija | 1661–1665 | Dabija | |
| | Gheorghe Duca | 1665–1666 1668–1672 1678–1683 | | |
| | Iliaș Alexandru | 1666–1668 | Bogdan-Mușat | The last member of the House of Bogdan-Mușat reigning in Moldavia; son of Alexandru VII. |
| | Ştefan Petriceicu | 1672–1673 1673–1674 1683–1684 | Petriceicu | 1st rule |
| | Dumitrașcu Cantacuzino | 1673 1674–1675 1684–1685 | Cantacuzino | 1st rule |
| | Antonie Ruset | 1675–1678 | Rosetti | |
| | Constantin Cantemir | 1685–1693 | Cantemirești | |
| | Dimitrie Cantemir | 1693 1710–1711 | Cantemirești | 1st rule; deposed by Ottomans |
| | Constantin Duca | 1693–1695 1700–1703 | | |
| | Antioh Cantemir | 1695–1700 1705–1707 | Cantemirești | 1st rule |
| | Chancellor; Ioan Buhuș | 1703 1709–1710 | Buhuș | |
| | Mihai Racoviță | 1703–1705 1707–1709 1715–1726 | Racoviță | |
| | Nicolae Mavrocordat | 1709–1710 1711–1715 | Mavrocordato | 1st rule |

=== Phanariotes (1711–1821) ===
| Portrait | Monarch | Reign | Family | Remarks |
|---|---|---|---|---|
| | Caimacam; Lupu Costachi | 1711 | Costachi | |
| | Ioan Ι Mavrocordat | 1711 | Mavrocordato | |
| | Nicolae Mavrocordat | 1711–1715 | Mavrocordato | 2nd rule |
| | Mihai III Racoviță | 1715–1726 | Racoviță | |
| | Grigore II Ghica | 1726–1733 1735–1739 1739–1741 1747–1748 | Ghica | 1st rule |
| | Constantin Mavrocordat | 1733–1735 1741–1743 1748–1749 | Mavrocordato | 1st rule |
Russian occupation (1739) (Russo-Austrian-Turkish War (1735–1739))
| | Ioan II Mavrocordat | 1743–1747 | Mavrocordato | son of Nicolae Mavrocordat and brother to Constantin Mavrocordat |
| | Iordache Stavrachi | 1749 | Stavrachi | |
| | Constantin Racoviță | 1749–1753 1756–1757 | Racoviță | |
| | Matei Ghica | 1753–1756 | Ghica | |
| | Scarlat Ghica | 1757–1758 | Ghica | |
| | Ioan Teodor Callimachi | 1758–1761 | Callimachi | |
| | Grigore Callimachi | 1761–1764 1767–1769 | Callimachi | 1st rule |
| | Grigore III Ghica | 1764–1767 1774–1777 | Ghica | 1st rule |
Russian occupation (1769–1774) (Russo-Turkish War (1768–1774))
| | Constantin Moruzi | 1777–1782 | Mourousi | |
| | Alexandru Mavrocordat Delibey | 1782–1785 | Mavrocordato | |
| | Alexandru Mavrocordat Firaris | 1785–1786 | Mavrocordato | |
| | Alexandru Ipsilanti | 1786–1788 | Ypsilanti | |
Habsburg occupation (1787–1791); Military commander: Prince Josias of Saxe-Coburg
| | Emanuel Giani Ruset | 1788–1789 | Rosetti | also called Manole or Manolache |
Russian occupation (1788–1791) (Russo-Turkish War (1787–1792))
| | Alexandru Moruzi | 1792 1802 1806–1807 | Mourousi | 1st rule |
| | Mihai Suțu | 1793–1795 | Soutzos | also called Draco |
| | Alexandru Callimachi | 1795–1799 | Callimachi | |
| | Constantin Ipsilanti | 1799–1801 | Ypsilanti | |
| | Alexandru Suțu | 1801–1802 | Soutzos | |
| | Chancellor; Iordache Conta | 1802 | | |
| | Scarlat Callimachi | 1806 1807–1810 1812–1819 | Callimachi | deposed by Russians |
Russian occupation (1806–1812) (Russo-Turkish War (1806–1812)); Bessarabia is placed under Imperial Russian rule in 1812. (See also President of Moldova, for the heads of state of Moldova, a part of this territory which became independent in the 20th century.)
| | Alexandru Hangerli | 1807 | Hangerli | |
| | Caimacam; Iordache Ruset-Roznovanu | 1807 | Rosetti | |
| | Caimacam Metropolitan; Veniamin Costache | 1807–1812 1821 | | 1st term |
| | Mihail Suțu | 1819–1821 | Soutzos | |
| | Stolnici; Manu and Rizos-Nerulos | 1819 | Manos; Rizos | |
| | Filiki Eteria occupation | 1821 | Ypsilanti | military commander: Alexander Ypsilantis |
| | Caimacam; Stefan Bogoridi (Ștefan Vogoride) | 1821–1822 | | |

=== Post-Phanariote period ===
| Portrait | Monarch | Reign | Family | Remarks |
|---|---|---|---|---|
| | Ioan Sturdza | 1822–1828 | Sturdza | |
Russian occupation (1828–1834); Military commanders: Fyodor Pahlen, Pyotr Zheltukhin, and Pavel Kiseleff
Organic Statute government (1832–1856)
| | Mihail Sturdza | 1834–1849 | Sturdza | |
| | Grigore Alexandru Ghica | 1849–1853 1854–1856 | Ghica | 1st rule |
Russian occupation (1853–1854) (Crimean War)
Protectorate established by the Treaty of Paris (1856–1859)
| | Extraordinary Administrative Council | 1856 | | |
| | Caimacam; Teodor Balș | 1856–1857 | Balș | |
| | Caimacam; Nicolae Vogoride | 1857–1858 | | |
| | Caimacams | 1858–1859 | Catargiu; Sturdza; Panu; Cantacuzino | Ștefan Catargiu, Vasile Sturdza and Anastasie Panu (Catargiu resigns in 1858 and is replaced by Ioan A. Cantacuzino) |
| | Alexandru Ioan Cuza | 1859–1862 | Cuza | also ruled Wallachia in personal union as the United Principalities of Moldavia and Wallachia. |
Formal union of Moldavia and Wallachia in 1862 as the Romanian United Principalities. A new constitution came into effect in 1866 giving the country the official name Romania. For later rulers, see Domnitor and King of Romania.

== See also ==
- List of rulers of Wallachia
