= Iliaș of Moldavia =

Moldavian prince

Iliaș I

Prince of Moldavia (1st reign)
- Reign: January 1432 – October 1433
- Predecessor: Alexander I of Moldavia
- Successor: Ștefan II of Moldavia

Prince of Moldavia (2nd reign)
- Reign: August 1435 – May 1443
- Predecessor: Ștefan II of Moldavia
- Successor: Ștefan II of Moldavia
- Born: 20 July 1409
- Died: 23 April 1448 (aged 38)
- Spouse: Maria of Halshany
- Issue: Roman II and Alexăndrel
- Dynasty: Bogdan-Mușat
- Father: Alexander I of Moldavia
- Mother: Ana Neacșa
- Religion: Orthodox

Iliaș or Ilie I (20 July 1409 – 23 April 1448) was Prince (Voivode) of Moldavia twice: from January 1432 to October 1433 and with his brother Stephen II from August 1435 to May 1443.

== Life ==
The son of Prince Alexandru cel Bun and Ana Neacșa, he was designated co-ruler and nominated successor by his father. In 1433, Iliaș pledged his vassalage to Władysław II Jagiełło, Jagiellon King of Poland. He married Maria, a scion of the Olshanski family of Lithuanian nobility (granddaughter of Ivan Olshanski and sister of Władysław II's wife, Sophia of Halshany). Iliaș and Maria had at least two sons, Roman II and Alexăndrel.

Iliaș faced the rebellion of his brother Stephen and several boyars, who, helped by Prince Vlad II Dracul of neighboring Wallachia, managed to dethrone him. Iliaș enlisted the help of Władysław II, but he was defeated by the new prince and escaped to Poland. After Stephen pledged allegiance to the Poles, the latter imprisoned Iliaș until the ascension of Władysław III. In 1434, Iliaș' Polish supporters facilitated his freedom and convinced the king to consider withdrawing his support for Stephen.

After an indecisive battle in 1435 (at Podraga or Podagra, the present-day village of Podriga in Drăgușeni), Władysław III intervened to appease the conflict and helped institute a shared rule of the two brothers over Moldavia (with Iliaș as nominal ruler and with Stephen as lord over the southeastern part of the country—in Tecuci, Kilia, Vaslui, and Covurlui—although both shared residence in Suceava). In return, Iliaș agreed to pay an annual tribute to Poland (100 horses, 400 silk sheets, 400 oxen, 300 cartfuls of sturgeon) and to concede rule over Khotyn and Pokuttya.

A decrease in Poland's interest in the region led Stephen to rebel. Again deposed, Iliaș was blinded (as custom prevented disabled people from ascending to the throne) and thrown in jail. He died there at an unknown time.

His wife Maria fled to Poland with her sons, where she took over rule over Pokuttya—defending it against the armies of Stephen. Roman, Iliaș and Maria's son, remained ruler of the region, titling himself Prince of Moldavia and vassal to Władysław III; he was to be recognized as co-ruler by Stephen, and would eventually depose him. His other son was Alexăndrel.

== See also ==
Ancestors of Iliaș of Moldavia

8. Costea of Moldavia
4. Roman I of Moldavia
2. Alexander I of Moldavia
5. Margareta Mușata
1. Iliaș of Moldavia
3. Ana Neacșa

== Notes ==
Preceded by Alexandru cel Bun	Voivode of Moldavia; 1432–1433	Succeeded by Stephen II
Preceded by Stephen II	Voivode of Moldavia; 1435–1443 jointly with Stephen II	Succeeded by Stephen II
