= Bogdana Monastery =

Coordinates: 47°50′33.36″N 25°55′2.69″E

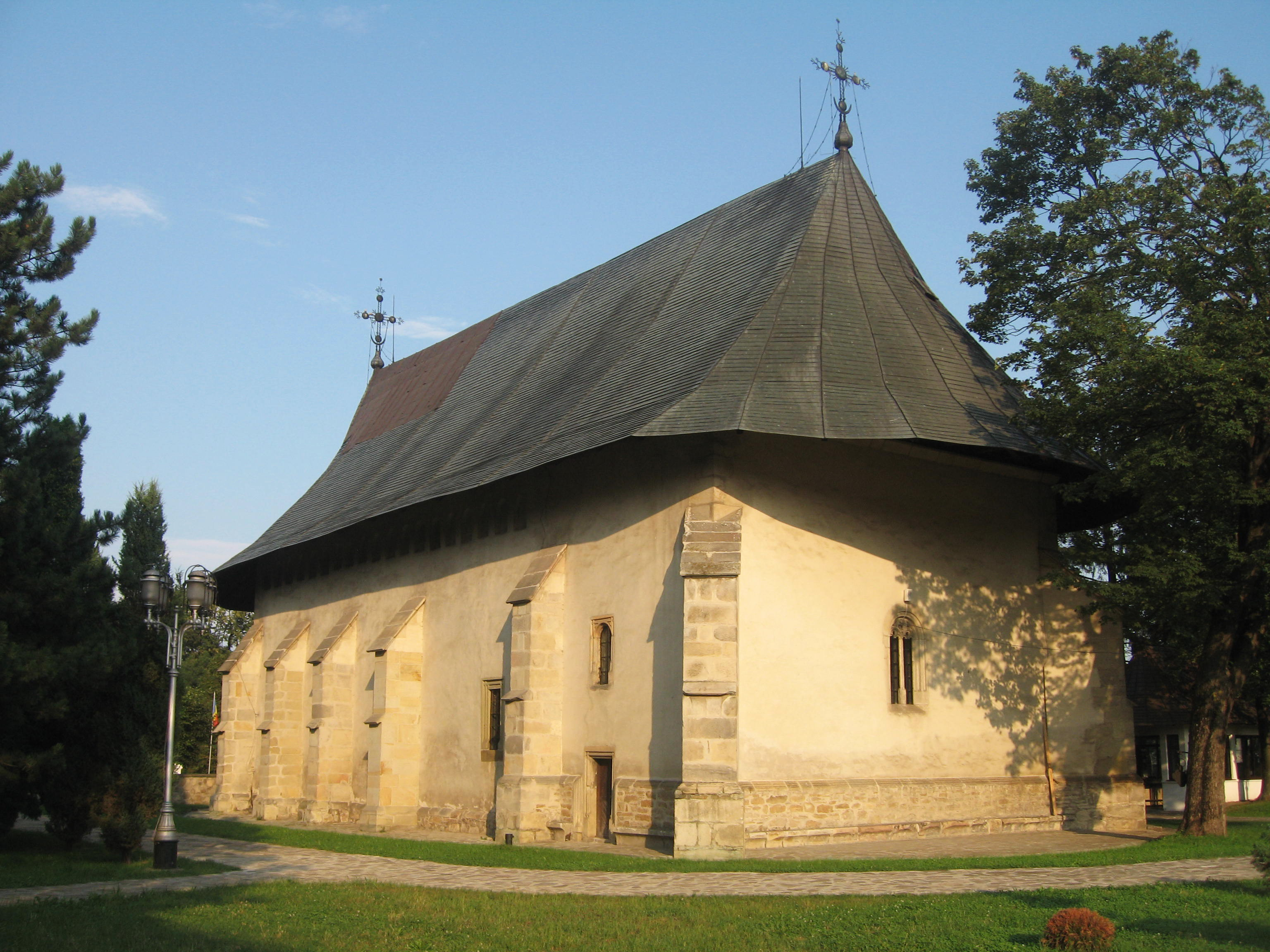
Bogdana Monastery in August, 2010

Bogdana Monastery is a Romanian Orthodox monastery in the town of Rădăuți, northern Romania. Its church is the oldest still standing religious building in Moldavia. The monastery was built by Bogdan I of Moldavia (1359–1365) sometime around 1360.

== Burials ==
It was to become the necropolis of the House of Mușat voievodes. Here are buried all the rulers of Moldavia from Bogdan I to Alexander the Good. There are ten graves inside the monastery's church:

- seven in the naos:
  - Bogdan I (in the south-eastern corner)
  - Lațcu Voievod (besides the same wall as Bogdan I)
  - an unmarked grave supposedly Maria's–Bogdan I's wife, or Ana's–Lațcu's wife; the grave is at ground level and not above it as the other ones
  - Ștefan I (on the northern wall)
  - Roman I (on the northern wall)
  - Bogdan, brother of Alexander the Good (on the northern wall)
  - Bogdan, son of Alexander the Good (on the northern wall)
- three in the pronaos:
  - Lady Stana, wife of Bogdan III cel Chior and the mother of Ștefăniță Vodă (on the northern side)
  - Anastasia, daughter of Lațcu (on the northern side)
  - Bishop Ioanichie (died 1504) (before the pronaos door)

The graves were attended to, and marked properly by Ștefan cel Mare. The rocks on top of the graves were created by Jan (c. 1480) at the order of Ștefan cel Mare, "in a style that is different in principle from the oriental decorative sculpture" (P. Comărnescu). They are decorated with Byzantine-oriental ornaments like palmata–a stylized palm plant leaf and local motives like leaves of beech, ash tree leaves, elm tree leaves.

== Paintings ==
The first internal painting of the church is from the times of Alexander the Good (14th century). In 1558 Alexandru Lăpușneanu started the restoration of the original painting and following year enlarged the church building. Other restorations happened in the 18th and 19th centuries: between 1745 and 1750, in the time of Bishop Iacob Putneanul and in 1880 when Epaminonda Bucevschi, a Bukovinean painter, created the current frescoin tempera.
