= Roman II of Moldavia =

Roman II

Prince of Moldavia
- Reign: 15 September 1447 – 23 February 1448
- Predecessor: Stephen II of Moldavia
- Successor: Petru III of Moldavia
- Born: 1426
- Died: 2 July 1448 (aged 21–22)
- Dynasty: Bogdan-Mușat
- Father: Iliaş of Moldavia
- Mother: Maria Olszanska
- Religion: Orthodox

Roman II of Moldavia (Romanian: Roman al II-lea al Moldovei; 1426 – 2 July 1448) was the son of Iliaş of Moldavia and Maria Olszanska from the noble Polish family of Olshanski. He was a co-ruler of Moldavia 1447–1448, ruling together with his uncle Petru after killing his other uncle, Stephen II of Moldavia, with Polish support. Later, due to the Ottoman invasion of Moldavia, he had to flee to Kraków where he died at the age of 22.

Ancestors of Roman II of Moldavia

16. Costea of Moldavia
8. Roman I of Moldavia
17. Margareta Muşata
4. Alexander I of Moldavia
2. Iliaş of Moldavia
5. Ana Neacşa
1. Roman II of Moldavia
24. Algimantas
12. Ivan Olshanski
6. Andrew Olshanski
3. Maria Olszanska

Preceded by Stephen II	Prince/Voivode of Moldavia; 1447–48	Succeeded by Petru III
