= Stefan II =

Stefan II may refer to:

- Stefan Nemanjić (1165–1228)
- Ştefan II of Moldavia (died 1447)
