= Iuga of Moldavia =

Iuga

Voivode of Moldavia
- Reign: 28 November 1399 – 29 June 1400
- Predecessor: Sephen I
- Successor: Alexander the Good
- Born: unknown
- Died: 19 July 1400
- Religion: Orthodox

Iuga of Moldavia (14th century – July 19, 1400) (known also as Iurg or Iurie in Romanian literature, Yury in Ruthenian, Jerzy in Polish; the epithet Ologul means "the Crippled") was Voivode (Prince) of Moldavia from November 1399 to June 1400. According to one hypothesis, he may have been the Lithuanian prince George Koriatovich. Other hypotheses posit him as the son of Roman I of Moldavia (ruled 1391–1394) and an unknown wife, possibly of Lithuanian extraction from descendants of Karijotas, confused with the Lithuanian prince because of the similar name and background. The nickname "the Crippled" can be found only in the chronicle of Putna Monastery, drafted in the first years of the 16th century, but its origins are unknown. The reasons why he has remained in history with this nickname are not known precisely (probably suffered from a disease that makes it difficult to move).

== Biography ==
Iuga Ologul was the second son of Moldovan regnant Roman Mușat and Anastasia Mushat. According to some historical sources, Iuga have reigned for a few months. According to other sources, Iuga have ruled for two years.

In historical sources, there is a confusion between Iuga Ologul and the Lithuanian prince Yuri Koriatovich (sometimes named as Jurg Coriatovici or Iurie Koriatovici) of Podolia. This confusion is due to the fact that the name Iuga is a locally adapted version of the Ruthenian name Yuri. In fact, it is assumed that Iuga Ologul was baptized in honor of this prince, since he was the son of Roman the Ist and of his first wife, the Lithuanian princes of Koriatovites origin, the rulers of Podolia.

Iuga had brothers from his father's first marriage, Michael and Stephen (who reigned with the name of Stephen the Ist before him, from 1394 to 1399), and from the second marriage two stepbrothers: Alexander (the future regnant Alexandru cel Bun) and Bogdan "jupânul" (“the boss”).

== Ruling ==
In the majority of sources it is believed that Iuga Ologul took over the leadership of Moldova even before the death of his brother, Stefan I (which is known from the rule issued by Iuga Voda on November 28, 1399, who was dead on that date); probably giving up for health reasons. It is assumed that Stefan I appointed Iuga Ologul as successor, since his children, Bogdan and Stephen (recalled only in the bead roll ( "pomelnik") of St. Nicholas Monastery, Probota Veche, founded by their father) were too young succeed the throne and the boyars had a great influence in the country's politics and could have imposed their own candidate.

Iuga Ologul was challenged from the very beginning, by his stepbrother Alexander, who at his father's death had fled together with his brother Bogdan, according to a source at Curtea de Argeș (under his protection Mircea cel Bătrân). The documents of that time, pointed out that Mircea Voda entered to Moldova, leading the army and installed Alexandru for reigning. Iuga had been taken as hostage to Wallachia, where he died January 7, 1403 (when Alexandru cel Bun did not mention him “ holy dead of before") and in 1407, in the Bistrița Monastery, he was recorded as dead.

From the rule of Iuga Voda Ologul, on November 28, 1399, it also appears that he was married and had offspring ("this is my belief, Iuga voivode, and the faith of my children, and the faith of Stephen the Voivode and his children, the faith of his brothers, the belief of Olecsandro, the belief of Bogdan ... "), but the name of his wife remained unknown. His funeral probably took place in Wallachia, but until now, it is not known where he was buried.

== See also ==
Ancestors of Iuga of Moldavia

4. Costea of Moldavia
2. Roman I of Moldavia
1. Iuga of Moldavia
3. Undetermined

Preceded by Ştefan I	Prince/Voivode of Moldavia; 1399–1400	Succeeded by Alexander I
