= Iuga =

Iuga may refer to

- Iuga of Moldavia, Prince of Moldavia in 1399–1400
- Dan Iuga (born 1945), Romanian-American pistol shooter and coach
- Nora Iuga (born 1931), Romanian poet, writer and translator
