= Ciubăr Vodă =

Governor of the Principality of Moldavia

Csupor de Monoszló (Romanian: Ciubăr Vodă) was a Hungarian aristocrat of Croatian origin, a commander of John Hunyadi's troops that were sent to support Petru III in gaining the Moldavian throne from Roman II. Ciubăr Vodă governed Moldavia for about two months after the unexpected death of Petru possibly at the end of January 1449, as in February, Alexăndrel took the Moldavian throne for the first time. He is only mentioned by Grigore Ureche, as ruler of Moldova for two months after Petru III of Moldavia.

== Position of Nicolae Iorga ==
According to Nicolae Iorga, Ciubăr Vodă is a prince who ruled for two months 1448–1449. Iorga opined that Ciubăr/Csupor was Alexander I's relative and claimed that otherwise the Moldavian boyars would not have accepted a Hungarian commander, but only an individual of princely kin. However we have no proof that Csupor was anything more than a caretaker for the throne, most likely on behalf of John Hunyadi as Petru III of Moldavia had married John's sister just before being placed on the throne. Iorga also insisted that Ciubar is not a nickname, but a name of a court marshal Ciope, who lived around 1451, whose name would have given the forms of the name Ciopel, Ciopor, Ciobâr, which would mean "the Devil" (Dracul). However, his opinion was not shared by Romanian historians. In Hungarian, as well as in Croatian and Romanian "csupor" or "ciubăr" means "a large wooden bucket with staves and two handles".
