= Ștefan Surdul =

Prince of Wallachia (1591–1592)

Prince of Wallachia
- Reign: May 1591 – August 1592
- Predecessor: Mihnea Turcitul
- Successor: Alexandru cel Rău
- Born: unknown
- Died: 2 February 1595
- Dynasty: House of Bogdan-Mușat
- Father: Ioan Vodă cel Cumplit
- Religion: Orthodox

Ștefan Surdul (? – 2 February 1595) was the son of Ioan Vodă cel Cumplit. He ruled Wallachia from May 1591 to August 1592. According to one source he was a leather cutter and harness maker by trade.

Ștefan Surdul House of Bogdan-Mușat
Regnal titles
Preceded by Mihnea Turcitul	Voivode of Wallachia; 1591–1592	Succeeded by Alexandru cel Rău
