= Peter I of Moldavia =

Peter I

Voivode of Moldavia
- Reign: 1367–1368
- Predecessor: Bogdan the Founder
- Successor: Lațcu
- Born: unknown
- Died: 1368
- Dynasty: Bogdan-Mușat
- Father: Ştefan son of Bogdan I
- Religion: Orthodox

Peter I (Romanian: Petru I) may have been a Voivode (prince) of Moldavia from the end of 1367 to after July 1368. Several historians, including Constantin Rezachevici and Ioan Aurel Pop, believe him to have been the son of Prince Ştefan, the oldest son of voivode Bogdan I of Moldavia, while others, including historian Juliusz Demel, considered him to be the son of Costea of Moldavia with a daughter of Bogdan I. In the second hypothesis, there was no such voivode of Moldavia in 1367-1368, the first using the regnal name Petru being Petru II of Moldavia.

Preceded by Bogdan	Voivode of Moldavia; 1367–1368	Succeeded by Laţcu
