= Lațcu of Moldavia =

Lațcu
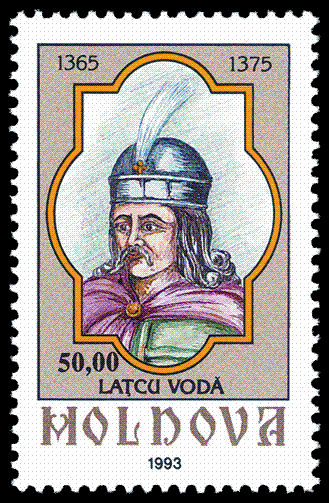

Prince of Moldavia
- Reign: 1367–1375
- Predecessor: Peter I
- Successor: Peter II
- Born: unknown
- Died: 1375
- Dynasty: Bogdan-Mușat?

Lațcu was Voivode of Moldavia from c. 1367 to c. 1375. He converted to Catholicism and attempted to strengthen his realm's autonomy by establishing a Roman Catholic diocese directly subordinated to the Holy See. However, he seems to have accepted the suzerainty of King Louis I of Hungary and Poland in his last years.

== Life ==
Lațcu was the son of Bogdan I of Moldavia, the voivode achieving Moldavia's independence from Louis I. He succeeded his father around 1367. Other sources mention that he deposed his nephew Petru I of Moldavia in 1368. After Louis I of Hungary inherited Poland from his uncle, Casimir III of Poland, in 1370, he could put Lațcu under pressure from both the east and the north. The contemporaneous John of Küküllő said that the voivodes of Moldavia accepted the suzerainty of Louis I of Hungary, suggesting that Lațcu (or already his father) had been forced to yield to the king. However, John of Küküllő did not determine the date of the submission, for which historiand Dennis Delatant says that "[t]here is nothing to suggest that ... Hungarian suzerainty was restored".

In 1369 he converted to the Roman Catholic faith. Lațcu sent two Franciscan friars of Polish origin to Rome in early 1370 in order to inform Pope Urban V of his decision to convert from Orthodoxy to the Roman Catholic faith. He also asked the Pope to establish a Roman Catholic diocese at his seat in Siret. Historian Deletant says that Lațcu must have decided to convert Catholicism primarily for political reasons, because he approached the Holy See directly, without the mediation of Hungarian prelates. The pope soon appointed three prelates (Jan Očko of Vlašim, Archbishop of Prague, Przecław of Pogorzela, Bishop of Wrocław, and Florian Mokrski, Bishop of Cracow) to examine the state of affairs in the principality. Their report was received by his successor, Pope Gregory XI who authorized Florian of Mokrsko to consecrate the Polish Andrzej Jastrzębiec bishop with his see in Siret in 1371. The new diocese was directly subordinated to the Holy See. The pope bestowed on him the title "duke of the Moldavian parts or of the people of Wallachia" (dux Moldaviensis partium seu nationis Wlachie). Lațcu's wife, Ana, and his daughter, Anastasia, did not convert to Catholicism.

Charles IV, Holy Roman Emperor signed a deed in Wrocław on 14 March 1372, declaring that he acknowledged the rights of Louis I of Hungary in Hungary, Poland and other countries, including Moldavia. The exact reasons of Charles's act are unknown;. Historian J. Sýkora theorizes that Lațcu had sought an alliance against the Hungarian monarch with Charles IV, Holy Roman Emperor. The Romanian historian Victor Spinei argues that Lațcu took advantage of his peaceful relations with Louis I by expanding his authority towards the Black Sea coasts in the 1370s. In contrast with him, Ioan-Aurel Pop suggests that Louis I prepared an expedition against Lațcu in 1374.

The exact date of his death is unknown. He died either around 1374 or in 1375. Lațcu was interred in the Orthodox monastery at Rădăuți alongside his father. Little information is known of the events that directly followed his death. According to the 15th-century Lithuanian-Ruthenian Chronicle, the Vlachs elected a prince, George Koriatovich, voivode, according to some historians at an unspecified date. Other stated that George became ruled a part of Moldavia in 1374.

According to historian A. Boldur Lațcu's daughter Anastasia married to George Koriatovich and their children were Iuga Ologul and Anna, wife of Alexander I of Moldavia. This hypothesis was widely criticized as were not based on sources. In fact, Anastasia married Roman I of Moldavia, and had a son together, Alexander I of Moldavia.

== Footnotes ==
Preceded by Petru I	Prince/Voivode of Moldavia c. 1367–c. 1375	Succeeded by Petru II
