= House of Bogdan-Mușat =

Noble family

House of Bogdan (Mușat)
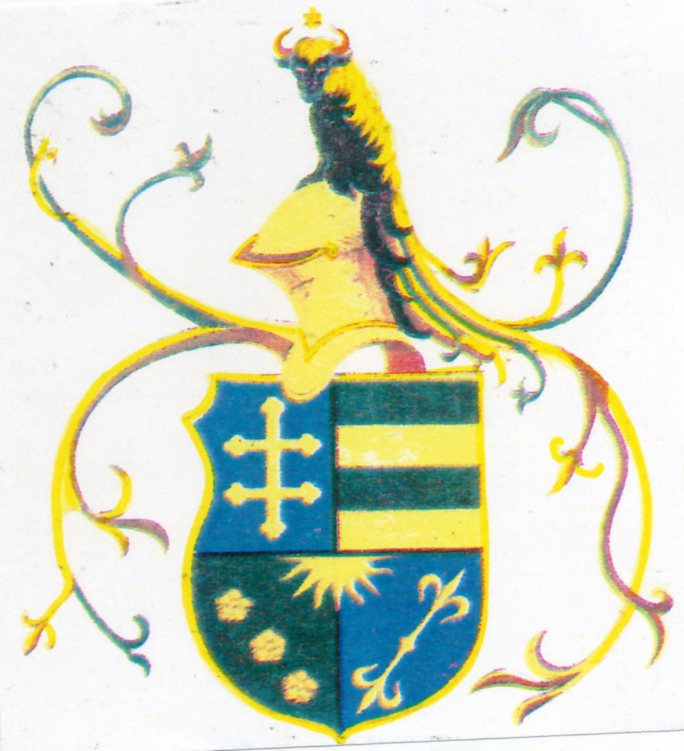
- Country: Moldavia
- Founded: 1363
- Founder: Bogdan I of Moldavia
- Current head: extinct
- Final ruler: Iliaș Alexandru
- Titles: Prince/Voivode (Voievod); Hospodar/Dux (Domn)
- Estate: of Moldavia

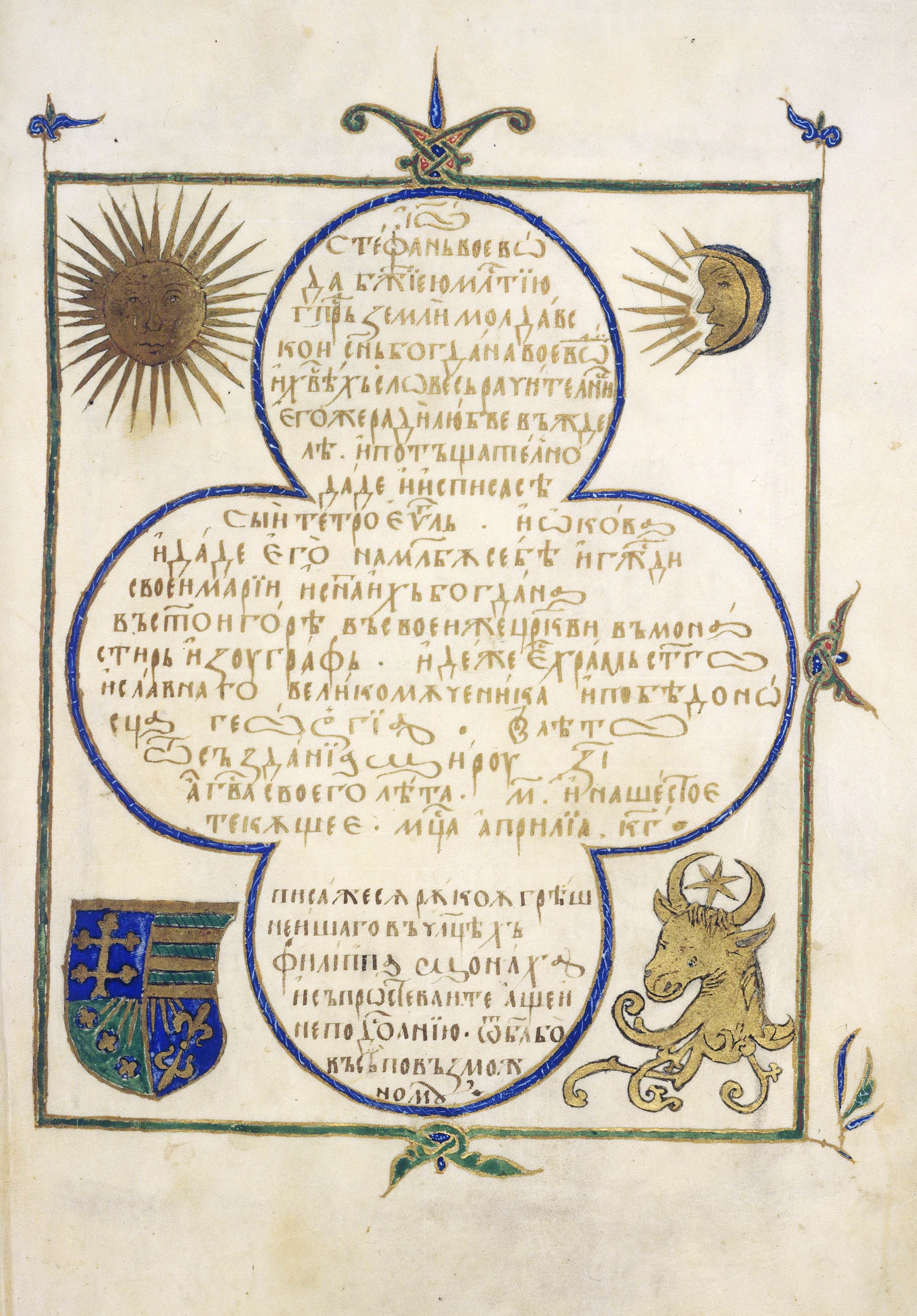
Manuscript folio with the coat of arms of the House of Bogdan (lower-left corner) and the aurochs from Moldavia's coat of arms

The House of Bogdan, commonly referred to as the House of Mușat, was the ruling family which established the Principality of Moldova with Bogdan I (c. 1363–1367), giving the country its first line of Princes, one closely related with the Basarab rulers of Wallachia by several marriages through time. The Mușatins are named after Margareta Mușata, a daughter of Bogdan I, who married Costea. One theory proposes that Costea was a member of House of Basarab.

The word mușat, which gives the dynasty its name, means handsome in Old Romanian dialects.

== Genealogy ==
Recent studies, based on the careful consideration of existing documents and a recently discovered chronicle of Moldavia in Poland, managed to establish the most likely link between Bogdan I and his successors from the so-called house of Mușat, as well as the succession line and ruling periods of each prince from the 14th century.

The following genealogical tree is an oversimplified version, meant to show only the ruling princes, their documented brothers and sisters, and the spouses/extramarital liaisons of those who had ruling heirs, following the conventions:

- Ruling princes have their name emphasized and their ruling years in Moldavia.
- Several members of House of Mușat ruled in Wallachia; those reigning years are marked with W.
- If the prince died while ruling, the last year is preceded by a cross.
- Small numbers at the end of each name are meant to indicate the mother of each offspring.
- No number when the father had several spouses or extramarital affairs, means the mother is unknown.
- Spouses and extramarital liaisons are separated by a horizontal line.
- Indeterminate or illegitimate descent are presented with dashed vertical lines.

Bogdan I 1363-†1367	Maria
Ștefan	?	Costea	Margareta (Mușata)	Lațcu; 1368-†1375	Ana
Ștefan; 1368	Petru I 1367–1368	Petru II; 1375-†1391	Roman I 1392-†1394	Anastasia
Ștefan I^{1} 1394–1399	Mihail^{1}	Iuga^{1} 1399–1400	Alexandru cel Bun^{2} 1400-†1432	Margareta^{1} Ana (Neacșa)^{2} Ringala^{3} Marina^{4} Stanca^{5} ?^{6}	Bogdan^{2}	?
Roman^{1} Vasilisa^{1} Anastasia^{1/2} Maria^{1/2} Alexandru^{4} Bogdan^{4}	Iliaș I^{2} 1432–1442	Maria; Holszańska	Ștefan II^{5} 1433-†1447	Petru III^{4} 1443–1445; 1447, 1448	Petru Aron; 1451–1452; 1454–1455; 1455–1457	Bogdan II^{6} 1449-†1451	Oltea
Roman II; 1438–1442; 1447–1448	Alexăndrel; 1448–1449; 1452–1454 †1455	Anastasia	Ștefan cel Mare; 1457-†1504	Evdokia de Kiev^{1} Maria de Mangop^{2} Maria Voichița^{3} Marușca^{4} Maria^{5}	Maria; Sora; Ioachim; Ioan; Cârstea
Alexandru^{4}	?	Bogdan III^{3} 1504-†1517	Nastasia^{1} Ruxandra^{2} Stana^{3} Nastasia^{4}	Alexandru^{1} Elena^{1} Petru^{1} Ilie^{2} Bogdan^{2} Ana^{3} Maria^{3}	Petru Rareș^{5} 1527–1538; 1541-†1546	Maria^{1} Elena Ecaterina Brancovici^{2} Caterina^{3} ?^{4}
Ștefan Lăcustă; 1538-†1540	Iliaș Rareș^{1} 1546–1551	Ștefan Rareș^{2} 1551-†1552	Iancu Sasul^{3} 1579–1582	Alexandru^{1} Bogdan^{1} Constantin; Bogdan-Constantin^{4} daughter	Maria^{1} Ana^{1} Stana^{1} Maria^{1} Ana^{1} Ion^{1} son^{1}
Ștefăniță^{3} 1517-†1527	Stana^{1} Serpega^{2} Pacoray^{3}	Petru^{3} Ilie^{3} Pătrașcu^{3} Marica^{3} Ana^{3} Ana^{3} Aron; Ioan Iancu	Alexandru Cornea^{3} 1540-†1541	Alexandru Lăpușneanu^{4} 1552–1561; 1564–1568	Ruxandra^{4}
Ștefan; Ionașcu; Mihail Petru; Constantin; Cneajna; Marica; Trofana; Teodora; Anghelina; Anastasia	Bogdan Lăpușneanu; 1568–1572	?	Petru Cazacul †1592	Aron Tiranul; 1591–1592; 1592–1595	Ilie "Blănarul"	?
Ioan Vodă cel Cumplit^{2} 1572-†1574	Maria^{1} Maria Huru^{2} ?^{3}	Ioan Bogdan^{3}	Alexandru cel Rău; 1592; W: 1592–1593	Alexandru Iliaș; 1620–1621; 1631–1633; W: 1616–1618; W: 1627–1629	Elena^{1} Zamfira Duca^{2}
Ștefan Surdul^{2/3} W: 1591–1592	Petru^{1} Lazăr^{3}	Radu Iliaș^{1} W: 1632	Iliaș Alexandru^{2} 1666–1668	Domna (Domnica) Cantacuzino	Casandra^{1} Ruxandra^{1} Bălașa^{1} Suzana^{1}
Radu Iliaș; The last documented heir of House of Musat d. 1704 One child	1 son 1 daughter

== See also ==
- Bogdana Monastery
