= Bistrița Monastery =

Romanian Orthodox monastery

- Mănăstirea Bistrița
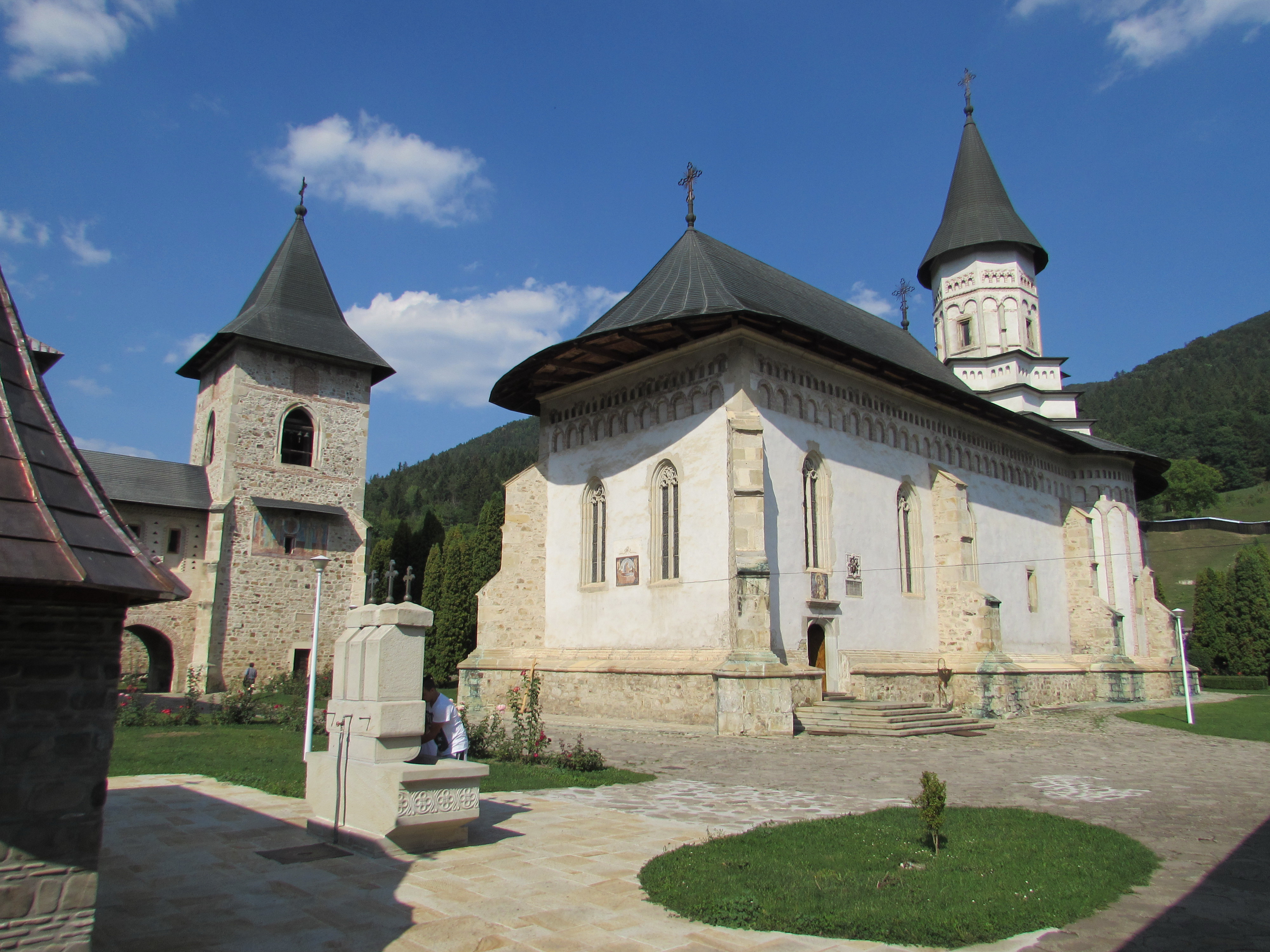
- Church of the Bistrița Monastery

Religion
- Affiliation: Eastern Orthodox
- Ecclesiastical or organisational status: Friary
- Leadership: Metropolitan of Moldavia and Bukovina
- Patron: Dormition of the Mother of God
- Status: Active

Location
- Location: Bistrița, Neamț County, Romania
- Interactive map of Bistrița Monastery
- Coordinates: 46°57′28″N 26°17′21″E

Architecture
- Type: Classic Moldavian
- Founder: Alexandru cel Bun
- Groundbreaking: 1402
- Completed: 1407 (first documentary attestation); 1498 (bell tower); 1546 (defense wall)

Specifications
- Direction of façade: South
- Length: 40 m (130 ft)
- Height (max): 45 m

The Bistrița Monastery (Romanian: Mănăstirea Bistrița, pronounced [ˈbistritsa]) is a Romanian Orthodox monastery located 8 km west of Piatra Neamț. It was dedicated in 1402, having as original ctitor the Moldavian Voivode Alexandru cel Bun whose remains are buried here.

The church is historically and archaeologically valuable. It shows features of Byzantine architecture, is richly ornamented, with a 15th-century entrance door of fine craftsmanship and detailed frescoes.

The monastery is surrounded by 4 meter high stone walls built during Petru Rareș's reign (1541–1546), the original ones being destroyed in 1538 by Suleiman the Magnificent's army. Also from the same period dates a chapel located north of the monastery. The inner court bell tower had already been erected in 1498 by Ștefan cel Mare. With his extensive restoration of the monastery in 1554, Alexandru Lăpușneanu is also considered to be a ctitor. Thus, the monastery is considered to have been donated by 4 voivodes of the Mușatin dynasty (Alexandru I, Ștefan III, Petru IV, Alexandru Lăpușneanu).

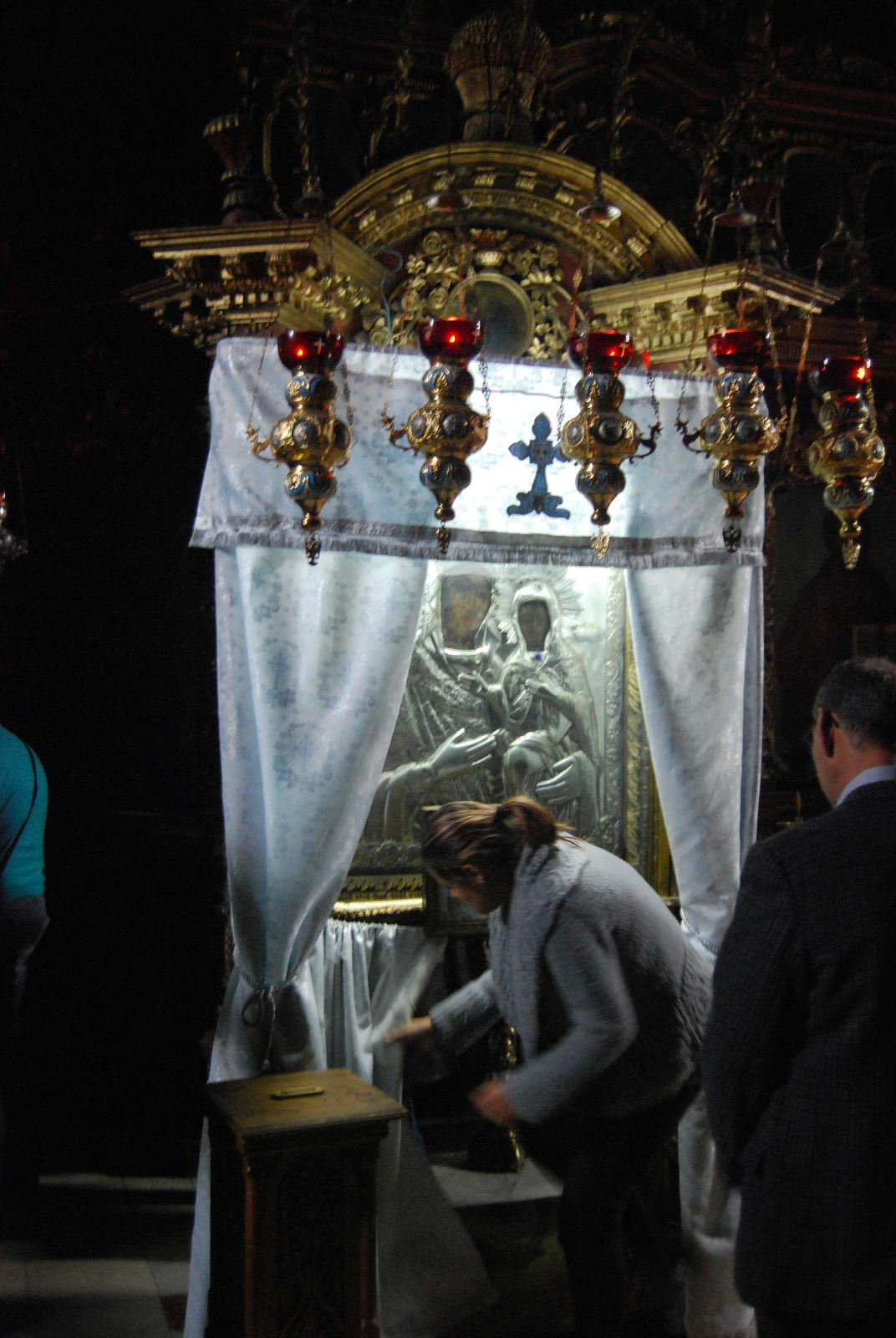
The miraculous icon

A remarkable item preserved here is the miraculous icon of Saint Anne given as a present to the monastery in 1407-1408 by Voivode Alexandru I's wife, Lady Ana. According to tradition, (Note: And an 18th-century manuscript by Metropolitan Gheorghe of Moldova and Suceava, now kept at the State Archives (Arhivele Statului), Piatra Neamț) the icon was given as a "patronage gift" to Lady Ana by empress Jelena, wife of Manuel II Palaiologos, emperor of Constantinople. The icon was restored in the 18th century and in 1853 was placed in a new section, made of carved and gilded wood, of the kliros.

During the year 1855 the monastery underwent major reconstruction under the lead of the famous architect Carol Benesch.

The monastery was an important cultural center for calligraphers, miniaturists and chroniclers. The monastery's museum hosts an important collection of medieval art.

== History ==
Bistrita Monastery has a very high historical and archaeological value. It is built in Byzantine style, richly ornate, with the entrance door kept from the moment of construction being worked with a lot of art. The most remarkable is the icon of St. Ana, the mother of the Virgin Mary. According to tradition, in 1401, this icon was given as "the patronal present" to the lady Ana, the wife of Alexander the Good, by the Empress Irena (Ana), wife of the Byzantine Emperor Manuel II Palaiologos (1391-1425), and Patriarch Matthew, of Constantinople. Subsequently, the Voivode (Prince) family gave the icon to the St. Ana the Bistrita Monastery.

In the church of the monastery are buried: Alexandru the Good (Cel Bun), his wife Ana, Alexandru - the son of Stephen the Great, Chiajna - the wife of Stephen V of Moldavia, Anastasie – the Metropolitan of Suceava.

Bistrita Monastery is the place where one of the oldest monuments of the Romanian medieval culture was created: Pomelnicul de la Bistrița. The pomelnik offers the most interesting data about the beginning of the Moldavian voivodal and church history.

The monasteries are the most important category of monuments that survived the weather of the times, many of them being mirrors of the past. Around the monasteries both the religious life of the community and the culture of the nation have developed. They, monasteries, can also illustrate a military dimension, many of them being real fortresses and playing an active role in the defensive system of the country, given the restrictions imposed by Ottoman domination, especially after the middle of the XVIth century.

The monasteries and hermitages built by the voivodes and boyars, endowed with a rich heritage and important privileges, are the storage of a rich treasure of Romanian culture and civilization. The historical message is made of mural paintings, ancient memories, cult objects, printed books, funerary monuments and stone-preserved inscriptions, as well as the glorification of the voivodes who built them, a part of these monuments representing a gesture of thanksgiving God for help in battles.

== Other burials ==
- Alexandru of Moldavia
