= Stephen II of Moldavia =

Stephen II

Prince of Moldavia
- Reign: September 1434 – 13 July 1447
- Predecessor: Iliaș of Moldavia
- Successor: Roman II of Moldavia
- Born: c. 1410
- Died: 13 July 1447
- Spouse: Maria
- Dynasty: Bogdan-Mușat
- Father: Alexander the Good
- Mother: Stanca
- Religion: Orthodox

Stephen II (or Ștefan II), (c. 1410 – 13 July 1447) was a Prince (Voivode) of Moldavia. He ruled alone between September 1434 and August 1435, jointly with Iliaș of Moldavia from August 1435 to May 1443, alone from May 1443 to May 1444, in association with his brother Petru from May 1444 to 1445, and alone until July 1447.

== Life ==
He was the son of Alexander the Good and a concubine, Stanca. He deposed his brother Iliaș I with the assistance several boyars and of the Wallachian Prince Vlad II Dracul. In exchange for Pokuttya the Poles, to whom Iliaș had pledged his allegiance, also recognised him, and King Władysław III agreed to capture Iliaș and hold him in prison.

Iliaș was eventually freed in 1435, and returned at the head of an army, engaging his brother in several battles; the indecisive one in Podraga or Podagra (the present-day village of Podriga in Drăgușeni) brought Władysław III's mediation: an agreement was reached for Stephen and Iliaș to share the throne, with Stephen as ruler over the southeastern part of Moldavia, in Tecuci, Kilia, Vaslui, and Covurlui.

In 1443, Iliaș breached their agreement, and Stephen caught him and gouged out his eyes. Blinded, Iliaș sought refuge in Poland, while Stephen remained prince, taking as his associate an illegitimate brother, Petru II. He was killed in 1447 by the son of Iliaș, Roman II, who had ensured Polish support during his refuge in Pokuttya.

Preceded by Iliaș	Prince/Voivode of Moldavia; 1434–1447 jointly with Iliaș 1435–1443 with Petru III 1444–1445	Succeeded by Roman II

== See also ==
Ancestors of Stephen II of Moldavia

8. Costea of Moldavia
4. Roman I of Moldavia
2. Alexander I of Moldavia
5. Margareta Mușata
1. Stephen II of Moldavia
3. Stana
