= Neamț Monastery =

Romanian Orthodox monastery settlement

Coordinates: 47°15′49″N 26°12′33″E

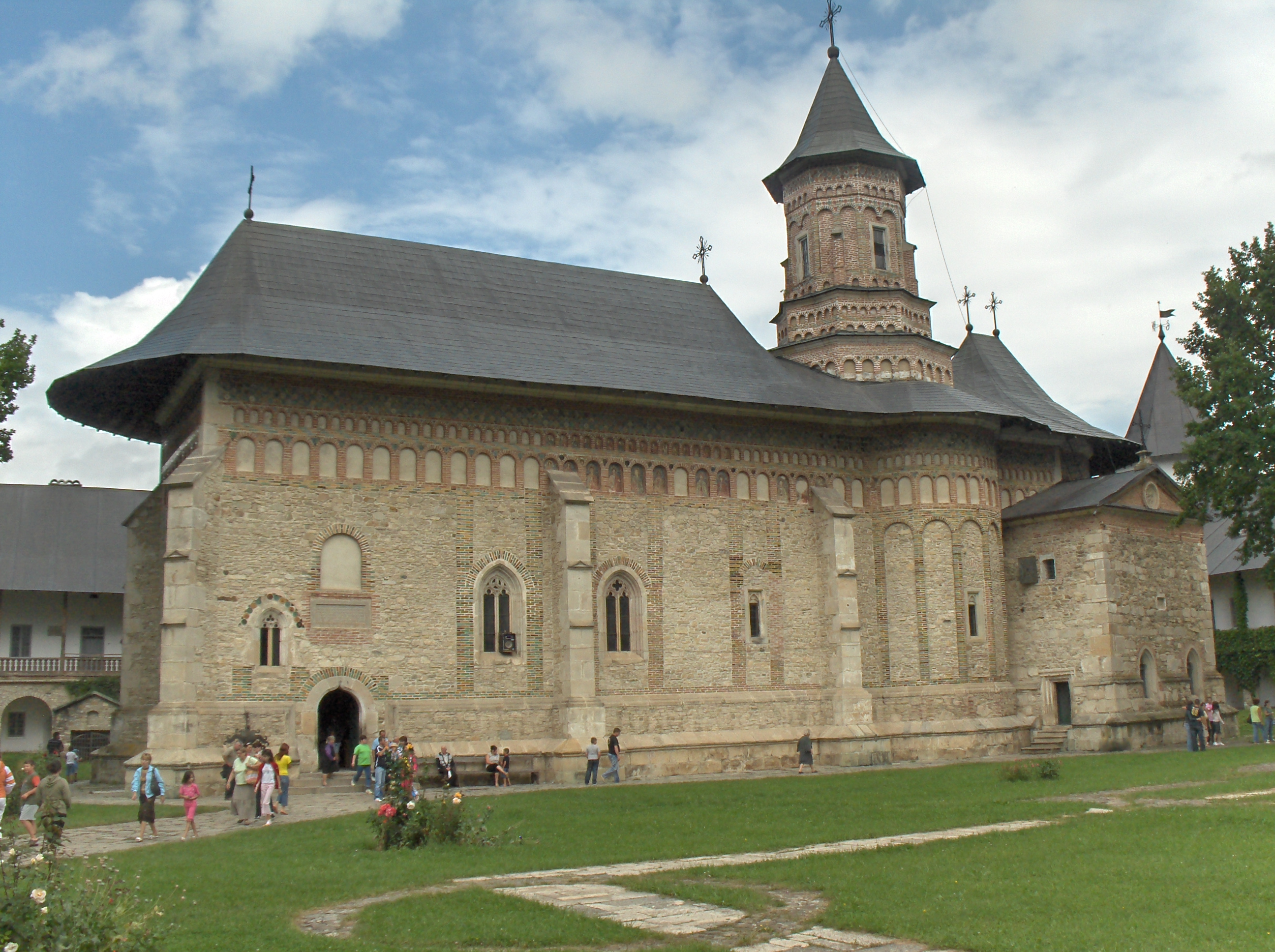
The 14th-century church

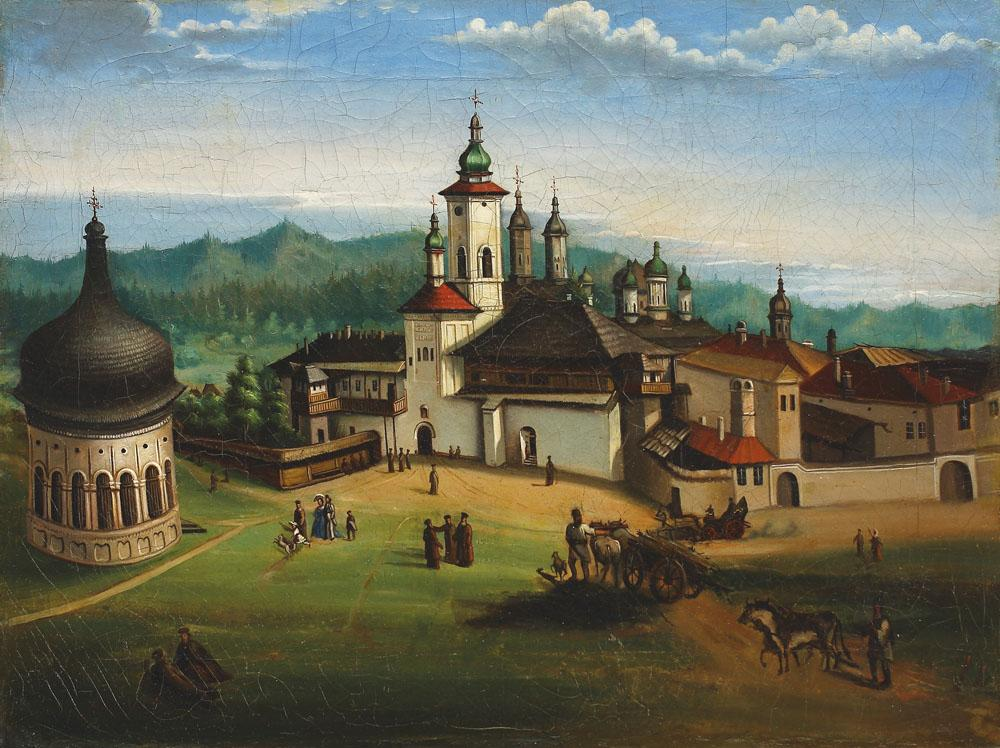
The Neamț Monastery, 19th-century painting by Gheorghe Șiller

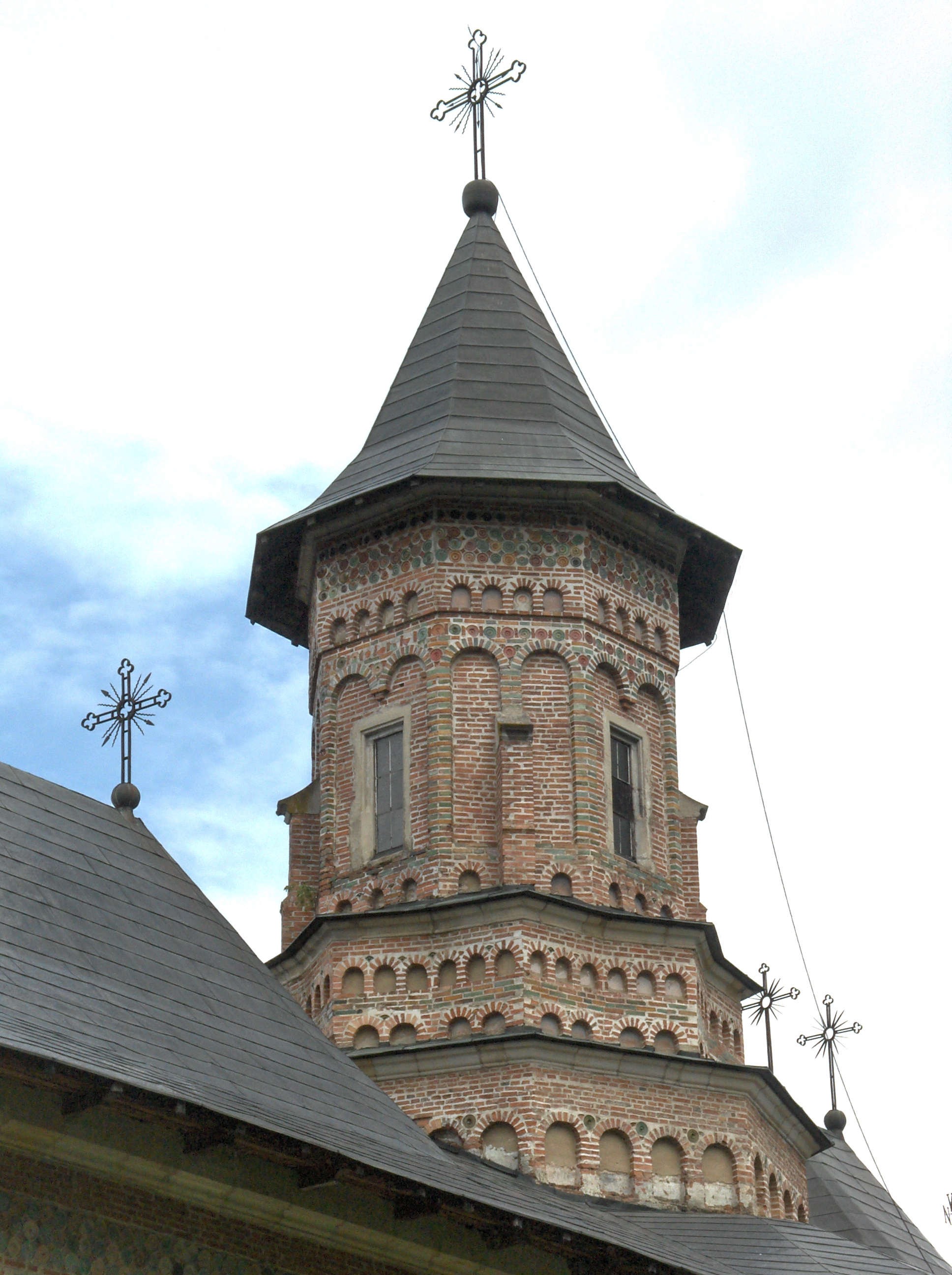
Detail of the tower church

The Neamț Monastery (Romanian: Mănăstirea Neamț) is a Romanian Orthodox religious settlement, one of the oldest and most important of its kind in Romania. It was built in the 15th century, and it is an example of medieval Moldavian architecture. A jewel of 15th-century architecture, the church was built during the reign of Stephen III of Moldavia (1457–1504) and finished in the year when the Moldavian army won the battle against King John I Albert of Poland (1497).

== Location ==
The monastery is located in the north-eastern part of Romania, in Neamț County, 10 km west of Târgu Neamț. It is accessible by car (DN 15B road) and train (Târgu Neamț railway station); the nearest airport is Suceava, located about 60 km to the north.

== Architecture ==
Sumptuous, with delicate colour effects, the monastery shows the maturity of the Moldavian architectonic style, which matured during Ștefan cel Mare's period. The façade of the church is covered with decorations characteristic of that time: Gothic windows and friezes with enameled disks, coloured in green, yellow and brown.

In the chamber of the tombs, which appear for the first time at this church, is the tomb of Ștefan al II-lea, son of Alexandru cel Bun and uncle of Ștefan cel Mare.

== Manuscripts and art ==
The art treasures kept at Neamț Monastery are proof of the intense artistic and cultural activity which took place here through the centuries. Here Gavril Uric showed his talent, the most important representative of the Moldavian miniature from the 15th century. His first known manuscript, dated 1429, is kept in the Bodleian Library at the University of Oxford. The calligraphers and miniaturists of Ștefan cel Mare who worked at this important center made many of the books given to Putna Monastery. In the cells of the monastery, the chronicler Macarie wrote the chronicle of Petru Rareș's rule, and Eftimie the chronicle of Alexandru Lăpușneanu's rule.

The learned tradition of the Neamț Monastery disappeared in the 17th and 18th centuries, to be reborn at the beginning of next century, when Metropolitan Veniamin Costachi established a printing house here. In the monastery museum is the old printing press, which was used to print books since 1807. The monastery's library is said to be more than 600 years old. Among the almost 11,000 volumes are many rare books, some being the first ones printed in this country. The altar screen of the former church from Neamț Fortress, is the most important treasure of all those in the monastery, along with the icon painted by Nicolae Grigorescu, "The Flight from Egypt".

== Gallery ==
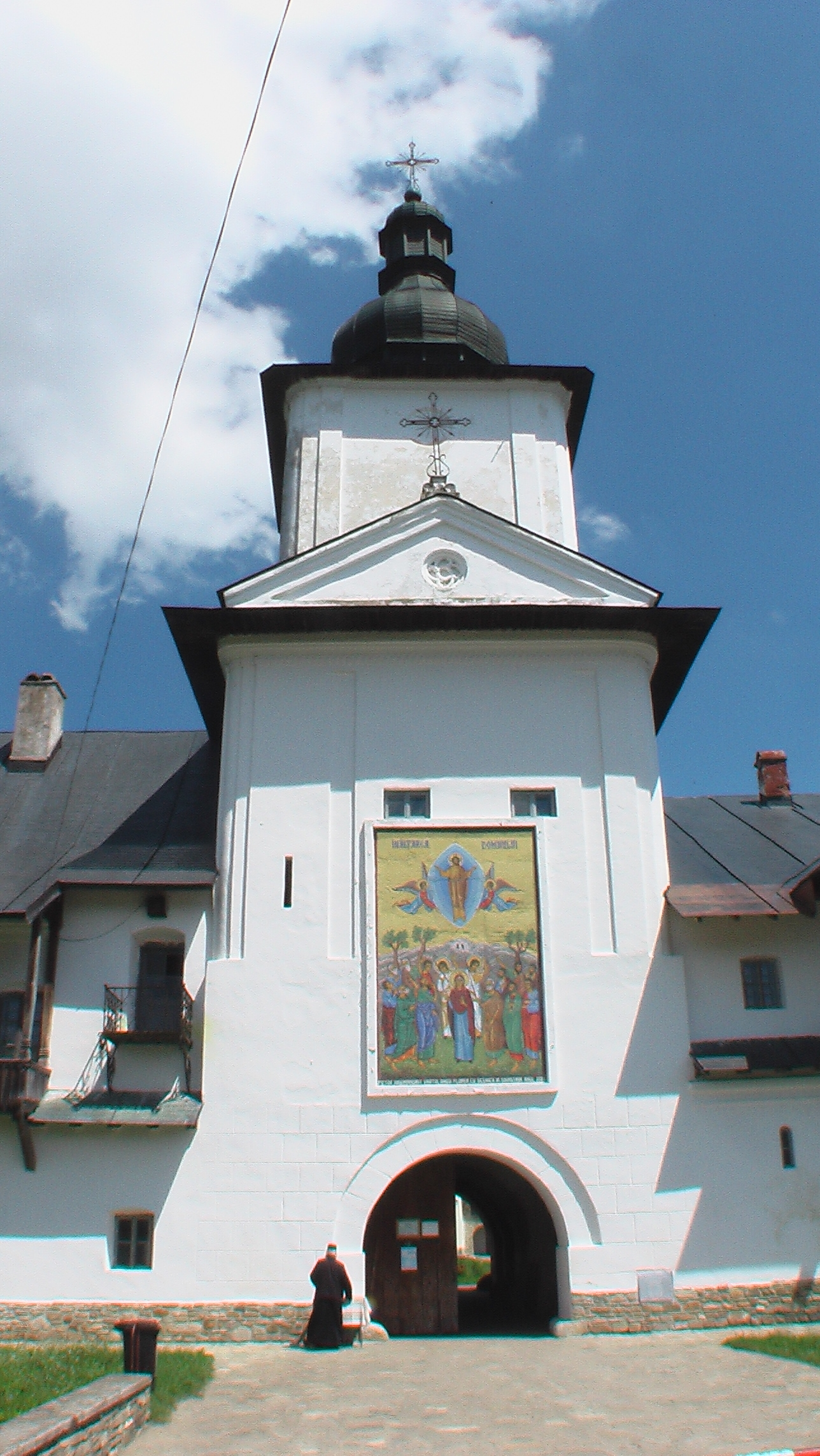

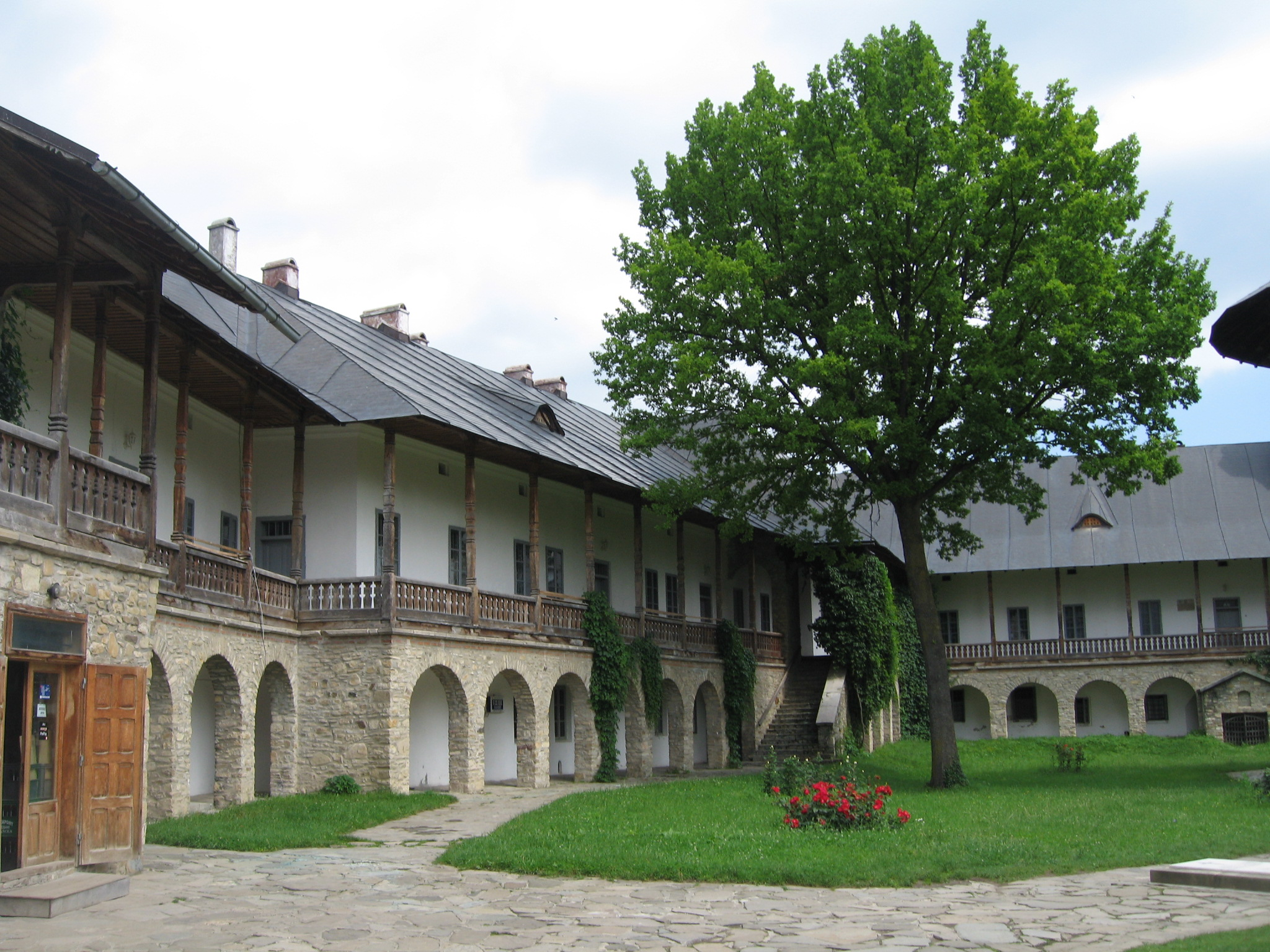

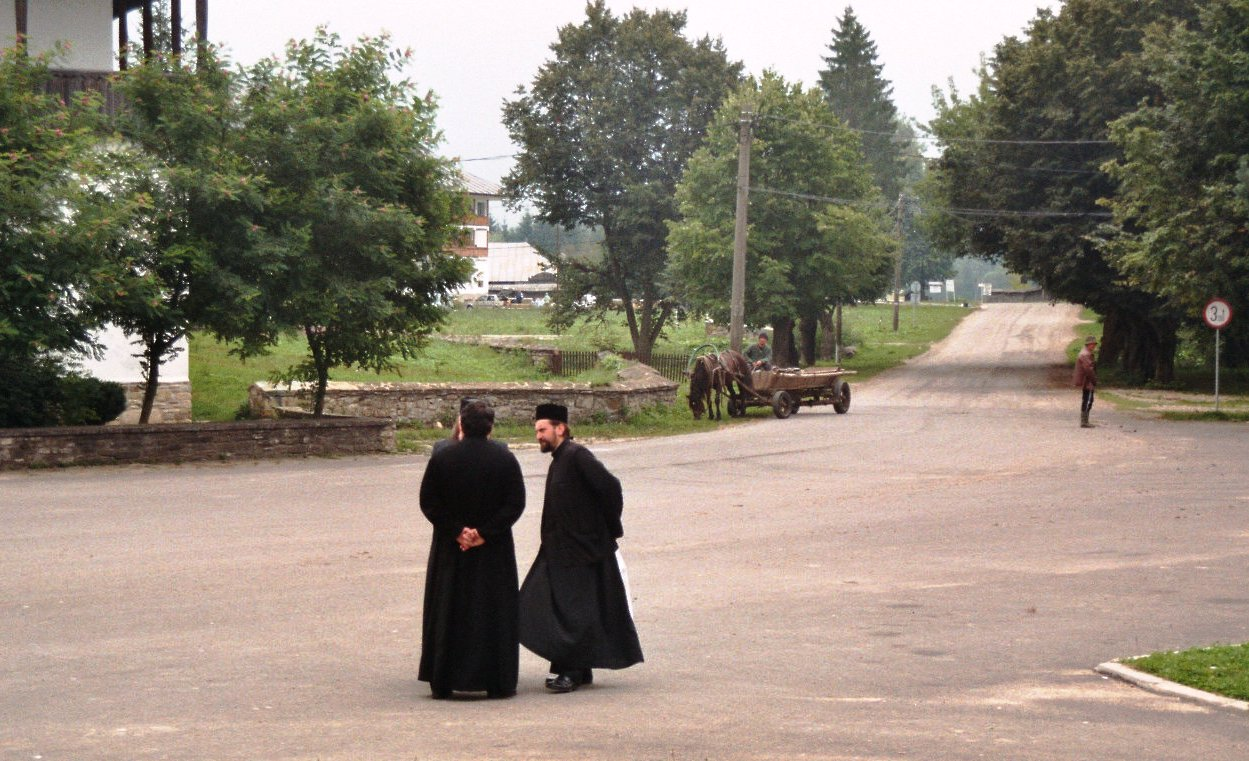

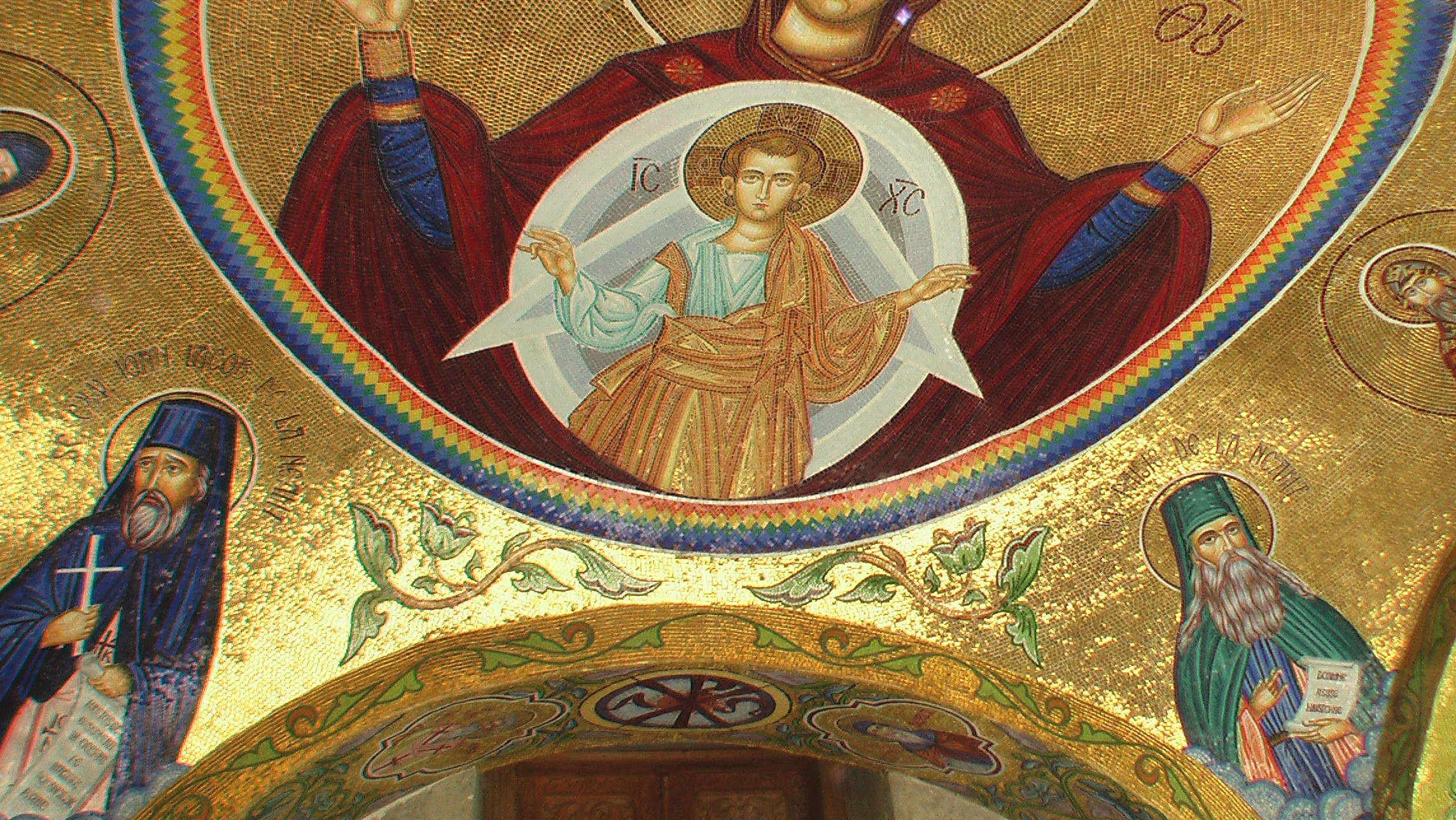

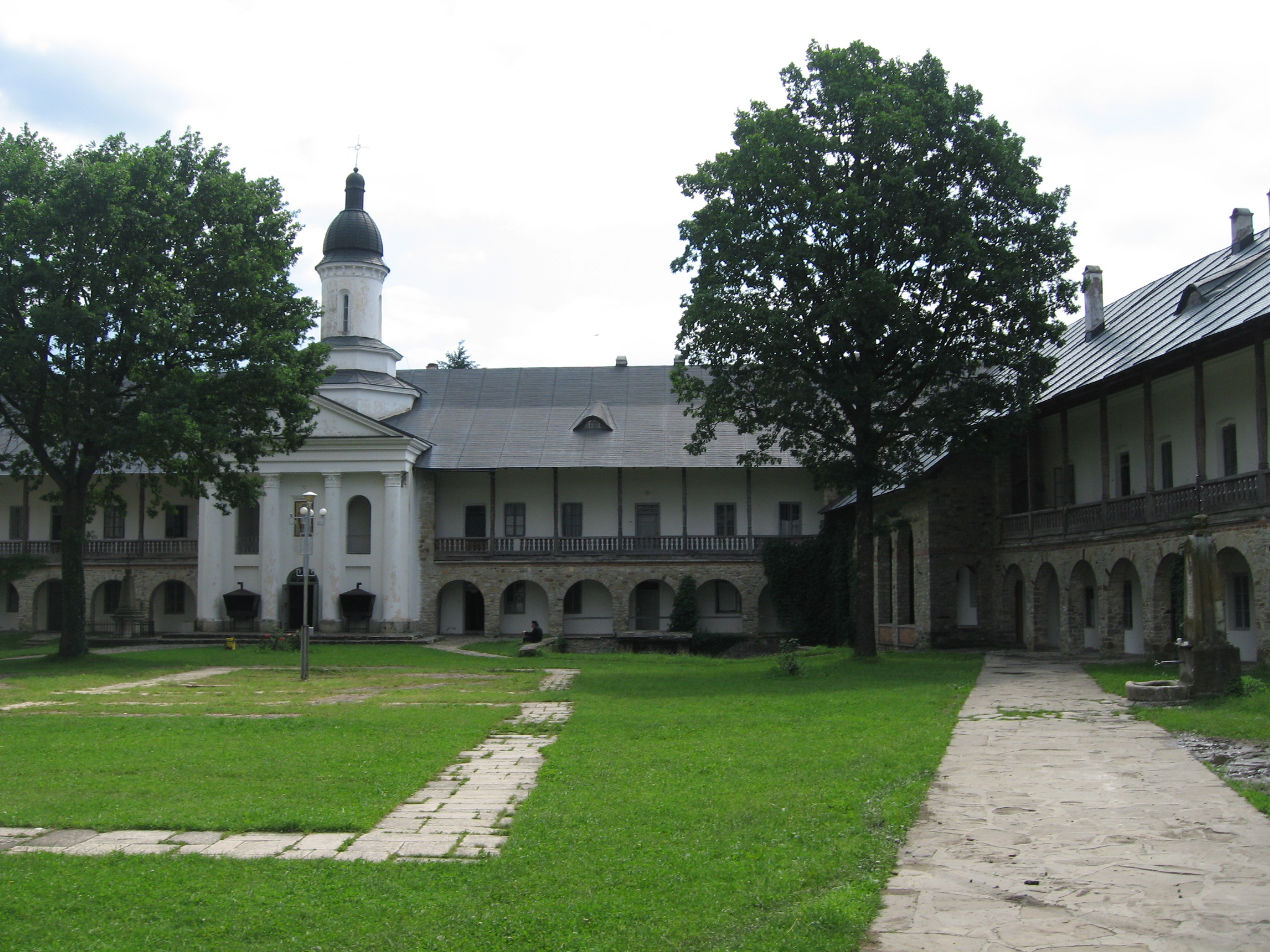

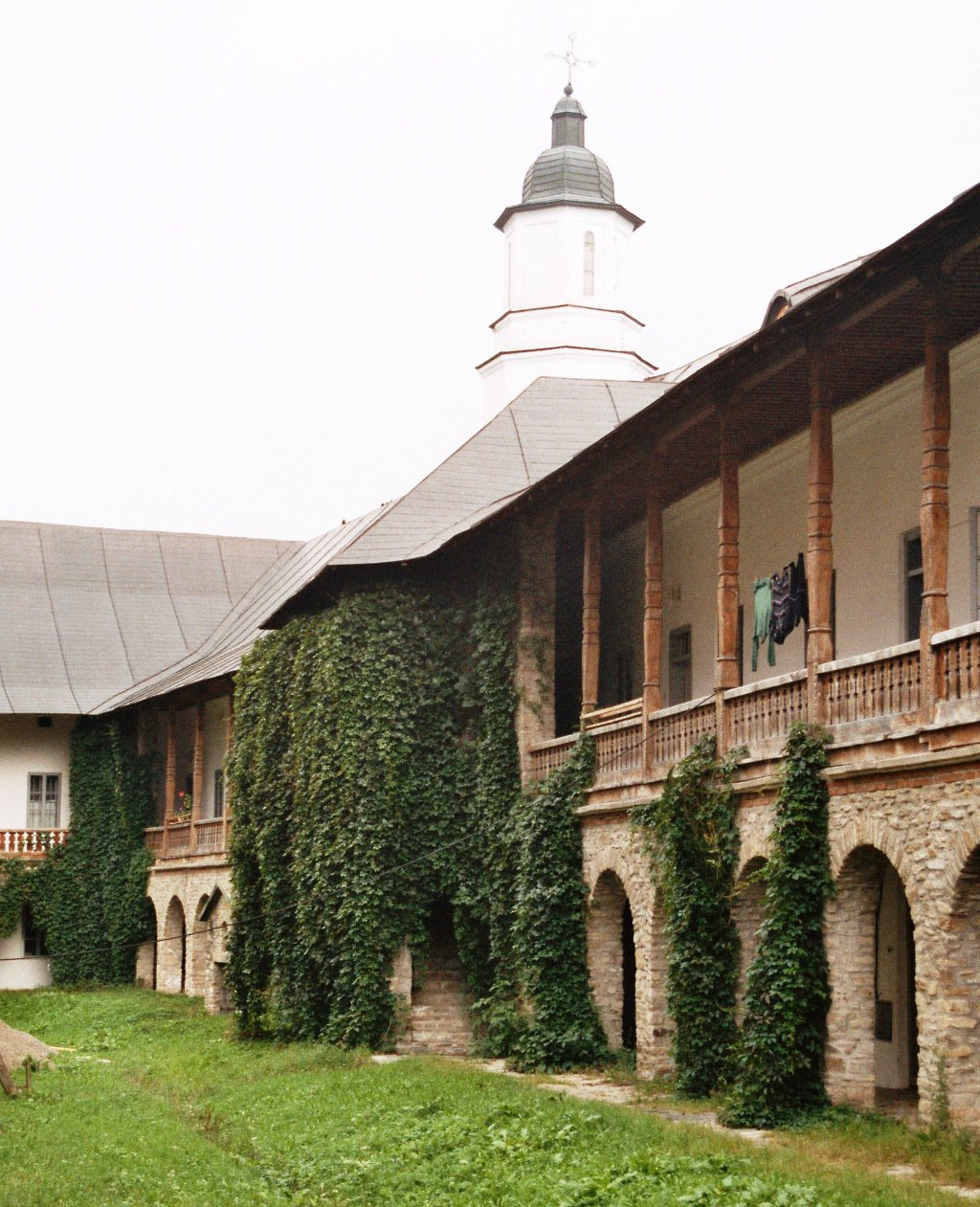

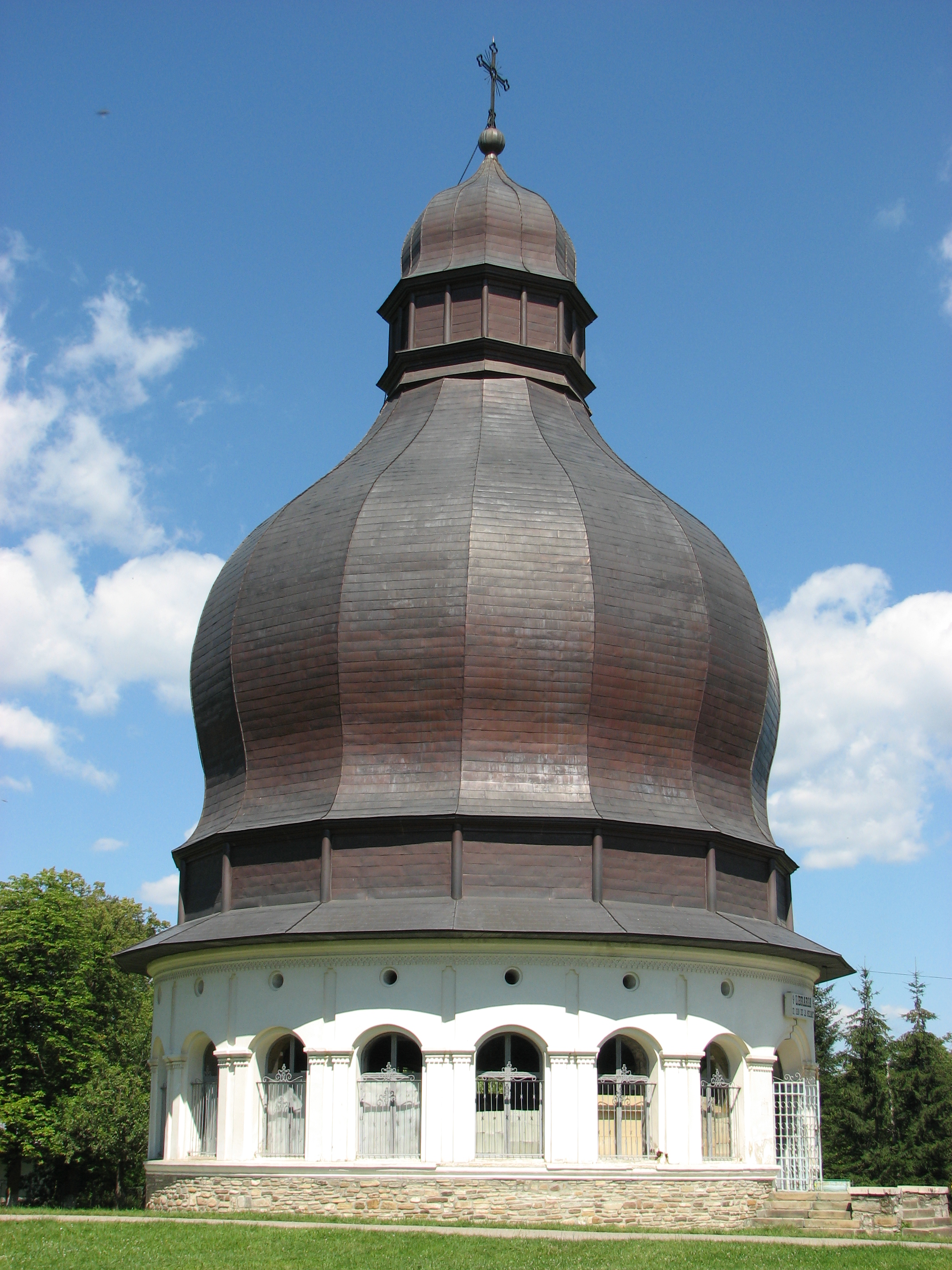

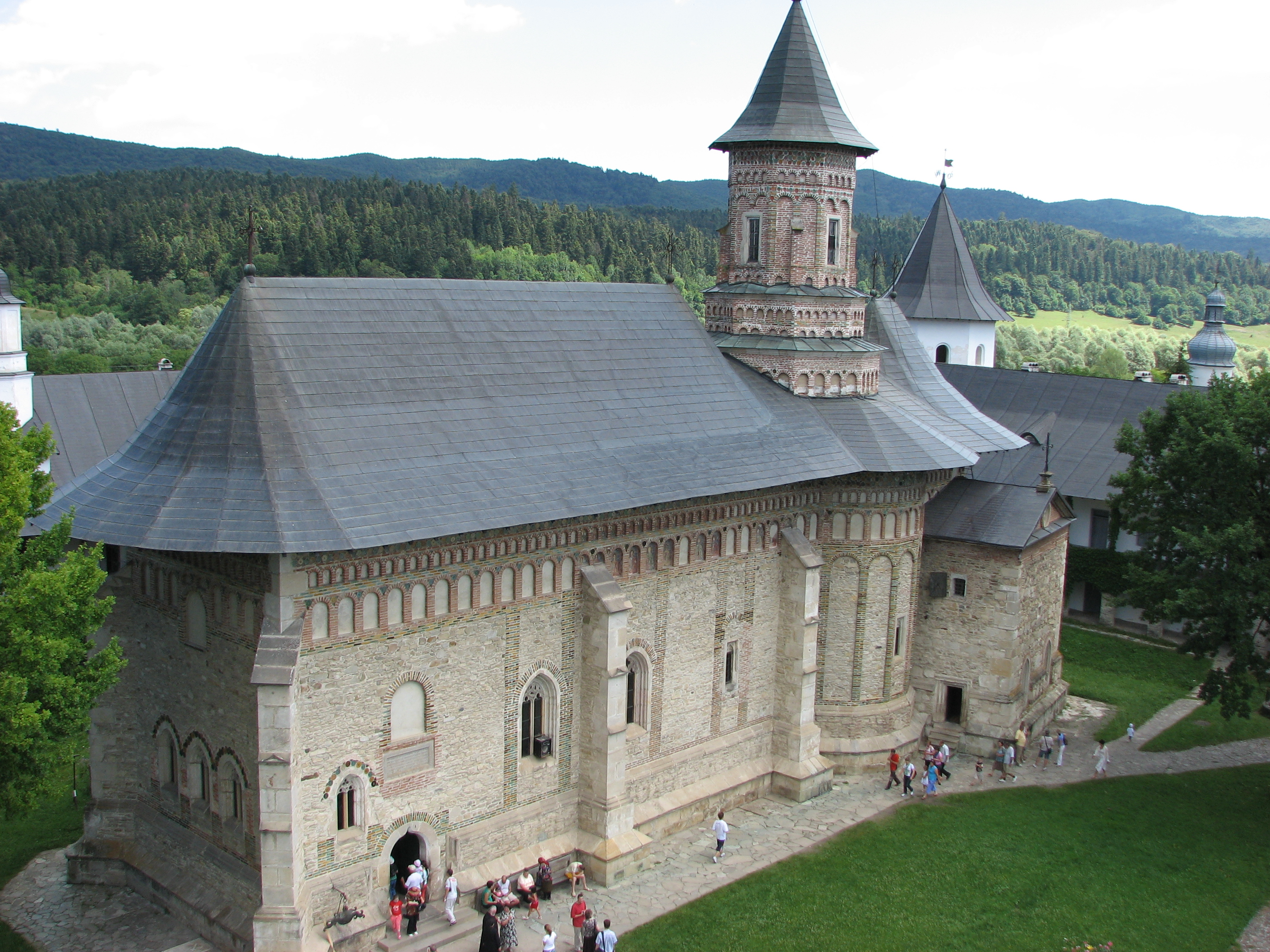

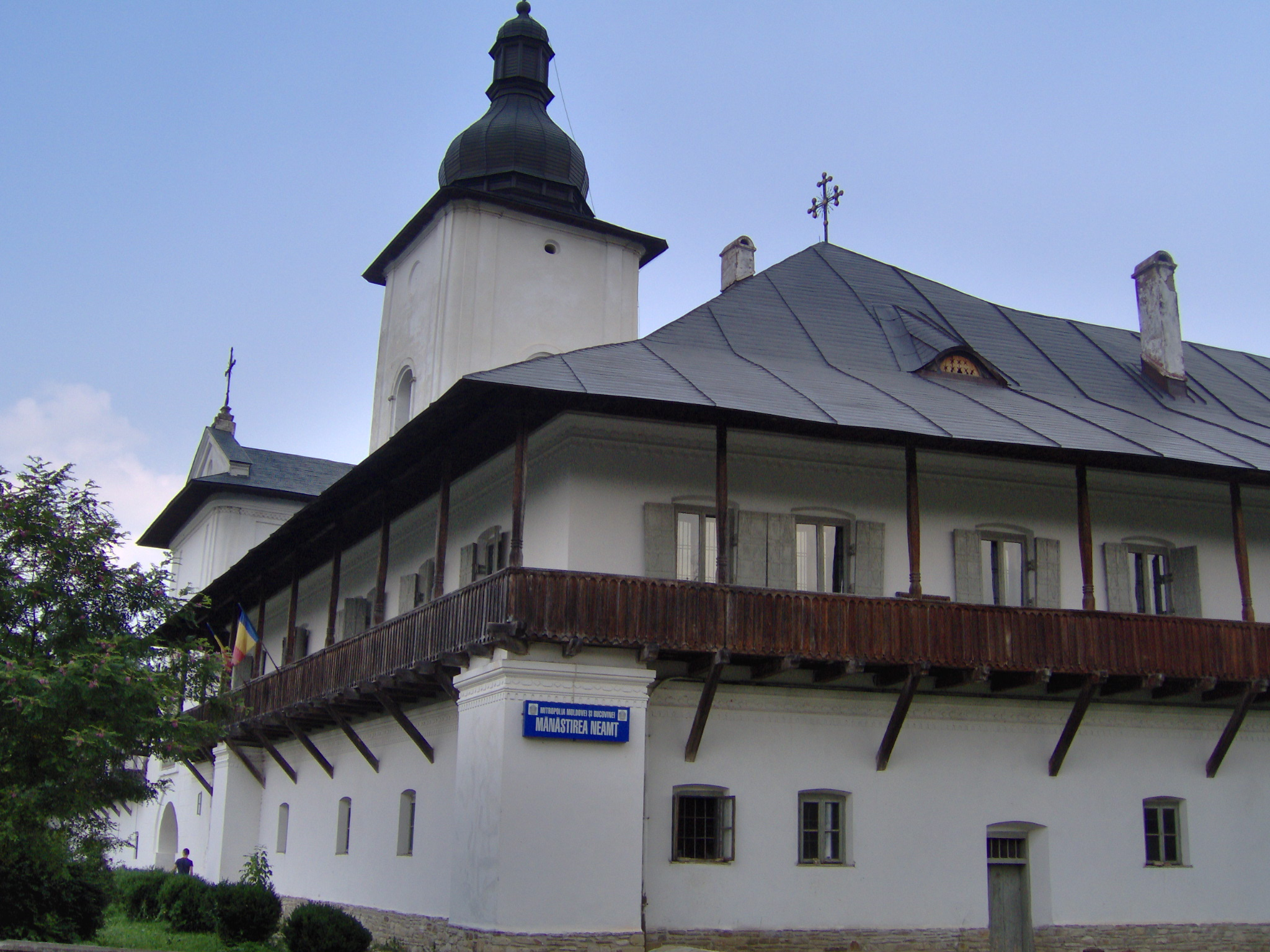
