= Alexander III the Bad =

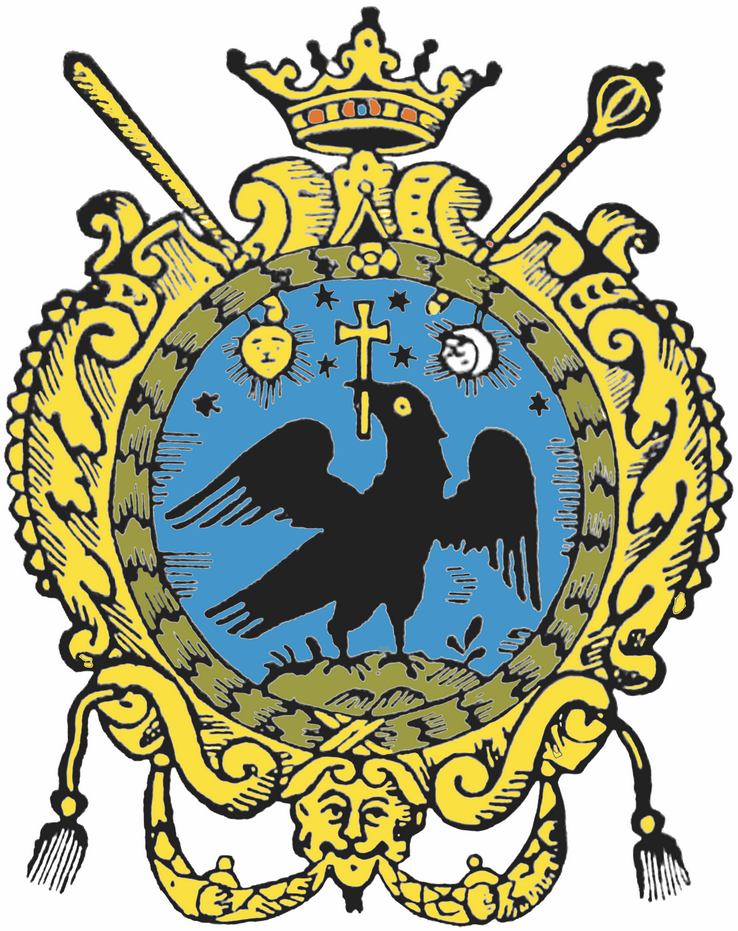
- Wallachian Coat of Arm

Prince of Wallachia
- Reign: August/November 1592 – September 1593
- Predecessor: Ștefan Surdul
- Successor: Michael the Brave
- Born: c. 1570
- Died: 20 March 1597
- Issue: Petru
- Dynasty: Bogdan-Mușat
- Father: Bogdan Lăpușneanu
- Religion: Orthodox

Alexander III, commonly known as Alexander III the Bad (Romanian: Alexandru III cel Rău; died 20 March 1597) was the Prince of Wallachia between November 1592 and 1593. He was the son of Bogdan Lăpușneanu, former Prince of Moldavia. Although Alexandru had in his government both local Boyars and Greeks, complaints arose to the Ottoman Empire in June 1593 accusing the Prince of behaving like a tyrant just like his uncle, Prince of Moldavia, Aaron the Tyrant.

He married the widow of Petru Cercel, which politically was not a favourable choice as the Cantacuzino family was better regarded by the Ottomans. On 2–12 September 1593, Mihai Viteazu was chosen as the new Prince of Wallachia. Alexander was exiled to Constantinople, where he was accused of conspiracy against the Sublime Porte and executed by strangulation on 20 March 1597.

Alexander had a son Petru, who died on 8 June 1619.

Ștefan Surdul House of Bogdan-Mușat Died: 1597
Regnal titles
Preceded by Ștefan Surdul	Voivode of Wallachia; 1592–1593	Succeeded by Michael the Brave
