= Peter III of Moldavia =

Peter III

Prince of Moldavia (1st reign)
- Reign: May 1444 – 1445
- Predecessor: Stephen II of Moldavia
- Successor: Stephen II of Moldavia

Prince of Moldavia (2nd reign)
- Reign: 13 July – 15 September 1447
- Predecessor: Stephen II of Moldavia
- Successor: Roman II of Moldavia

Prince of Moldavia (3rd reign)
- Reign: 23 February 1448 – October 1448
- Predecessor: Roman II of Moldavia
- Successor: Ciubăr Vodă - Csupor de Monoszlo
- Born: unknown
- Died: 1452
- Dynasty: Bogdan-Mușat
- Father: Alexandru cel Bun
- Religion: Orthodox

Peter III (Romanian: Petru III; c. 1422 – 1452) was hospodar and voivode of Moldavia, and son of Alexandru cel Bun. He is traditionally believed to be the second ruler of Moldavia bearing this regnal name, though some historians (based on a Polish chronicle) have posited another Petru had ruled Moldavia in the late 14th century, making him the third Petru(Peter) in regnal order.

He co-ruled Moldavia with his brother, Stephen II of Moldavia, during 1444–1445, in 1447–1448 with Roman II of Moldavia, and in February – October 1448 alone. He came to power to his first and last rules with help from Hungary's Governor General John Hunyadi. According to Polish chronicler Jan Duglosz, Petru married in January 1448, when he was still 25 years of age, Hunyadi's older sister (name unknown) who was 50 years old at that time.

During his reign, a 3000 men cavalry contingent supported John Hunyadi's 1448 campaign, that ended with the second Battle of Kosovo (1448). Petru III also ceded fortress of Chilia/Kilija (nowadays Chilia Veche) to John Hunyadi.
