= Stephen I of Moldavia =

Stephen I
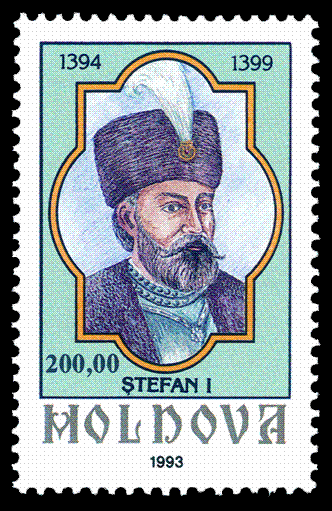

Voivode of Moldavia
- Reign: March 1394 – 1399
- Predecessor: Roman I
- Successor: Iuga
- Born: cca 1364
- Died: 1399
- Dynasty: Bogdan-Mușat
- Religion: Orthodox

Stephen I of Moldavia (Romanian: Ștefan I; 1364 – 1399) was Prince of Moldavia from 1394 to 1399. He succeeded to the throne as son of the previous ruler, Roman I and succeeded by his brother Iuga whom he associated to the throne in 1399 when he fell ill.

Stephen I's rule is notable for his victory at the Battle of Ghindăoani in February 1395 against king Sigismund I of Hungary who wished to assert his suzerainty over Moldavia (Stephen having had secured the support & agreed to be vassal of Jadwiga and Władysław II Jagiełło of Poland).

Stephen I is buried at Bogdana Monastery in Rădăuți, Romania next to his father Roman I, grandfather Costea & great-grandfather Bogdan I - the founder of independent Moldavia.

Preceded by Roman I of Moldavia	Prince of Moldavia; 1394–1399	Succeeded by Iuga of Moldavia
