= Peter II of Moldavia =

Prince of Moldavia

Peter II
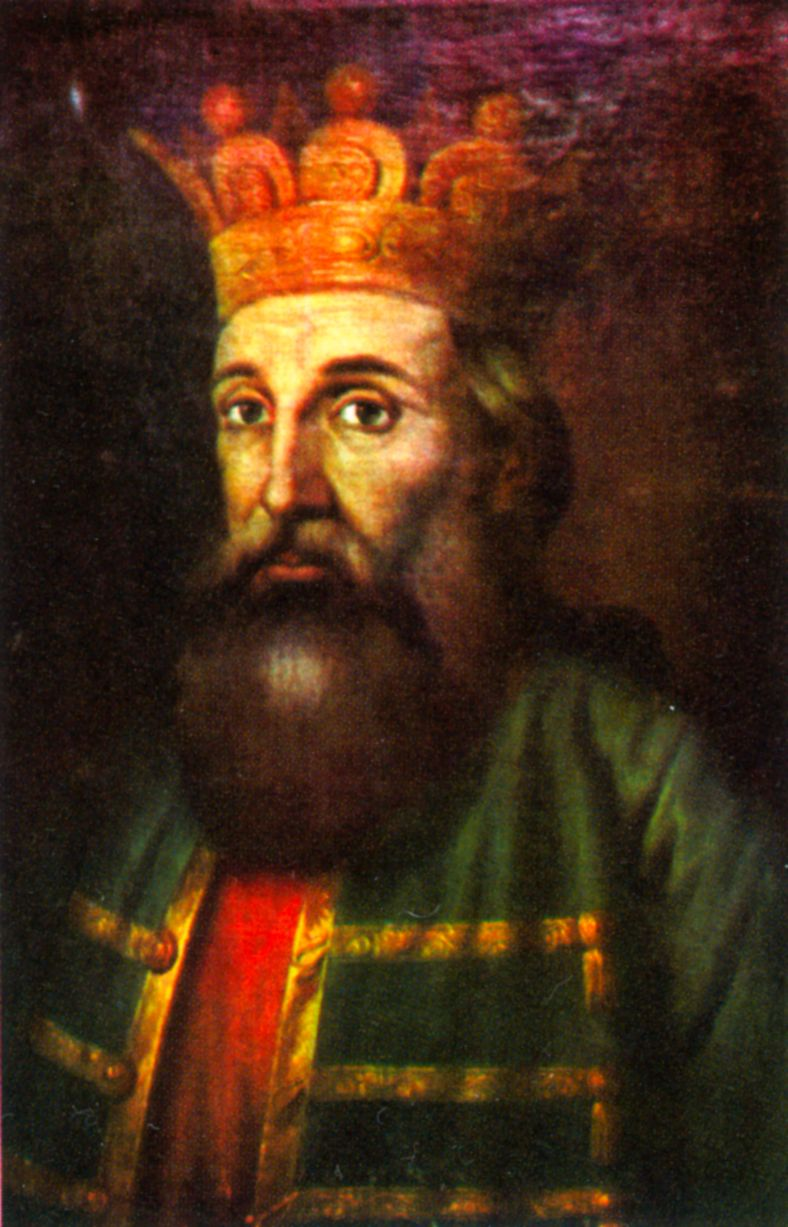

Voivode of Moldavia
- Reign: 1375–1391
- Predecessor: Lațcu
- Successor: Roman I
- Born: c. 1350
- Died: December 1391
- Dynasty: Bogdan-Mușat
- Father: Costea of Moldavia
- Mother: Margareta Muşata
- Religion: Orthodox

Petru (Peter) Mușat (d. 1391) was Voivode (prince) of Moldavia from 1375 to 1391, the maternal grandson of Bogdan I, the first ruler from the dynastic House of Bogdan, succeeding Lațcu, Bogdan's son and successor who converted to Catholicism. According to one significant hypothesis, he may have been the first voivode of Moldavia under this regnal name, and should be referred to as Petru I of Moldavia. After 2000, Romanian historian Constantin Rezachevici proposed a novel timeline of Moldavian rulers, according to which Petru Mușat would be referred as Petru II.

== Family ==
He was married twice. From his first wife he had a son, Roman. In 1388 he remarried to Olga, daughter of Janusz I, Prince of Masovia. From his second wife he had another son, Ivașcu.

== Reign ==
During his reign, he maintained good relationships with the king of Poland, Władysław II Jagiełło. On 27 September 1387 at Lwów, he paid homage to the Polish king, making Moldavia a Polish fief (which it remained until 1497). In 1388, he received Pokuttya as a pawn for 3,000 silver rubles he lent to the Polish king. Petru also acted as an intermediary in the negotiations between the Wallachian voivode Mircea the Elder and the Polish king that resulted in the treaties signed by the two parties in 1389 and 1390. The first Russian-Moldavian diplomatic contacts also date from his reign.

Petru founded the Suceava Citadel, the Neamț Citadel and Neamț Monastery, and built the Holy Trinity Church in Siret. He also fixed the princely seat of Moldova at Suceava in 1388, effectively dooming the Latin Diocese of Siret in the old capital, and maintained Orthodox Bishop Iosif at Cetatea Albă, contrary to the wishes expressed by the Patriarchate of Constantinople, resulting in his excommunication.

=== Coinage ===
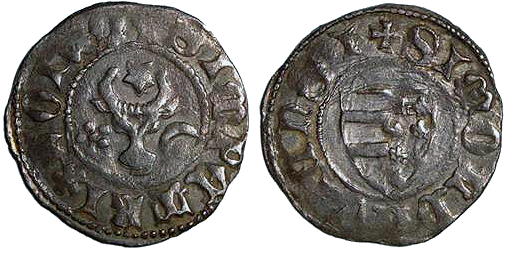
Coins of Peter II. The left one depicts the Moldavian bull's head, and the right one, the coat-of-arms of the House of Mușat (1375-1391).

During his reign, a number of important coins were minted; the ones attributed to him, known so far, are: groschen and far more rare half-groschen made of silver. Their design became the standard for coins minted by later Moldavian rulers.

Obverse: Aurochs head, frontal view, a star between the horns, a rose on the right, a crescent on the left. In some cases, the rose is at left and the crescent at right. Sometimes, the aurochs holds a fleur de lys in its mouth. The legend is in Latin: SIMPETRI WOIWOD.

Reverse: Coat of arms, a shield with three or four bars in the right half, and in the left half a variable number of fleurs de lys (seven to one). The legend is SIMOLDAVIENSIS.

Preceded by Costea	Prince/Voivode of Moldavia; 1375–1391	Succeeded by Roman I
