= Alexander the Good =

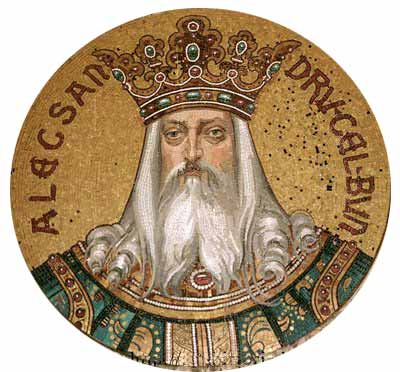
- Lithograph published by Dimitrie Papazoglu in 1891 after the fresco in the Cozia Monastery.

Voivode of Moldavia
- Reign: 23 April 1400 – 1 January 1432
- Predecessor: Iuga of Moldavia
- Successor: Iliaș of Moldavia
- Born: c. 1375
- Died: 1 January 1432 (aged 56–57); Suceava, Moldavia
- Spouse: Margareta Loszonc; Ana Neacșa; Rimgailė
- Issue: Iliaș; Petru III; Stephen II; Peter Aaron; Bogdan II
- Dynasty: Bogdan-Mușat
- Father: Roman I of Moldavia
- Religion: Eastern Orthodox
- Military career
- Branch: Moldavian military forces
- Conflicts: Tree list: Polish–Lithuanian–Teutonic War; Battle of Grunwald; Golub War; Battle of Marienburg (1422); Moldavian–Ottoman Wars; Alexander the Good's expedition to Podolia

Alexander I, commonly known as Alexander the Good (Romanian: Alexandru cel Bun; Romanian: [alekˈsandru t͡ʃel bun]; c. 1375 – 1 January 1432) was Voivode of Moldavia between 1400 and 1432. He was the son of Roman I and succeeded Iuga to the throne. As ruler he initiated a series of reforms while consolidating the status of the Principality of Moldavia.

== Reign ==
=== Internal politics ===
Alexander expanded the bureaucratic system by creating the "Council of the Voivode", the Chancellory and by adding (in 1403) the institution of Logofăt – Chancellor of the official Chancellery.

During his reign, he introduced new fiscal laws by adding commercial privileges to the traders of Lviv (1408) and Kraków (1409), improved the situation of trading routes (especially the one linking the port of Cetatea Albă to Poland), strengthened the forts by guarding them and expanded the Moldavian ports of Cetatea Albă and Chilia.

He also had a role in ending the conflict between the Moldavian Orthodox Church and the Patriarch of Constantinople. He built the Bistrița Monastery, where he is buried, and continued the building of the Neamț Monastery, which was started in the previous century.

Alexander made the first documented confirmation of gypsy slavery in Moldavia, giving Bistrița Monastery 31 gypsy families along with some cattle.

=== Foreign affairs ===
The main concern of Alexander the Good was to defend the country in wars against superior armies. In order to do that, he forged a system of alliances with Wallachia and Poland, generally against Hungary (although he had been backed to the throne by Sigismund of Hungary). In 1402, he was sworn vassal of Jogaila, the King of Poland. The treaty was renewed in 1404, 1407, 1411, and 1415.

Alexander won two major battles against the Teutonic Order: the Battle of Grunwald in 1410 and the Battle of Marienburg in 1422. In 1420, he also successfully defended Moldavia against the first incursion by the Ottomans at Cetatea Albă. He also got involved in the power struggles of Wallachia by helping Radu II Prasnaglava in 1418 to 1419 and helping Alexandru I Aldea in 1429, mostly in order to prevent the capture of Chilia.

Due to a territorial claim of Poland and the previous failure of the Polish king to fulfill his part of the vassalic treaty during an Ottoman attack in 1420, Alexander launched an attack on Poland during the Lithuanian Civil War. The attack ended with the Treaty of Suceava on 18 November 1431.

== Personal life ==
Alexander had a number of wives: Margareta Bánffy de Losoncz, Ana Jagiellon of Podolsk, Rimgailė (daughter of Kęstutis and sister of Vytautas the Great; divorced in 1421). He had several children, including Iliaș, Petru III, Stephen II, Peter Aaron, and Bogdan II.

He died on 1 January 1432 and was buried in Bistriţa Monastery.
