= Roman I of Moldavia =

Roman I
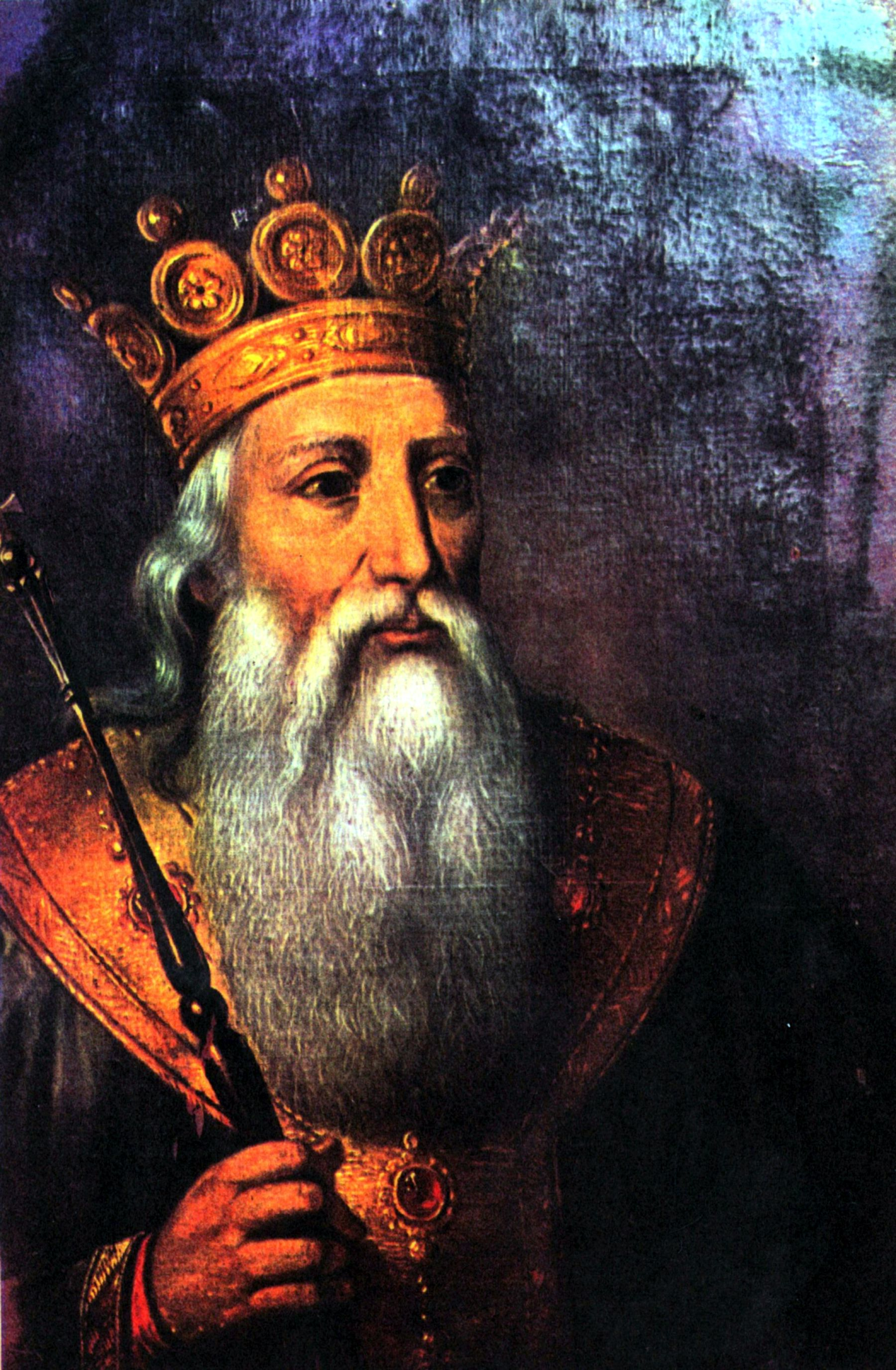

Voivode of Moldavia
- Reign: December 1391 – March 1394
- Predecessor: Peter II
- Successor: Stephen I
- Born: unknown
- Died: March 1394
- Spouse: Anastazja
- Dynasty: Bogdan-Mușat
- Father: Costea of Moldavia
- Religion: Orthodox

Roman I (died March 1394) was Voivode of Moldavia from December 1391 to March 1394. He was the second son of Costea and Margareta Muşata (= "the beautiful" in Old Romanian), the daughter of the first ruler of Moldavia, Bogdan I, and the founder of the Muşatin family.

During his reign, Moldova incorporated all the territories between the Carpathians and Dniester, with Roman I becoming the first Moldavian ruler to call himself "voivode from the [Carpathian] mountains to the [ Black Sea ] shore" or "Prince of Moldavia, from the Carpathian Mountains to the Sea." The important fortress of Cetatea Albă also came under Moldavian rule during that period.

Like the previous Moldavian rulers, he paid homage to the Polish king Władysław II Jagiełło. However, in 1393 he supported Fyodor Koriatovych, the prince of Podolia, in the war against Władysław II and Lithuanian grand duke Vytautas. After their defeat at Braclaw, Roman was forced to give up the throne in favour of his son Stephen I.

Roman I built the first church and fortifications in the town of Roman, which is considered to have been named in his honour.

He was interred in Bogdana Monastery, the princely church of Rădăuţi.

His wife was Anastasia. Some historians say she could be the sister of Mircea the Elder's mother. Others consider her the daughter of Lațcu of Moldavia - unlikely as Latcu's daughter would have been his first cousin.

Preceded by Petru I of Moldavia	Prince of Moldavia; 1391–1394	Succeeded by Stephen I of Moldavia
