= Costea of Moldavia =

Moldavian grand boyar

Costea was a Moldavian grand boyar, possibly briefly a Voivode of Moldavia, mentioned in a document from 1407 in line of rulers between Lațcu and Petru. Initially it has been thought that he ruled between 1373 and 1374.

Also he was believed by some to have been born in Wallachia, being probably related to Basarab I's ruling family. More recent studies including genetic testing have clarified that he is the father of voievodes Peter II (1375–1391) & Roman I (1392–1394).

He was married to Margareta (Mușata), a Roman Catholic. They had several children: Petru, Roman, all of them ruling in succession after Lațcu's death (Margareta's brother).

In a document from 1392 it is said that his wife, Margareta Mușata, the daughter of Bogdan I, the founder of the House of Bogdănești (or Mușat), built the Catholic church of Saint John the Baptist in the city of Siret, where she was interred. Costea is interred in St Nicholas Church of Bogdana Monastery in Rădăuți, Romania.
