= Stanojević =

Stanojević (Serbian Cyrillic: Станојевић, pronounced [stanǒːjeʋitɕ]) is a Serbian patronymic surname derived from the male given name Stanoje. Notable people with the surname include:

- Aleksandar Stanojević, Serbian football manager and former player
- Aca Stanojević Serbian politician in the time of interwar Yugoslavia
- Jovanka Stanojević, Serbian painter
- Marko Stanojevic, Italian rugby player
- Marko Stanojević, Serbian footballer
- Veljko Stanojević (1892–1967), Serbian painter
- Stanoje Stanojević (1874–1937), Serbian historian and academic
- Duško Stanojević, Serbian sprint canoer
- Obrad Stanojević, Serbian academic
- Miloš Stanojević (rower), Serbian rower
- Miloš Stanojević (footballer)

== See also ==
- Stanojevići
- Stanojković
- Stanojčić
