= Stanoje =

Stanoje (Cyrillic script: Станоје) is a South Slavic masculine given name.

It have rise to a number of patronymic surnames, such as Stanojević, Stanojković, Stanojčić.

Notable people with the surname include:

- Stanoje Glavaš (1763–1815), Serbian military commander
- Stanoje Jocić (born 1932), Serbian footballer
- Stanoje Stanojević (1874–1937), Serbian historian

== See also ==
- Stanojević
- Stanojevići
