= List of former capitals of Serbia =

This is a list of the historical capitals of Serbian statehood:

Capital	Timeline	Notes
Ras	?–960	capital of the Serbian Principality under the Vlastimirović dynasty.
Ras	fl. 969–976	capital of the Byzantine Catepanate of Ras.
Sirmium	ca. 1018–1071	capital of the Byzantine Theme of Sirmium.
Stari Ras	ca. 1050–1148	capital of the Principality of Duklja under the Vojislavljević dynasty.
Stari Ras	ca. 1083–1166	capital of the Serbian Grand Principality under the Vukanović dynasty.
Bele Crkve	1166–1168	First capital of the Serbian Grand Principality under Stefan Nemanja.
Niš	ca. 1183–1191	capital of the Serbian Grand Principality under Stefan Nemanja.
Deževo, Debrc and Belgrade	1276–1282	capitals of Stefan Dragutin's Kingdom in Syrmia.
Skopje	1282–1321	capital of King Stefan Milutin.
Prizren	1300–1345	first capital of King Stefan Dušan.
Skoplje	1345–1371	first capital of Serbian Empire of Stefan Dušan and later Stefan Uroš V.
Serres	1345–1355	second capital of Serbian Empire of Stefan Dušan.
Kruševac	1371–1402	capital of Moravian Serbia under Lazar Hrebeljanović.
Vučitrn	1371–1402	capital of District of Branković under Vuk Branković.
Prilep	1371–1395	capital of Lordship of Prilep under Marko Mrnjavčević.
Belgrade	1404–1430	capital of Serbian Despotate under Stefan Lazarević.
Smederevo	1430–1459	capital of Serbian Despotate under the Branković dynasty.
Belgrade	1718–1739	capital of the Habsburg Kingdom of Serbia (1718–39).
Topola	1805–1813	capital of Revolutionary Serbia under Karadjordje, during the First Serbian Uprising.
Smederevo	1806	temporary capital of serbia under Karadjordje and seat of Praviteljstvujušči Sovjet (government headed by Dositej Obradović).
Gornja Crnuća	1815–1818	capital of Revolutionary Serbia under Miloš Obrenović, during the Second Serbian Uprising
Kragujevac	1818–June 12, 1839	capital of the Principality of Serbia under Miloš Obrenović.
Belgrade	June 12, 1839–June 1840	capital of the Principality of Serbia under Mihailo Obrenović III.
Kragujevac	June 1840 – 1841	capital of the Principality of Serbia under Mihailo Obrenović III.
Belgrade	April 25, 1841 – 1915	capital of the Principality of Serbia and Kingdom of Serbia (1882–1918).
Temišvar	1849–1860	capital of the Voivodeship of Serbia and Banat of Temeschwar (1849–1860).
Niš	July 1914–October 1915	capital of Serbia during Austro-Hungarian occupation of Belgrade (World War I). From 1878 onwards, it was treated as the "second capital".
Belgrade	1916–present	capital of the Kingdom of Serbia, Kingdom of Yugoslavia (1918–1943), Socialist Federal Republic of Yugoslavia (1945–1992), Serbia and Montenegro (1992–2006), and Serbia (2006–)

== See also ==
- Serbia
- History of Serbia
