= Art Athina =

Art Athina is an annual international contemporary art fair that takes place in Athens, Greece. It was organized for the first time in 1993, making it one of the oldest contemporary art fairs in Europe.

Art Athina is organized by the Greek Hellenic Art Galleries Association (PSAT) as a way for galleries to showcase their artists and gallery owners to interact and network. The 14th annual event in 2008 attracted over 18,000 visitors. The 2010 exhibition involves 58 galleries from 11 countries.

The fair played a decisive role in the creation of the art market in Greece.

== Related pages ==
- Jovanka Stanojević
