= History of Serbia =

The history of Serbia covers the historical development of Serbia and of its predecessor states, from the Early Stone Age to the present state, as well as that of the Serbian people and of the areas they ruled historically. Serbian habitation and rule has varied much through the ages, and as a result the history of Serbia is similarly elastic in what it includes.

After early Slavs first appeared in the Balkans in the 6th and 7th centuries, they mixed with local Byzantine subjects, descendants of Paleo-Balkan tribes, such as the Thracian, Dacian, Roman, Illyrian and former Roman colonists. The First Serbian Principality was established in the 8th century by the Vlastimirovići dynasty ruling over modern-day Montenegro, Bosnia, Dalmatia, and Serbia. It evolved into a Grand Principality by the 11th century, and in 1217 the Kingdom and national church (Serbian Orthodox Church) were established, under the Nemanjić dynasty. From the 14th century, an increasing number of Serbs migrated north to the Kingdom of Hungary, forming what would later become Serbian Vojvodina. In 1345 the Serbian Empire was established, spanning most of the Balkan peninsula. In 1540 Serbia became a part of the Ottoman Empire.

Serbian revolution against Ottoman rule in 1817 marked the birth of the Principality of Serbia, which achieved de facto independence in 1867 and gained full recognition by the Great Powers in the Berlin Congress of 1878. As a victor in the Balkan Wars of 1912–1913, Serbia regained Vardar Macedonia, Kosovo and Metohija and Raška. In late 1918, with the defeat of the Habsburg empire, Serbia was expanded to include regions of the former Serbian Vojvodina. Serbia was united with other Habsburg provinces into a pan-Slavic State of Slovenes, Croats and Serbs; the Kingdom of Serbia joined the union on 1 December 1918 and the country was named the Kingdom of Serbs, Croats and Slovenes.

Serbia achieved its current borders at the end of World War II, when it became a federal unit within the Federal People's Republic of Yugoslavia (proclaimed in November 1945). After the dissolution of Yugoslavia in a series of wars in the 1990s, Serbia once again became an independent state on 5 June 2006, following the breakup of a short-lived union with Montenegro.

== Prehistory ==
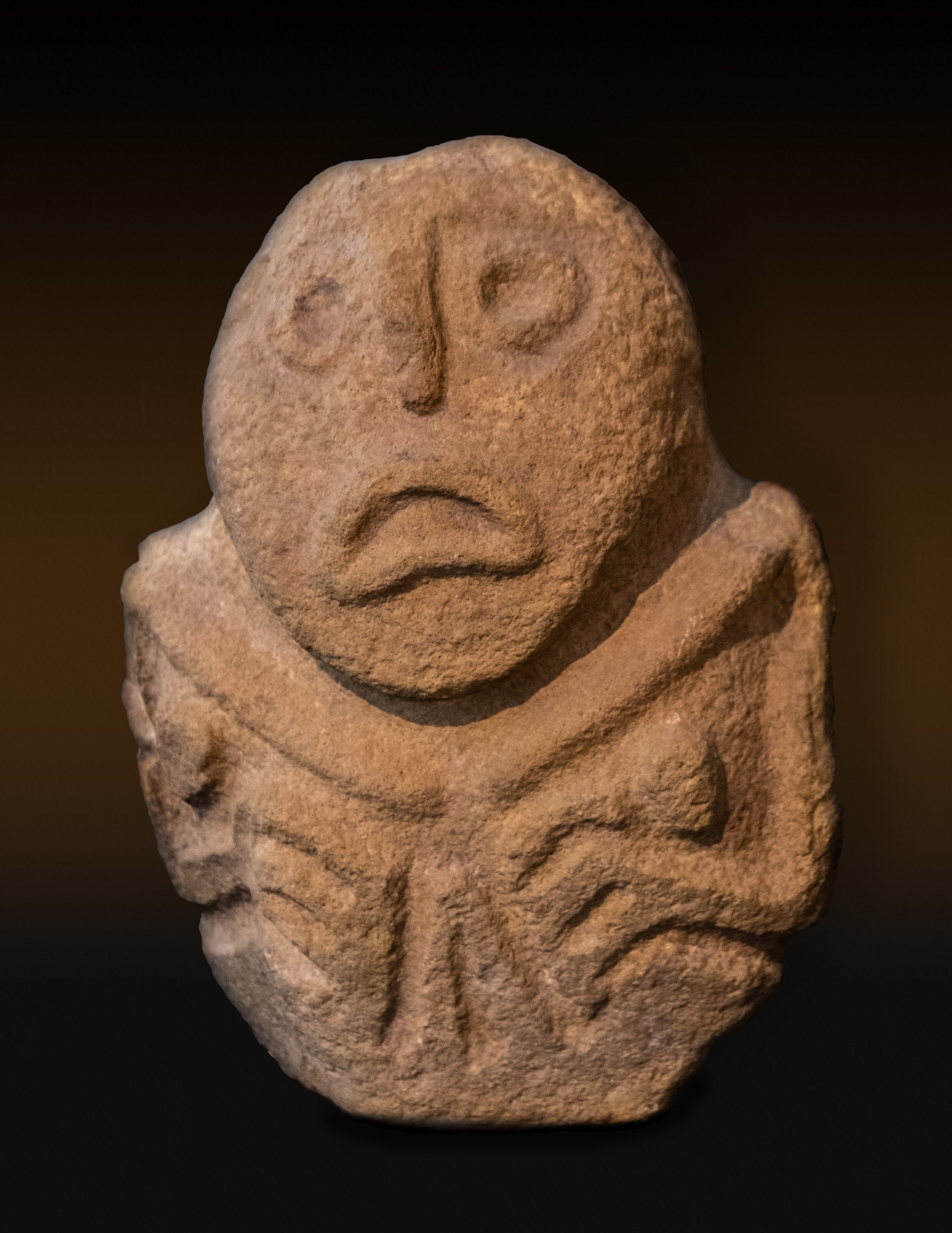
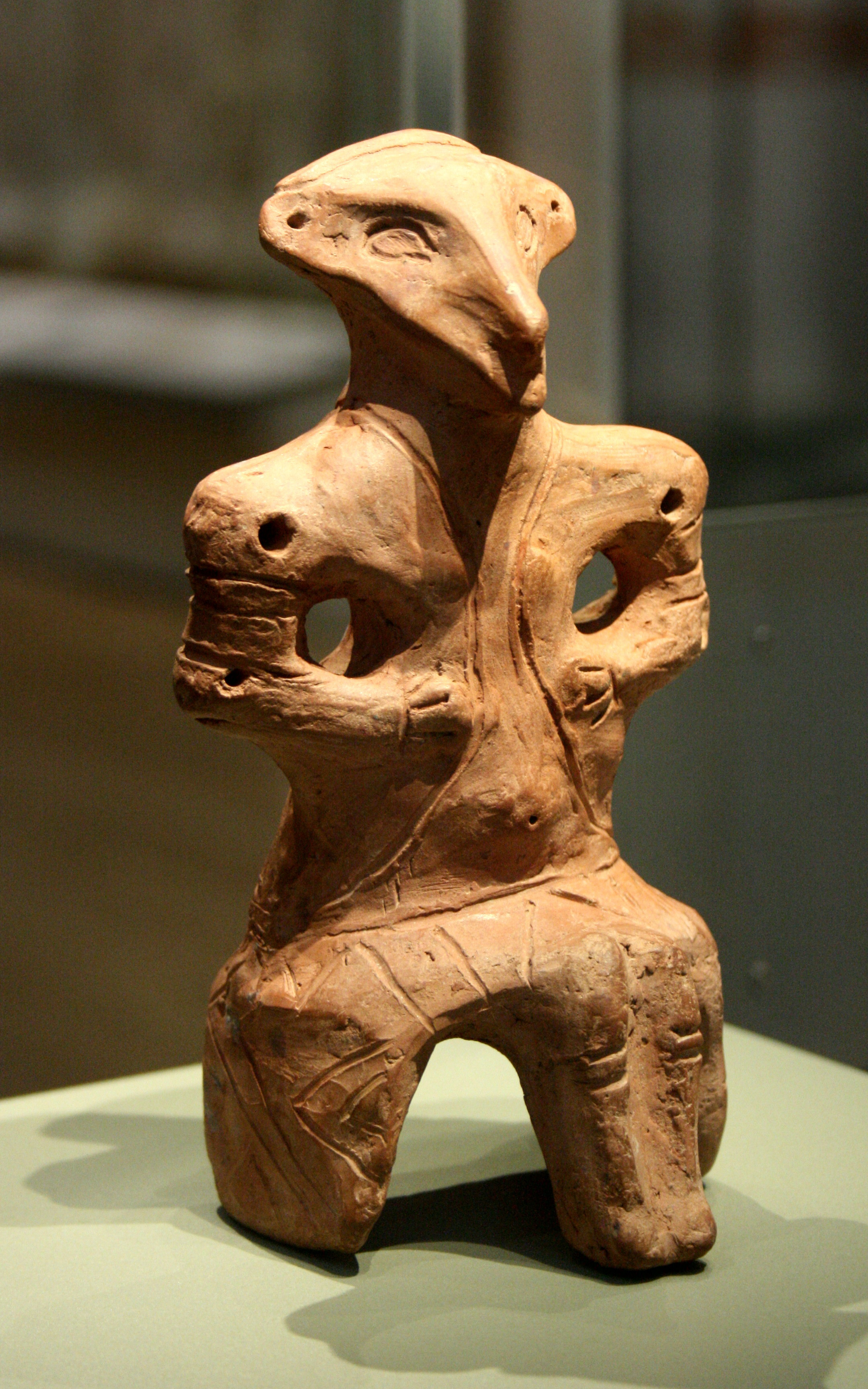
Left: Lepenski Vir culture figure, 7000 BC
Right: Vinča culture figure, 4000–4500 BC.

The Paleo-Balkan tribes formed in the 2nd and 1st millennia BC. The northernmost Ancient Macedonian city was in south Serbia (Kale-Krševica). The Celtic Scordisci tribe conquered most of Serbia in 279 BC, building many forts throughout the region. The Roman Empire conquered the region in the span of 2nd century BC – 1st century AD. The Romans continued the expansion of Singidunum (modern capital Belgrade), Sirmium (Sremska Mitrovica) and Naissus (Niš), among other centres, and a few remnants of monuments survive, such as Via Militaris, Trajan's Bridge, Diana Fortress, Felix Romuliana (UNESCO), etc. Northern parts were included in Moesia Superior, Dacia Remesiana and Dacia Mediterranea.

The Neolithic Starčevo and Vinča cultures existed in or near Belgrade and dominated the Balkans (as well as parts of Central Europe and Asia Minor) about 8,500 years ago. Some scholars believe that the prehistoric Vinča signs represent one of the earliest known forms of writing systems (dating to 6000–4000 BC).

Serbia's strategic location between two continents has subjected it to invasions by many foreign armies. The Thracians dominated Serbia before the Illyrian migration in the southwest. Greeks colonized the south in the 4th century BC, the northernmost point of the empire of Alexander the Great being the town of Kale.

== Roman era ==
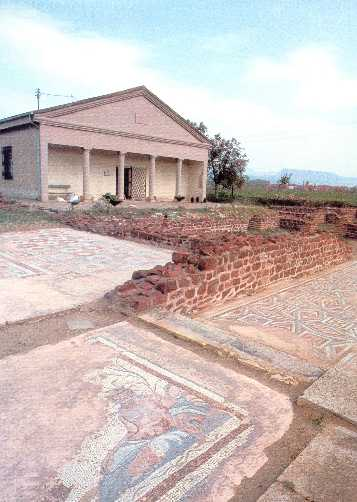
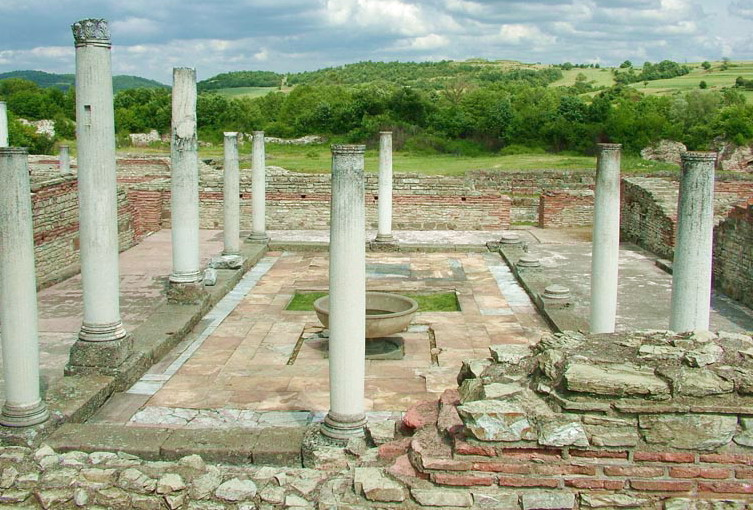
Left: Mediana, birthplace of Constantine the Great
Right: Gamzigrad, built by Emperor Galerius

The Romans conquered parts of modern-day Serbia in the 2nd century BC, in 167 BC when conquering the West, establishing the province of Illyricum and the rest of Central Serbia in 75 BC, establishing the province of Moesia. Srem was conquered by 9 BC and Bačka and Banat in 106 AD after the Trajan's Dacian Wars.

Contemporary Serbia comprises the classical regions of Moesia, Pannonia, parts of Dalmatia, Dacia and Macedonia. The northern Serbian city of Sirmium (Sremska Mitrovica) was among the top 4 cities of the late Roman Empire, serving as its capital during the Tetrarchy. The chief towns of Upper Moesia were: Singidunum (Belgrade), Viminacium (sometimes called municipium Aelium; modern Kostolac), Remesiana (Bela Palanka)

Seventeen Roman Emperors were born in present-day Serbia. Belgrade is believed to have been torn by 140 wars since Roman times.

By the early 6th century South Slavs, present throughout the Byzantine Empire in large numbers, merged with the native population (Celts, Dacians, Illyrians, Scythians, Thracians) and assimilated them, forming the base of the ethnogenesis of modern Serbs.

== Middle Ages ==
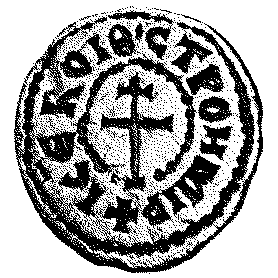
Seal of Prince Strojimir of Serbia, from the late 9th century

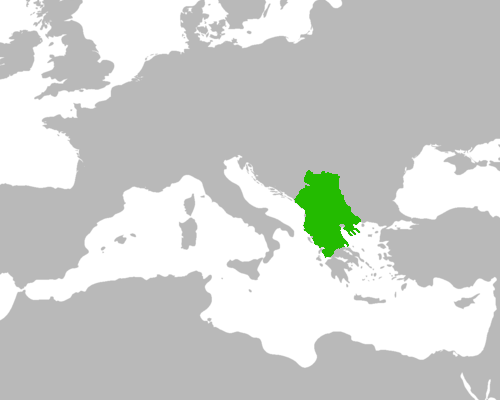
Approximate borders of the Serbian Empire in 1350

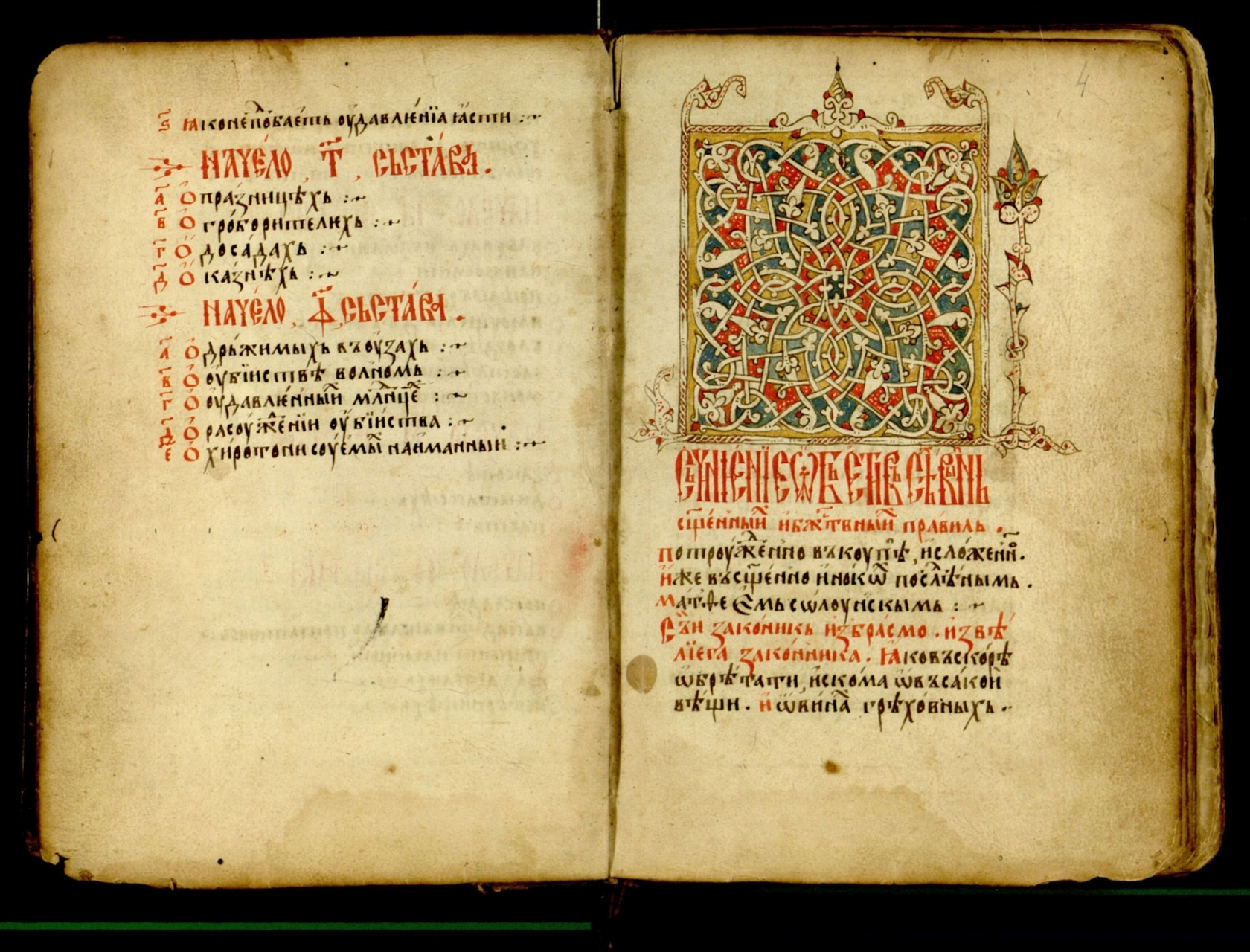
Dušan's Code, a compilation of several legal systems. It was used in the Serbian Empire

The Serbs in the Byzantine world lived in the so-called Slav lands, lands initially out of Byzantine control and independent. The Vlastimirović dynasty established the Serbian Principality ca. 780. In 822, Frankish annalists recorded that for the Serbs "is said to be holding the large part of Dalmatia". Christianization of Serbs, initiated in the 7th century, was a gradual process, finalized by the middle of the 9th century. In the mid-10th century, Serbian state stretched between the shores of the Adriatic Sea, the Neretva, the Sava, the Morava, and Skadar. Ethnic identity of local populations remains a matter of historiographical disputes.

In 924, the Serbs ambushed and defeated a small Bulgarian army, provoking a major retaliatory campaign that ended with Bulgaria's annexation of Serbia at the end of that year. Soon after death of Bulgarian tsar Simeon I the Great in 927, Časlav escaped from Preslav to Serbia and reestablished Serbian Principality. Restored Serbian Principality existed until Časlav's death c. 960. Threatened by an alliance between the Byzantines and the Serbian state of Duklja, in 997 the Bulgarian tsar Samuel defeated and captured its Prince Jovan Vladimir and took control of the Serb lands again. The state disintegrated after the death of the last known Vlastimirid ruler; the Byzantines annexed the region and held it for a century, until 1040 when the Serbs under the leadership of what would become the Vojislavljević dynasty revolted in Duklja, a maritime region. In 1091, the Vukanović dynasty established the Serbian Grand Principality, based in Raška (Latin: Rascia).

In 1166, Stefan Nemanja assumed the throne, marking the beginning of a prospering Serbia, henceforth under the rule of the Nemanjić dynasty. Nemanja's son Rastko (posth. Saint Sava), gained autocephaly for the Serbian Church in 1219 and authored the oldest known constitution, and at the same time Stefan the First-Crowned established the Serbian Kingdom in 1217. Medieval Serbia reached its peak during the reign of Stefan Dušan (1331–1355), who took advantage of the Byzantine civil war and doubled the size of the state by conquering territories to the south and east at the expense of Byzantium, reaching as far as the Peloponnese, also being crowned Emperor of Serbs and Greeks in 1346.

The Battle of Kosovo against the rising Ottoman Empire in 1389 marks a turning point and is considered as a beginning of the fall of the medieval Serbian state. The magnate families Lazarević and Branković ruled the suzerain Serbian Despotate afterwards (in the 15th and 16th centuries). After the fall of Constantinople to the Ottomans in 1453 and the Siege of Belgrade, the Serbian Despotate fell in 1459 following the siege of the provisional capital of Smederevo. By 1455, central Serbia was completely conquered by the Ottoman Empire. After repelling Ottoman attacks for over 70 years, Belgrade finally fell in 1521. The entirety of Délvidék (today Vojvodina), which was inhabited by Serbs and Hungarians, was formally consolidated within the Ottoman Empire by 1541.

== Early modern history ==
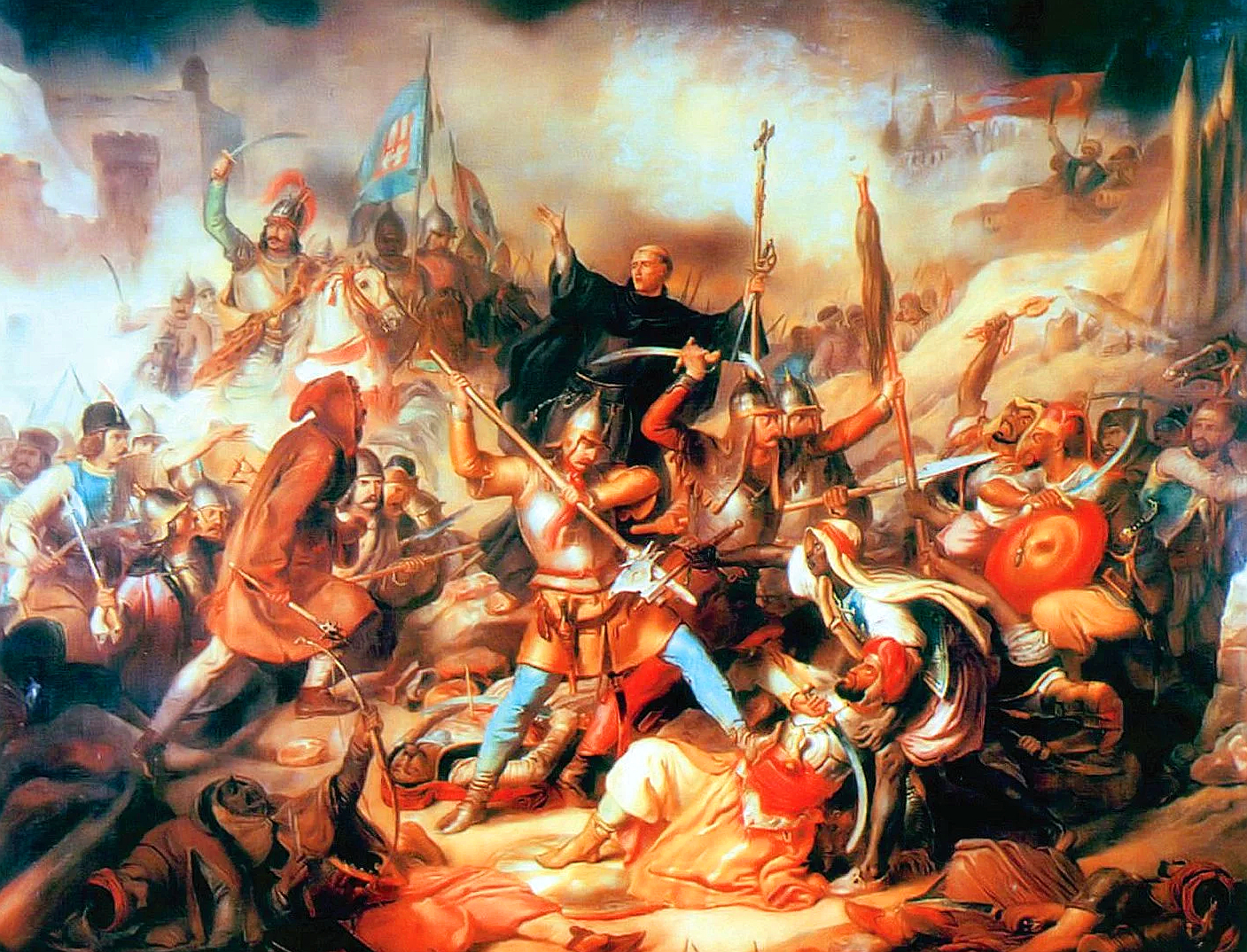
The 1456 Siege of Belgrade by Ottoman Sultan Mehmed II

During the Early Modern period, from the Ottoman conquest of Serbia in the second half of 15th century, up to the beginning of the Serbian Revolution in 1804, several Habsburg–Ottoman wars were fought on the territory of modern Serbia. The era includes successive periods of Ottoman and Habsburg rule in various parts of Serbia.

=== Ottoman rule ===
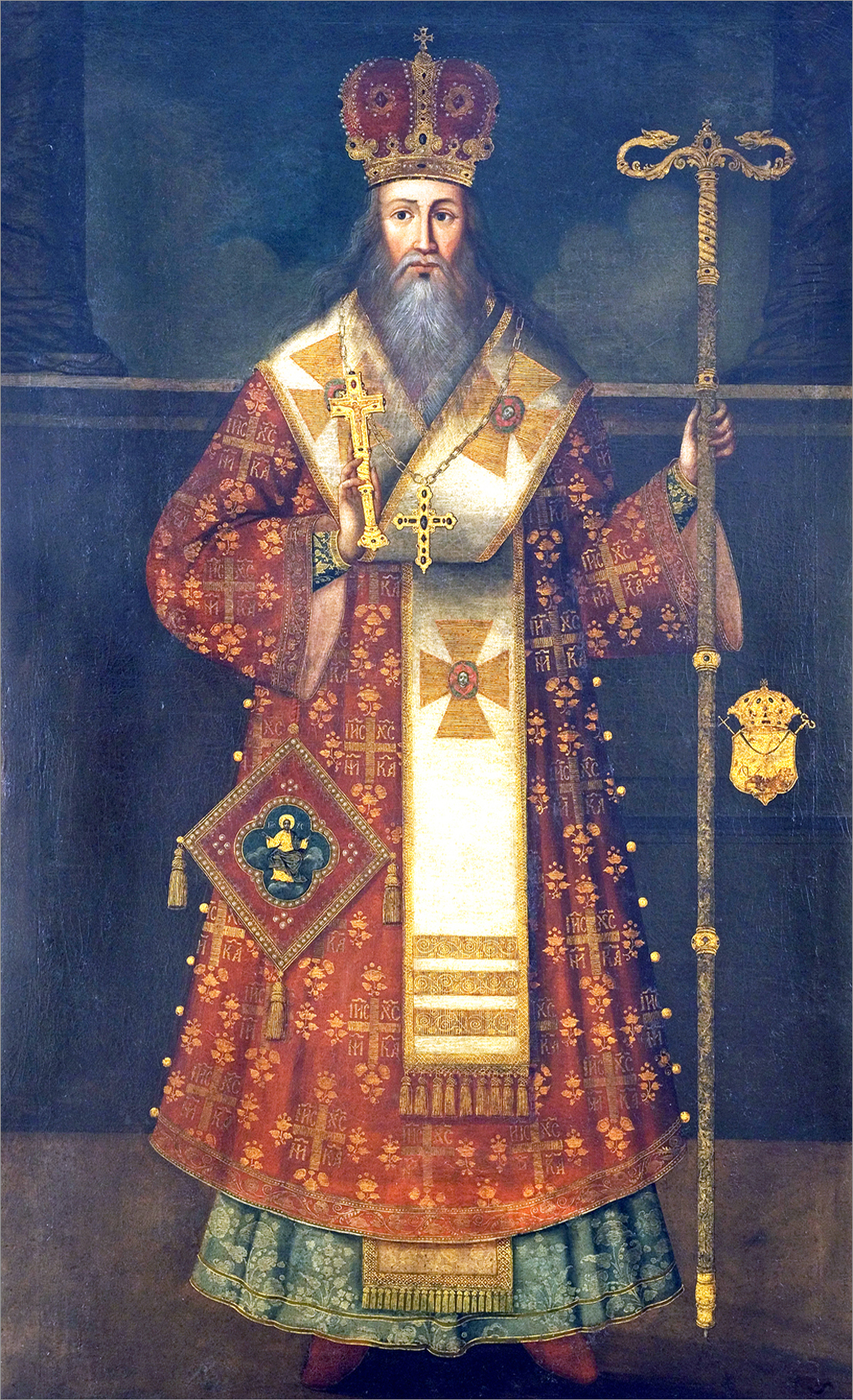
Serbian Patriarch Arsenije III

Medieval Bosnia, Herzegovina, and Zeta lasted until 1463, 1483, and 1496 respectively. A Serbian principality was established a few years after the fall of the Serbian Despotate, when the Branković dynasty and other Serbian nobles were granted lands in what is now Vojvodina by the Kingdom of Hungary. It was ruled by exiled Serbian despots and nobles, ending around the Ottoman siege of Buda in 1541. The residence of the despots was Kupinik (modern Kupinovo). The Despots were: Vuk Grgurević-Branković (1471–1485), Đorđe Branković (1486–1496), Jovan Branković (1496–1502), Ivaniš Berislavić (1504–1514), Stjepan Berislavić (1520–1535), Radič Božić (1527–1528, Zapolya faction's pretender), and Pavle Bakić (1537). Stevan Berislavić moved in 1522 to Slavonia, since Kupinik was seized by the Ottoman forces.

Many Serbs were recruited during the devshirme system, a form of slavery in the Ottoman Empire, in which boys from Balkan Christian families were forcibly converted to Islam and trained for infantry units of the Ottoman army known as the Janissaries.

From the 14th century onward an increasing number of Serbs began migrating to the north to the region today known as Vojvodina, which was part of the Kingdom of Hungary at the time. The Hungarian kings encouraged the immigration of Serbs to the kingdom, and hired many of them as soldiers and border guards. During the Ottoman conquest of Hungary, this Serb population performed an attempt of the restoration of the Serbian state. In the Battle of Mohács on 29 August 1526, the Ottoman Empire defeated the Hungarian army. Soon after the battle, the leader of Serbian mercenaries in Hungary, Jovan Nenad, established his rule in what is now Vojvodina. He created an ephemeral independent state, with Subotica as its capital. King John of Hungary defeated Jovan Nenad in 1527.

European powers, and Austria in particular, fought many wars against the Ottoman Empire, sometimes with assistance from Serbs. During the Austrian–Ottoman War (1593–1606), in 1594, some Serbs participated in an uprising in Banat—the Pannonian part of the Ottoman Empire, and Sultan Murad III retaliated by burning the relics of St. Sava. Austria established troops in Herzegovina but when peace was signed by Ottoman Empire and Austria, Austria abandoned to Ottoman vengeance. This sequence of events became customary for the centuries that followed.

During the Great War (1683–90) between the Ottoman Empire and the Holy League—created with the sponsorship of the Pope and including Austria, Poland and Venice—these three powers as means of divide and conquer strategy, incited including Serbs to rebel against the Ottoman authorities and soon uprisings and terrorism spread throughout the western Balkans: from Montenegro and the Dalmatian Coast to the Danube basin and the regions of Macedonia, Raška, Kosovo and Metohija. However, when the Austrians started to pull out of the Ottoman region, they invited Austrian-loyal people to come north with them into Hungarian territories. Having to choose between Ottoman reprisal or living in Hungary, some Serbs abandoned their homesteads and headed north led by patriarch Arsenije Čarnojević.

Another important episode in the history of the region took place in 1716–18, when the territories ranging from Dalmatia, and Bosnia and Herzegovina to Belgrade and the Danube basin became the battleground for a new Austria-Ottoman war launched by Prince Eugene of Savoy. Some Serbs sided once again with Austria. After a peace treaty was signed in Požarevac, the Ottomans lost all its possessions in the Danube basin, as well as today's northern Serbia and northern Bosnia, parts of Dalmatia and the Peloponnesus. Hacı Mustafa Pasha was the military governor of Belgrade from 1793 to 1801. Unlike most senior Ottoman appointees he was not a member of the wealthy and militarily powerful ayan class of local notables. Instead he was a career bureaucrat who feuded with the ayan. Sultan Selim III (r. 1789–1807) wanted to recentralize provincial governance but this experiment turned out badly because of the alliance between the ayan and the corrupt janissaries.

The last Austrian-Ottoman war was in 1788–91, when the Austrians urged the Christians in Bosnia and Serbia to rebel. No wars were fought afterwards until the 20th century that marked the fall of both Austrian and Ottoman empires, staged together by the European powers just after World War I.

== Modern history ==
Miloš Obrenović, Prince of Serbia (1815–1839)

=== Serbian Revolution and Autonomous Principality (1804–1878) ===
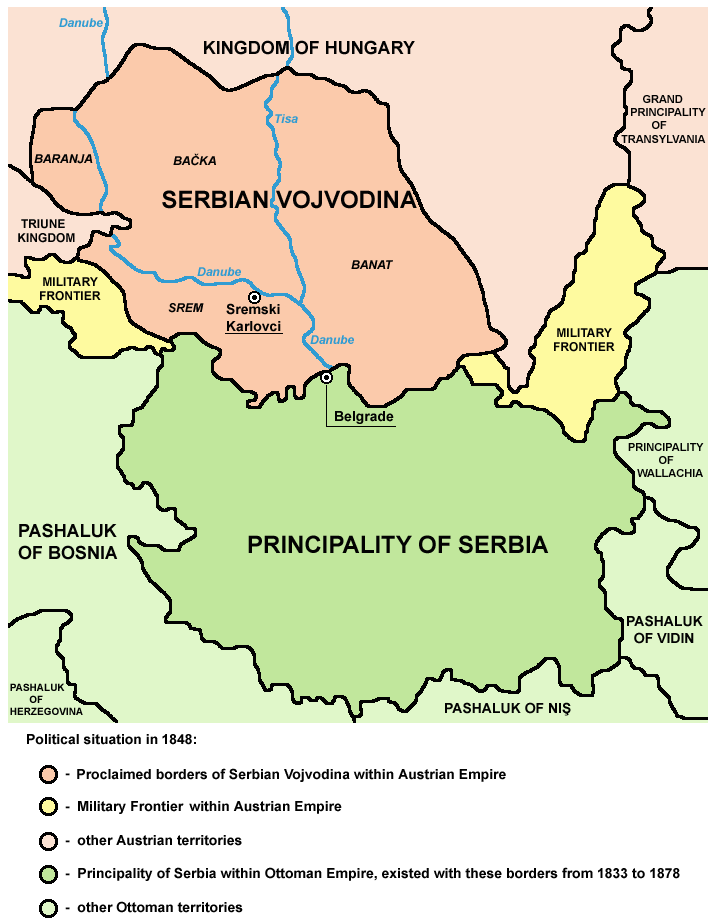
Southern and Northern Serbia (Vojvodina) in 1848

Coat of arms of the Principality of Serbia

Serbia gained its autonomy from the Ottoman Empire in two uprisings in 1804 (led by Đorđe Petrović – Karađorđe) and 1815 (led by Miloš Obrenović), although Turkish troops continued to garrison the capital, Belgrade, until 1867. In 1817 the Principality of Serbia was granted de facto independence from the Ottoman Empire. High officials in the Austro-Hungarian Empire lobbied for Ottoman approval of the liberal 1869 constitution for Serbia, which depended on the Porte for final approval. Vienna's strategy was that a liberal political system in Serbia would divert its impulse to foment nationalist unrest within its neighbors, and also delay its efforts to gain territory at the expense of the Ottoman Empire.

The Serbs launched not only a national revolution but a social one as well. In the process of national unity, Serbia underwent a degree of modernization. The successes included freedom from foreign rule, acquisition of land by the peasants, Belgrade becoming the political and cultural center, and the diffusion of adoption of modern European norms and economic institutions. Less success was reflected in the long delays and disappointments, continued deep poverty, and a growing chasm between the modernizing urban elite and the traditionalistic peasantry.

=== Principality/Kingdom of Serbia (1878–1918) ===
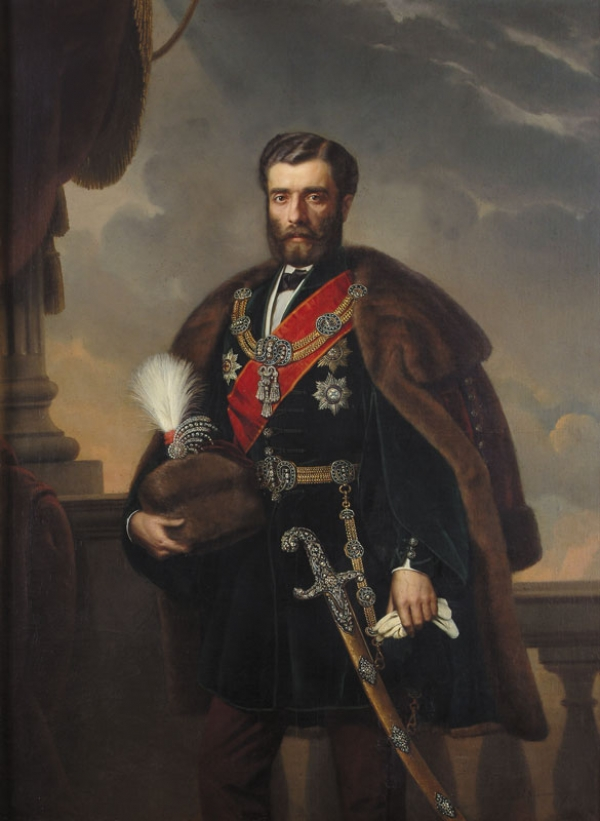
Mihailo Obrenović, Prince of Serbia (1860–1868)

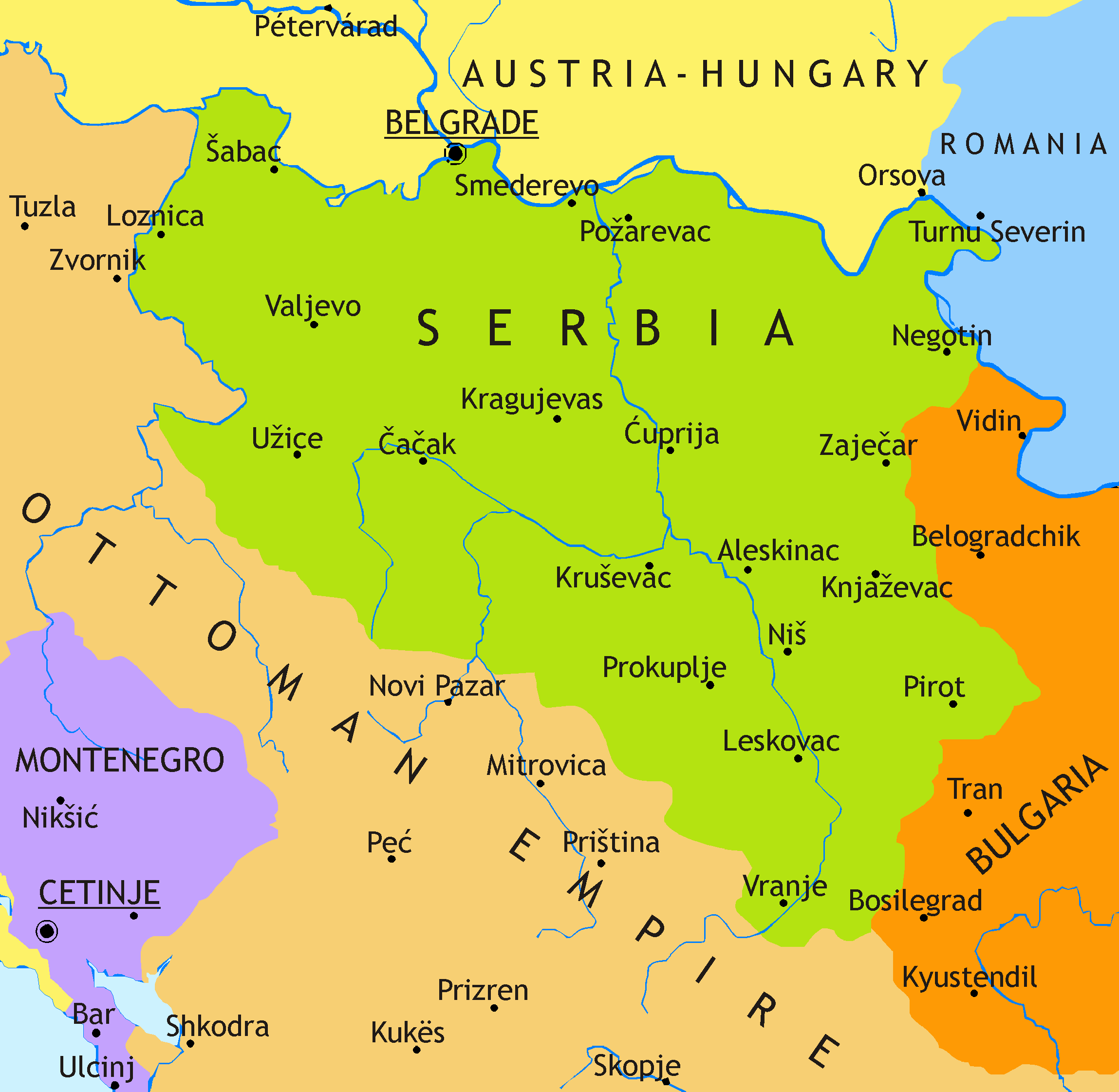
Serbia within borders of 1878–1912

The Autonomous Principality became an internationally recognized independent country following the Russo-Turkish War in 1878. Serbia remained a principality or kneževina (knjaževina) until 1882, when it became a Kingdom, during which the internal politics revolved largely around dynastic rivalry between the Obrenović and Karađorđević families.

This period was marked by the alternation of two dynasties descending from Đorđe Petrović—Karađorđe, leader of the First Serbian Uprising, and Miloš Obrenović, leader of the Second Serbian Uprising. Further development of Serbia was characterized by general progress in economy, culture and arts, primarily owing to a wise state policy of sending young people to European capitals to get an education. They all brought back a new spirit and a new system of values. One of the external manifestations of the transformation that the former Turkish province was going through was the proclamation of the Province of Serbia in 1882.

During the Revolutions of 1848 the Serbs in the Austrian Empire proclaimed a Serbian autonomous province known as Serbian Vojvodina. By a decision of the Austrian emperor, in November 1849 this province was transformed into the Austrian crown land known as the Voivodeship of Serbia and Temes Banat (Dukedom of Serbia and Tamiš Banat). Against the will of the Serbs, the province was abolished in 1860, but the Serbs from the region gained another opportunity to achieve their political demands in 1918. Today this region is known as Vojvodina.

In 1885 Serbia protested against the unification of Bulgaria and Eastern Rumelia and attacked Bulgaria. This is known as the Serbo-Bulgarian War. Despite better weapons and skilled commanders, Serbia lost the war.

In the second half of the 19th century, Serbia gained statehood as the Kingdom of Serbia. It thus became part of the constellation of European states and the first political parties were founded, giving new momentum to political life. The May Coup in 1903, bringing Karađorđe's grandson to the throne with the title of King Peter I, opened the way for parliamentary democracy in Serbia. Having received a European education this liberal king translated ‘On Liberty’ by John Stuart Mill and gave his country a democratic constitution. It initiated a period of parliamentary government and political freedom interrupted by the outbreak of the liberation wars.

Serbia had several national goals. The large number of Serbs living in Bosnia looked to Serbia as the focus of their nationalism, but they were ruled by the Germans of the Austrian Empire. Austria's annexation of Bosnia in 1908 deeply alienated the Serbian peoples. Plotters swore revenge, which they achieved in 1914 by assassination of the Austrian heir. Serbian intellectuals dreamed of a South Slavic state—which in the 1920s became Yugoslavia.

Serbia was landlocked and strongly felt the need for access to the Mediterranean, preferably through the Adriatic Sea. Austria worked hard to block Serbian access to the sea, for example by helping with the creation of Albania in 1912. Montenegro, Serbia's only real ally, did have a small port but Austrian territory intervened, blocking access until Serbia acquired Novi Pazar and part of Macedonia from Turkey in 1913. To the south Bulgaria blocked Serbian access to the Aegean Sea.

Serbia, Greece, Montenegro and Bulgaria formed the Balkan League and went to war with the Ottomans in 1912–13. They won decisively and expelled that Empire from almost all of the Balkans. The main remaining foe was Austria, which strongly rejected Pan-Slavism and Serbian nationalism and was ready to make war to end those threats. Ethnic nationalism would doom the multicultural Austro-Hungarian Empire. Expansion of Serbia would block Austrian and German aspirations for direct rail connections to Constantinople and the Middle East. Serbia relied primarily on Russia for Great Power support but Russia was very hesitant at first to support Pan-Slavism, and counselled caution. However, in 1914 it reversed positions and promised military support to Serbia.

=== Serbia in World War I (1914–1918) ===
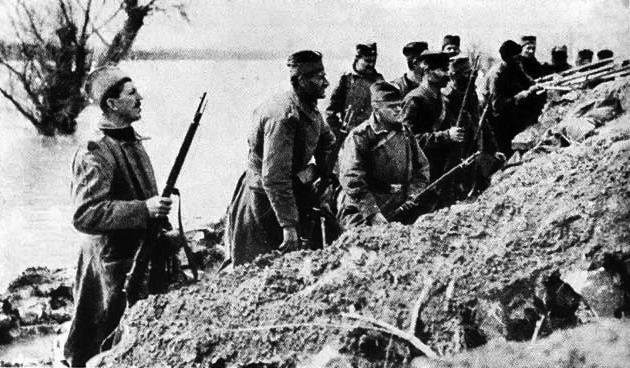
Serbian infantry positioned at Ada Ciganlija

Despite its small size and population of 4.6 million, Serbia had the most effective manpower mobilization of the war, and had a highly professional officer corps. It called 350,000 men to arms, of whom 185,000 were in combat units. However the casualties and expenditure of munitions in the Balkan Wars left Serbia depleted and dependent on France for supplies. Austria invaded twice in 1914 and was turned back.

The 28 June 1914 assassination of Austrian Crown Prince Franz Ferdinand in the Bosnian capital Sarajevo, by Gavrilo Princip, a member of Young Bosnia and one of seven assassins, served as a pretext for the Austrian declaration of war on Serbia on 28 July 1914, marking the beginning of World War I, despite Serbia's acceptance three days earlier of nearly all of the Habsburg Empire’s demands. The Habsburg army invaded Serbia capturing the capital Belgrade on 2 December 1914, however the Serbian Army successfully defended the country, won several victories, and on 15 December 1914 recaptured Belgrade.

In late 1915, however, German generals were given control and invaded Serbia with Austrian and Bulgarian forces. The Serbian army retreated across the Albanian mountain ranges to the Adriatic Sea by January 1916. Only 70,000 made it through to be evacuated to Greece by Italian, French and British naval forces.

Serbia became an occupied land. Disease was rampant but the Austrians were pragmatic and paid well for food supplies, so conditions were not harsh. Instead Austria tried to depoliticize Serbia, to minimize violence, and to integrate the country into the Empire. Nevertheless, the harshness of the military occupation and the Austrian military atrocities committed in Serbia worked against these political aims and Serbian nationalism remained defiant and many young men slipped out to help rebuild the Serbian army in exile.

The Entente promised the territories of Srem, Bačka, Baranja, eastern Slavonia, Bosnia and Herzegovina and eastern Dalmatia to Serbia as a reward after the war. Having recuperated on Corfu the Serbian Army returned to combat on the Thessaloniki front together with other Entente forces. Serbia suffered 1,264,000 casualties—28% of its population of 4.6 million, which also represented 58% of its male population—a loss from which it never fully recovered. Serbia suffered the biggest casualty rate in World War I.

=== Kingdom of Serbs, Croats and Slovenes/Kingdom of Yugoslavia (1918–1941) ===
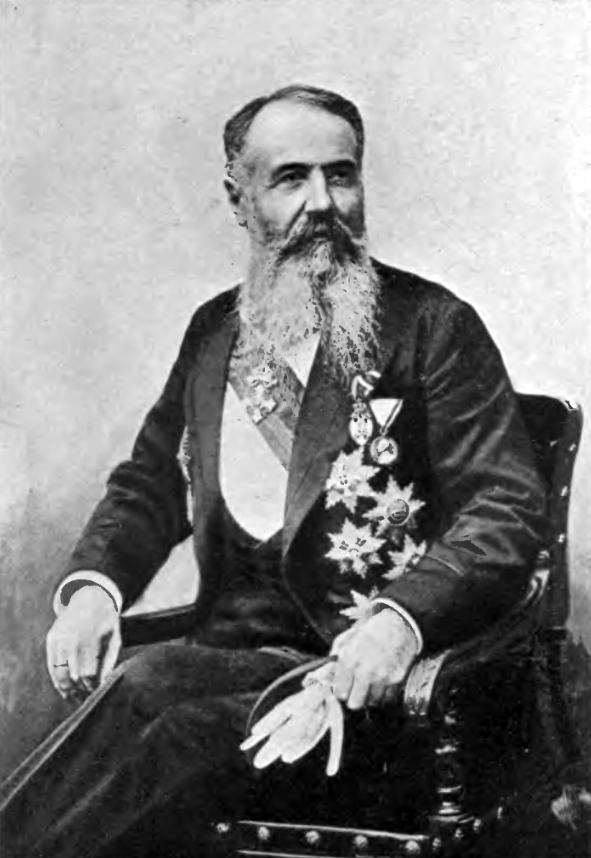
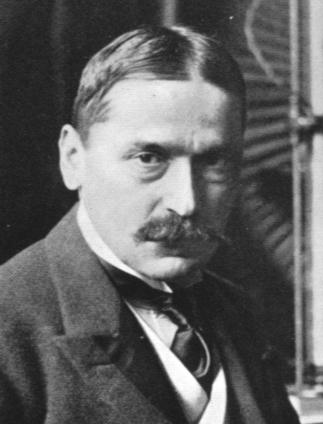
Left: Nikola Pašić was twice a mayor of Belgrade, Prime Minister of the Kingdom of Serbia during World War I and later of Yugoslavia on multiple terms
Right: Mihajlo Pupin, physicist and physical chemist, a founding member of NACA. He influenced the final decisions of the Paris Peace Conference when the borders of the Kingdom of Yugoslavia were drawn

A successful Allied offensive in September 1918 secured first Bulgaria's surrender and then the liberation of the occupied Serbian territories (November 1918). On 25 November, the Assembly of Serbs, Bunjevci, and other nations of Vojvodina in Novi Sad voted to join the region to Serbia. Also, on 29 November the National Assembly of Montenegro voted for union with Serbia, and two days later an assembly of leaders of Austria–Hungary's southern Slav regions voted to join the new State of Slovenes, Croats and Serbs.

With the end of World War I and the collapse of both the Habsburg and Ottoman Empires the conditions were met for proclaiming the Kingdom of Serbs, Croats and Slovenes in December 1918. The Yugoslav ideal had long been cultivated by the intellectual circles of the three nations that gave the name to the country, but the international constellation of political forces and interests did not permit its implementation until then. However, after the war, idealist intellectuals gave way to politicians, and the most influential Croatian politicians opposed the new state right from the start.

In the early 1920s the Yugoslav government of Serbian prime minister Nikola Pašić used police pressure over voters and ethnic minorities, confiscation of opposition pamphlets and other measures of election rigging to keep the opposition, and mainly the Croatian Peasant Party and its allies in minority in Yugoslav parliament. Pašić believed that Yugoslavia should be as centralized as possible, creating in place of distinct regional governments and identities a Greater Serbian national concept of concentrated power in the hands of Belgrade.

However, what pushed the Kingdom into crisis was when a Serb representative opened fire on the opposition benches in the Parliament, killing two outright and mortally wounding the leader of the Croatian Peasants Party, Stjepan Radić in 1928.

Taking advantage of the resulting crisis, King Alexander I banned national political parties in 1929, assumed executive power, and renamed the country Yugoslavia. He hoped to curb separatist tendencies and mitigate nationalist passions. However, the balance of power changed in international relations: in Italy and Germany, Fascists and Nazis rose to power, and Joseph Stalin became the absolute ruler in the Soviet Union. None of these three states favored the policy pursued by Alexander I. The first two wanted to revise the international treaties signed after World War I, and the Soviets were determined to regain their positions in Europe and pursue a more active international policy. Yugoslavia was an obstacle for these plans, and King Aleksandar I was the pillar of the Yugoslav policy.

During an official visit to France in 1934, the king was assassinated in Marseille by a member of the Internal Macedonian Revolutionary Organization – an extreme nationalist organization in Bulgaria that had plans to annex territories along the eastern and southern Yugoslav border—with the cooperation of the Ustaše – a Croatian fascist separatist organization. The international political scene in the late 1930s was marked by growing intolerance between the principal figures, by the aggressive attitude of the totalitarian regimes. Croatian leader Vladko Maček and his party managed to extort the creation of the Croatian banovina (administrative province) in 1939. The agreement specified that Croatia was to remain part of Yugoslavia, but it was hurriedly building an independent political identity in international relations.

=== Serbia in World War II (1941–1944) ===
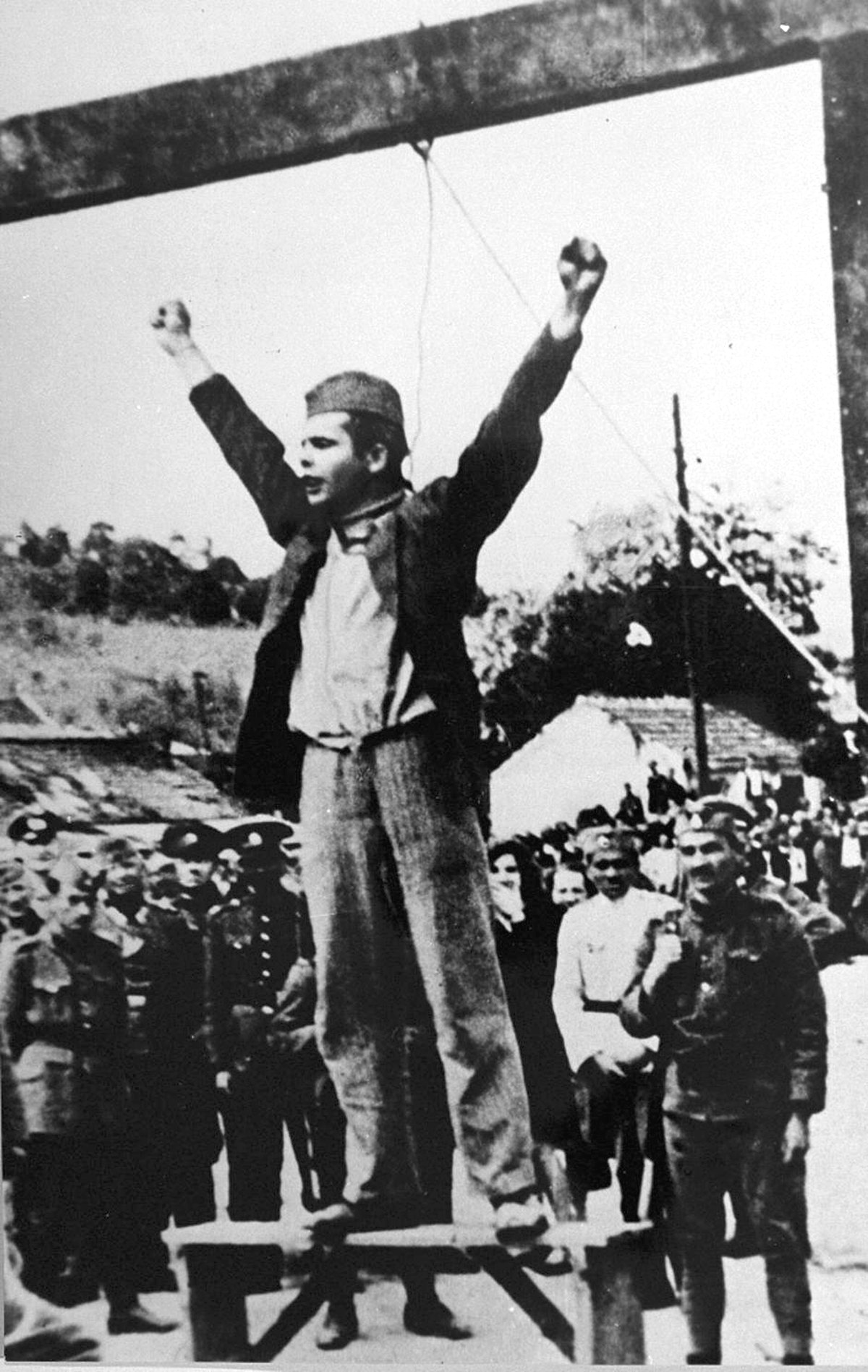
Partisan resistance fighter Stjepan Filipović shouting "Death to fascism, freedom to the People!" seconds before his execution by a Serbian State Guard unit in Valjevo

In the run up to World War II, Prince Regent Paul signed a treaty with Hitler (as did Bulgaria, Romania, and Hungary). However, a popular uprising amongst the people rejected this agreement and Prince Regent Paul was sent to exile following a coup d'état two days after the signing of the agreement. King Peter II assumed full royal duty.

Thus the beginning of the 1940s, Yugoslavia found itself surrounded by hostile countries. Except for Greece, all other neighboring countries had signed agreements with either Germany or Italy. Adolf Hitler was strongly pressuring Yugoslavia to join the Axis powers. The government was even prepared to reach a compromise with him, but the spirit in the country was completely different. Public demonstrations against Nazism prompted a brutal reaction.

On 6 April 1941 Germany, Italy, Hungary, and Bulgaria invaded Yugoslavia, and the Luftwaffe bombed Belgrade for 3 days killing 17,000 people. Belgrade was captured by German forces on 13 April 1941, and four days later on 17 April 1941 the Royal Yugoslavian Army surrendered unconditionally. King Peter II left the country to seek Allied support. The Royal Yugoslav Government, the only legal body of Yugoslavia, continued to work in London. The occupying Axis powers then divided Yugoslavia up. The western parts of the country together with Bosnia and Herzegovina were turned into a Nazi puppet state called the Independent State of Croatia (NDH) and ruled by the Ustashe. Most of the territory of modern Serbia was occupied by the German army and was governed by the German Military Administration in Serbia. The governed territory was called Serbia or the Territory of the Military Commander in Serbia. Besides German military administrators, it was also governed by the Serbian puppet governments first under Milan Aćimović and then under Serbian army general Milan Nedić. The northern territories were annexed by Hungary, and eastern and southern territories by Bulgaria. Kosovo and Metohija were mostly annexed by Albania which was under the sponsorship of fascist Italy. Montenegro also lost territories to Albania and was then occupied by Italian troops. Slovenia was divided between Germany and Italy, which also seized the islands in the Adriatic.

In Serbia, the German occupation authorities organized several concentration camps for Jews, members of the communist Partisan resistance movement, and Chetniks royalist resistance movement.

The biggest concentration camps were Banjica and Sajmište near Belgrade, where, according to the most conservative estimates, around 40,000 Jews were killed. In all those camps, some 90 percent of the Serbian Jewish population perished. In the Bačka region annexed by Hungary, numerous Serbs and Jews were killed in 1942 raid by the Hungarian authorities. The persecutions against ethnic Serb population also occurred in the region of Syrmia, which was controlled by the Independent State of Croatia and in the region of Banat, which was under direct German control.

The ruthless attitude of the German occupation forces and the genocidal policy of the Croatian Ustaša regime, aimed at Serbs, Jews, Roma and anti-Ustaša Croats, created a strong anti-fascist resistance in the NDH. Many joined the Partisan forces created by the Communist Party (National Liberation Army headed by Josip Broz Tito) in the liberation and the revolutionary war against Nazis and all the others who were against communism.

During this war and after it, the Partisans killed many civilians who did not support their Communist ideals. The Communists shot people without trials, or following politically and ideologically motivated courts, such as in the case of Draža Mihailović, leader of the Chetniks. The Agricultural Reform conducted after the war meant that peasants had to give away most of their wheat, grain, and cattle to the state, or face serious imprisonment. Land and property were confiscated on a massive scale. Many people also lost civil rights and their names were smeared. Also, a censorship was enforced on all levels of the society and media, and a cult of Tito was created in the media.

On 20 October 1944 the Soviet Red Army liberated Belgrade and by the end of 1944 all Serbia was free from German control. Yugoslavia was among the countries that had the greatest losses in the war: 1,700,000 (10.8% of the population) people were killed and national damages were estimated at US$9.1 billion according to the prices of that period.

=== Serbia as a federal unit in Socialist Yugoslavia (1945–1992) ===
Coat of arms of the Socialist Republic of Serbia, a constituent country of the SFRY

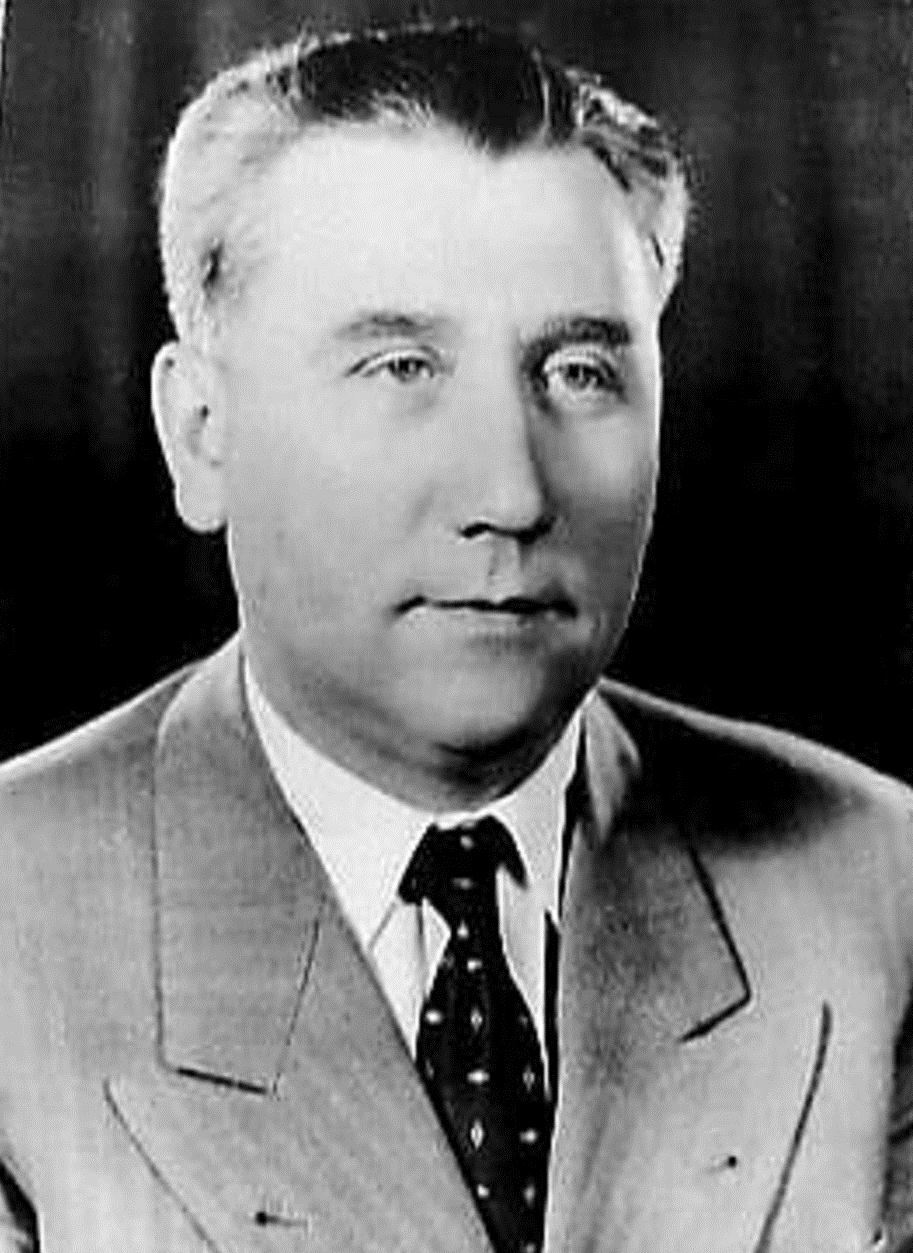
Serbian politician Aleksandar Ranković, vice-president of Yugoslavia (1963–1966)

After the war, Josip Broz Tito became the first president of the new—socialist—Yugoslavia which he ruled through the League of Communists of Yugoslavia. Once a predominantly agricultural country, Yugoslavia was transformed into a mid-range industrial country, and acquired an international political reputation by supporting the decolonization process and by assuming a leading role in the Non-Aligned Movement. Socialist Yugoslavia was established as a federal state comprising six republics, from north to south: Slovenia, Croatia, Bosnia and Herzegovina, Serbia, Montenegro and Macedonia and two autonomous regions within Serbia – Vojvodina and Kosovo.

The basic motto of Tito's Yugoslavia was "brotherhood and unity", workers' self-management, state-owned property with minimal privately owned property. In the beginning, the country copied the Soviet model, but after the 1948 split with the Soviet Union, it turned more towards the West. Eventually, it created its own brand of socialism, with aspects of a market economy, and milked both the East and the West for significant financial loans.

The 1974 constitution produced a significantly less centralized federation, increasing the autonomy of Yugoslavia's republics as well as the autonomous provinces of Serbia.

When Tito died on 4 May 1980, he was succeeded by a presidency that rotated annually between the six Republics and two Autonomous regions. This led to a fatal weakening of central power and ties between the republics. During the 1980s the republics pursued significantly different economic policies, with separatist- oriented Slovenia and Croatia allowing significant market-based reforms, while Serbia kept to its existing program of state ownership. This, too, was a cause of tension between north and south, as Slovenia in particular experienced a period of strong growth. Prior to the war, inflation skyrocketed. Then, under Prime Minister Ante Marković, things began to improve. Economic reforms had opened up the country, the living standard was at its peak, capitalism seemed to have entered the country and nobody thought that just a year later the first gunshots would be fired.

Within a year of Tito's death the first cracks began to show when in the spring of 1981 when on 11 March, 26 March, and 31 March to 2 April an escalating series of increasingly large protests spread from the campus of the University of Pristina to the streets of several cities in Kosovo demanding the upgrading of the Autonomous Region to the status of full Republic – these protests were violently suppressed by the Police with many deaths, and a state of emergency was declared. Serbian concerns about the treatment of Serb minorities in other republics and particularly in Kosovo were exacerbated by the SANU Memorandum, drawn up by the Serbian Academy of Sciences and Arts and published in Sep 1986 byVečernje novosti, which claimed that Serbs were suffering a genocide at the hands of the Kosovo Albanian majority. Slobodan Milošević leader of the League of Communists of Serbia since May 1986, became the champion of the Serbian Nationalists when on 24 Apr 1987 he visited Kosovo Polje and, after local Serbs had clashed with the police declared, 'No one has the right to beat you'.

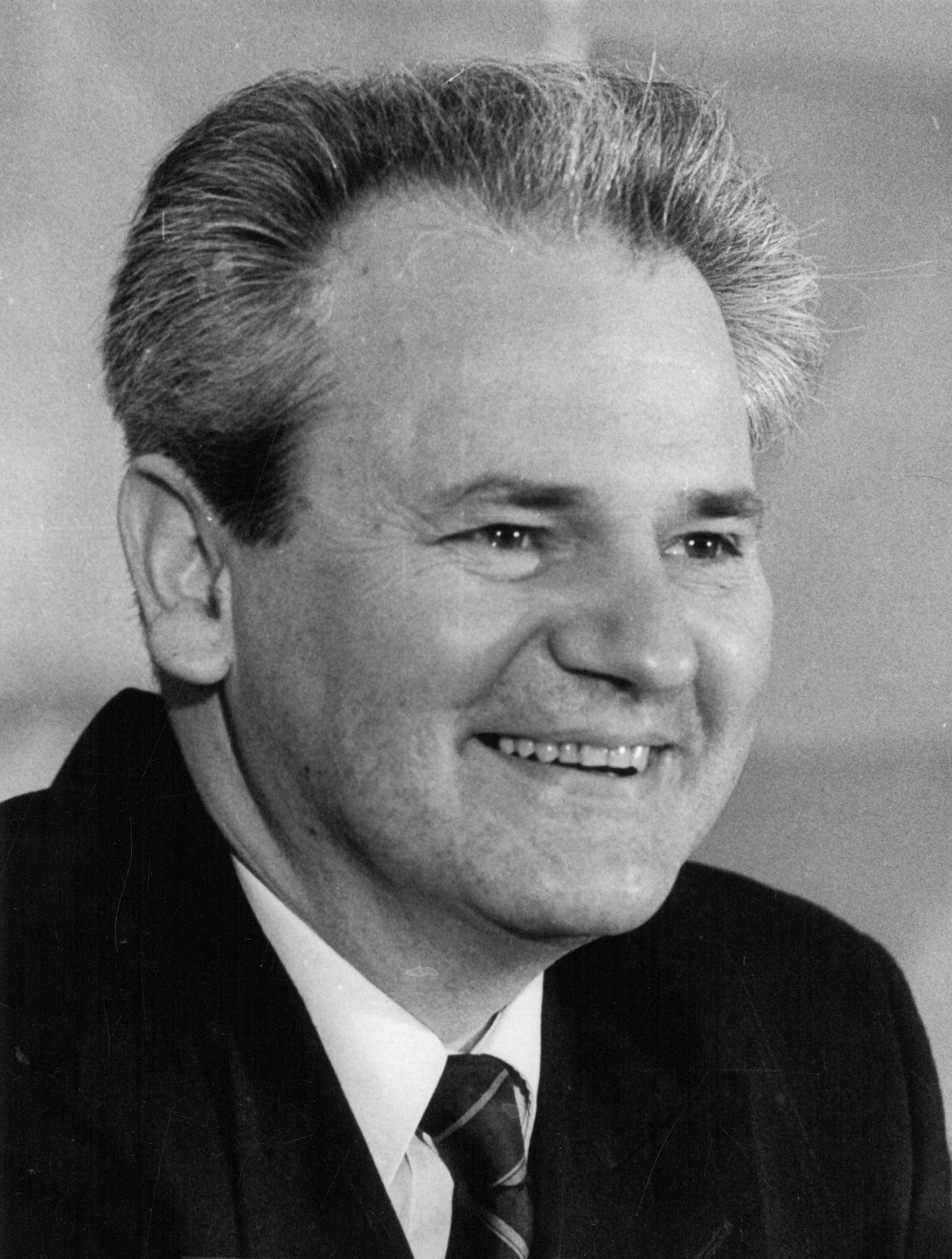
Slobodan Milošević, President of Serbia (1989–1997) and FRY (1997–2000)

Slobodan Milošević became the most powerful politician in Serbia on 25 Sep 1987 when he defeated and humiliated his former mentor Serbian President Ivan Stambolić, during the televised 8th session of the Central Committee of the League of Communists of Serbia. Milosevic governed Serbia from his position as Chairman of the Central Committee of the League of Communists of Serbia until 8 May 1989 when he assumed the Presidency of Serbia. Milosevic supporters gained control of three other constituent parts of Yugoslavia in what became known as the Anti-bureaucratic revolution, Vojvodina on 6 Oct 1988, Kosovo on 17 Nov 1988, and Montenegro on 11 Jan 1989. On 25 Nov 1988 the Yugoslav National Assembly granted Serbia the right to change its constitution. In March 1989 this was done, removing autonomy from Vojvodina and Kosovo, which caused great unrest in Kosovo On 28 June 1989 Slobodan Milošević made what became known as the Gazimestan Speech which was the centrepiece of a day-long event, attended by an estimated one million Serbs, to mark the 600th anniversary of the Serbian defeat at the Battle of Kosovo by the Ottoman Empire. In this speech Milošević's reference to the possibility of "armed battles" in the future of Serbia's national development was seen by many as presaging the collapse of Yugoslavia and the bloodshed of the Yugoslav Wars.

On 23 Jan 1990 at its 14th Congress the Communist League of Yugoslavia voted to remove its monopoly on political power, but the same day effectively ceased to exist as a national party when the League of Communists of Slovenia walked out after Slobodan Milošević blocked all their reformist proposals. On 27 July 1990 Milošević merged the League of Communists of Serbia with several smaller communist front parties to form the Socialist Party of Serbia. A new Constitution was drawn up and came into force on 28 Sep 1990 transforming the one-party Socialist Republic of Serbia into a multi-party Republic of Serbia The first multi-party elections were held on 9 and 23 December 1990 and in what became the pattern for the next several elections the Socialist Party of Serbia won, as Milošević maintained firm control over the state media and opposition parties had little access. On 9 March 1991, a mass rally on the streets of Belgrade turned into a riot with vicious clashes between the protesters and police. It was organized by Vuk Drašković's Serbian Renewal Movement (SPO). Two people died in the ensuing violence.

The Socialist Federal Republic of Yugoslavia broke up in 1991/1992 in a series of wars following the independence declarations of Slovenia and Croatia on 25 Jun 1991, and Bosnia and Herzegovina on 5 Mar 1992. Macedonia left the federation peacefully on 25 Sep 1991. The Yugoslav People's Army(JNA) tried and failed to prevent the separation of Slovenia in the Ten Day War 26 Jun – 6 Jul 1991 and completely withdrew by 26 Oct 1991. The JNA attempted and failed to prevent the separation of Croatia during the first phase of the Croatian War of Independence from 27 Jun 1991 until the truce of Jan 1992, but did successfully enable the Croatian Serb minority to establish the Republic of Serb Krajina which looked to Serbia for support. The biggest battle of this war was the Siege of Vukovar. Following the start of the Bosnian War on 1 April 1992 the JNA officially withdrew all its forces from Croatia and Bosnia in May 1992 and was formally dissolved on 20 May 1992 – its remnant forces being taken over by the new Federal Republic of Yugoslavia.

=== Serbia and Montenegro (1992–2006) ===
The two remaining republics of Yugoslavia, Serbia and Montenegro, formed on 28 April 1992 a new federation named Federal Republic of Yugoslavia.

==== The Milošević years ====
Following the breakup of Yugoslavia, the Federal Republic of Yugoslavia (FRY) was established in 1992 as a federation. In 2003, it was reconstituted as a political union called the State Union of Serbia and Montenegro (SCG).

From 24 March to 10 June 1999, NATO undertook an aerial bombing campaign against the Federal Republic of Yugoslavia following a violent crackdown on ethnic Albanian separatists in the province of Kosovo. After the signing of the Kumanovo Agreement and withdrawal of Yugoslav troops in June, Kosovo was made a United Nations protectorate, under the UN Mission in Kosovo (UNMIK) based in Priština. From early 2001, UNMIK has been working with representatives of the Serbian and union governments to reestablish stable relations in the region. A new assembly of the province was elected in November 2001, which formed a government and chose a president in February 2002.

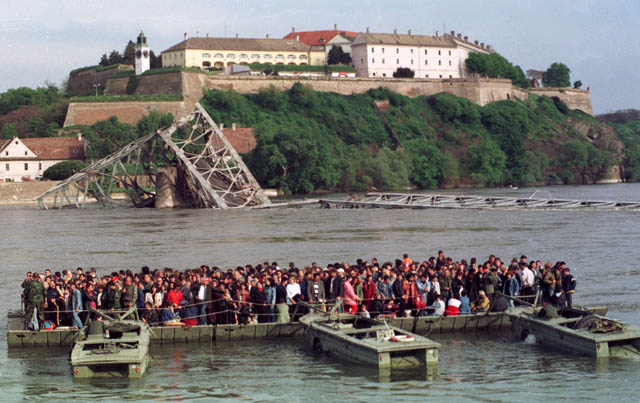
People crossing Danube after destruction of all three bridges in Novi Sad during NATO bombing

In January 1998 Milo Đukanović became Montenegro's president, following bitterly contested elections in October 1997 against Pro-Milošević candidate Momir Bulatović. His coalition followed up with parliamentary elections in May. Đukanović distanced himself from Milošević and pursued pro-Western policies along with advocating for Montenegrin independence from Serbia. Economic ties with Serbia began to be severed as Montenegro formed a new economic policy and adopted the Deutsche Mark as its currency.

Before 5 October, even as opposition grew, Milošević continued to dominate the organs of the Federal Republic of Yugoslavia (FRY) Government. And although his political party, the Socialist Party of Serbia (SPS) (in electoral cartel with Mirjana Markovic' Yugoslav United Left), did not enjoy a majority in either the federal or Serbian parliaments, it dominated the governing coalitions and held all the key administrative posts. An essential element of Milošević's grasp on power was his control of the Serbian police, a heavily armed force of some 100,000 that was responsible for internal security and which committed serious human rights abuses. Routine federal elections in September 2000 resulted in Kostunica receiving less than a majority, requiring a second round. Immediately, street protests and rallies filled cities across the country as Serbs rallied around Vojislav Koštunica, the recently formed Democratic Opposition of Serbia (DOS, a broad coalition of anti-Milošević parties) candidate for FRY president. There had been widespread fear that the second round would be cancelled on the basis of foreign interference in the elections. Cries of fraud and calls for Milošević's removal echoed across city squares from Subotica to Niš.

==== Democratic transition ====
On 5 October 2000, Slobodan Milošević was forced to concede defeat after days of mass protests all across Serbia.

The new FRY President Vojislav Koštunica was soon joined at the top of the domestic Serbian political scene by the Democratic Party's (DS) Zoran Đinđić, who was elected Prime Minister of Serbia at the head of the DOS ticket in December's republican elections. After an initial honeymoon period in the wake of 5 October, DSS and the rest of DOS, led by Đinđić and his DS, found themselves increasingly at odds over the nature and pace of the governments' reform programs. Although initial reform efforts were highly successful, especially in the economic and fiscal sectors, by the middle of 2002, the nationalist Koštunica and the pragmatic Đinđić were openly at odds. Koštunica's party, having informally withdrawn from all DOS decision-making bodies, was agitating for early elections to the Serbian Parliament in an effort to force Đinđić from the scene. After the initial euphoria of replacing Milošević's autocratic regime, the Serbian population, in reaction to this political maneuvering, was sliding into apathy and disillusionment with its leading politicians by mid-2002. This political stalemate continued for much of 2002, and reform initiatives stalled.

In February 2003, the Constitutional Charter was finally ratified by both republics, and the FRY Parliament and the name of the country was changed from Federal Republic of Yugoslavia to Serbia and Montenegro. Under the new Constitutional Charter, most federal functions and authorities devolved to the republic level. The office of President of the Federal Republic of Yugoslavia, held by Vojislav Koštunica, ceased to exist once Svetozar Marović was elected President of Serbia and Montenegro.

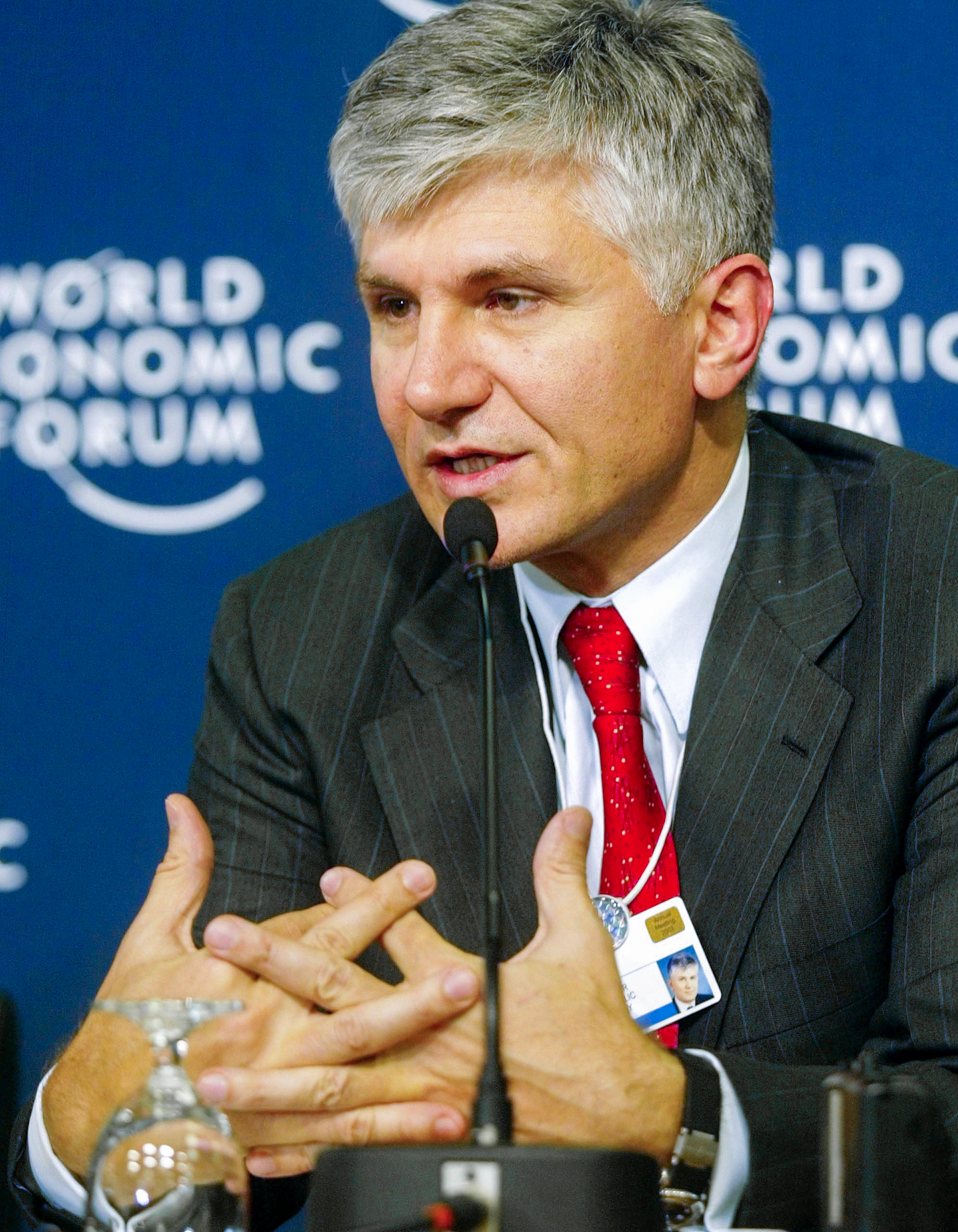
Zoran Đinđić, Prime Minister of Serbia, assassinated in 2003

On 12 March 2003, Serbian Prime Minister Zoran Đinđić was assassinated. The newly formed union government of Serbia and Montenegro reacted swiftly by calling a state of emergency and undertaking an unprecedented crackdown on organized crime which led to the arrest of more than 4,000 people.

Parliamentary elections were held in the Republic of Serbia on 28 December 2003. Serbia had been in a state of political crisis since the overthrow of the post-communist ruler, Slobodan Milošević, in 2001. The reformers, led by former Yugoslav President Vojislav Koštunica, have been unable to gain control of the Serbian presidency because three successive presidential elections have failed to produce the required 50% turnout. The assassination in March 2003 of the reforming Prime Minister, Zoran Đinđić was a major setback.

Despite the great increase in support for the Radicals, the four pro-reform parties (Koštunica's Democratic Party of Serbia, late Prime Minister Đinđić's Democratic Party, now led by Boris Tadić, and the G17 Plus group of liberal economists led by Miroljub Labus, plus the SPO-NS) won 49.8% of the vote, compared with 34.8% for the two anti-western parties, the Radicals of Vojislav Šešelj and the Socialists of Milošević, and won 146 seats to 104.

At the 2004 Presidential election Boris Tadić, candidate of the Democratic Party won over Tomislav Nikolić, of the Serbian Radical Party, sealing the future reform and EU-integration path of Serbia.

=== Republic of Serbia (2006–present) ===
During the early 2000s governments of Montenegro resumed pro-independence policies, and political tensions with Serbia simmered despite political changes in Belgrade. The question whether the Federal Yugoslav state would continue to exist became a serious issue.

Following Montenegro's vote for full independence in the referendum of 21 May 2006 (55.4% yes, 44.6% no), Montenegro declared independence on 3 June 2006. This was followed on 5 June 2006 by Serbia's decision on the assumption of jurisdiction, marking the final dissolution of the State Union of Serbia and Montenegro, and the re-emergence of Serbia as an independent state for the first time since 1918.

A referendum was held on 28 and 29 October 2006 on a proposed draft of the new Constitution of Serbia, which was approved. The constitution is Serbia's first as an independent state since the Kingdom of Serbia's 1903 constitution.

The 2007 elections confirmed the pro-reform and pro-European stance of the Serbian Parliament, in which Tadić's party doubled his representation.

On 3 February 2008, Tadić was re-elected as President.

The Serbian government passed through weeks of severe crisis after the unilateral declaration of independence of its southern province of Kosovo on 17 February 2008, which was gradually recognized by the United States and numerous European Union countries. The crisis was fuelled by the demand by Prime Minister Vojislav Koštunica of the Democratic Party of Serbia (DSS) to the Democratic Party (Serbia) (DS), which held governmental majority, of a restructuring of the governmental contract including an annex according to which Serbia can continue European integration exclusively with Kosovo as its integral part, as stated in the 2006 Constitution. The DS and G17+ refused, and Koštunica had to resign on 8 March 2008, while also asking the President to dismiss the parliament and schedule pre-term parliamentary elections.

These pre-term parliamentary elections were held on 11 May 2008, barely a year after the previous parliamentary election. The results showed a net increase of votes for Tadić's ZES coalition, passing from 87 to 102 seats. After long and difficult negotiations, a new pro-European government was formed on 7 July 2008 by 128 out of 250 parliamentary votes of ZES, SPS-PUPS-JS and 6 out of 7 minorities representatives. The new prime minister was Mirko Cvetković, candidate of the Democratic Party.

In May 2012, nationalist Tomislav Nikolić was elected as President of Serbia after defeating Tadić in the presidential election. In July 2012, Serbian Socialist Party leader Ivica Dačić became prime minister of Serbia after parliamentary elections. His government was a coalition of President Tomislav Nikolić's nationalist Serbian Progressive Party, the Socialist Party and other groups. Since the Progressive Party came to power, Serbia has suffered from democratic backsliding into authoritarianism, followed by a decline in media freedom and civil liberties.

Serbian Progressive Party (SNS) won in the 2014 election and the leader of SNS Aleksandar Vučić became prime minister. Three years later he moved to the presidency. Ana Brnabić has been prime minister since 2017, but president Vučić has kept a firm hold on executive power.

Since his election as President of Serbia in 2017, Aleksandar Vučić has worked on establishing good relations with European, Russian and Chinese partners.

In June 2020, Serbia's ruling Progressive Party (SNS) won a landslide victory in parliamentary elections. Main opposition groups boycotted the vote. According to the opposition the conditions were not free and fair. In April 2022, President Aleksandar Vučić was re-elected. Vucic's Serbian Progressive Party (SNS) won the snap parliamentary election, which was held simultaneously with the presidential election. Serbia drew western criticism for not joining EU sanctions against Russia and maintaining bilateral relations after the 2022 Russian invasion of Ukraine. However, Serbia condemned Russia at the United Nations General Assembly and Human Rights Council. In December 2023, ruling Serbian Progressive Party (SNS) of President Vučić won a snap parliamentary election, gaining an absolute majority with more than half of the 250 seats in the National Assembly.

As of January 2024, more than 300,000 Russians have emigrated to Serbia since the start of the Russian invasion of Ukraine. About one in 10 has been issued with a residence permit.

==== Kosovo dispute ====
On 17 February 2008 self-proclaimed representatives of Kosovo Albanians, acting outside the UNMIK's PISG framework (not representing the Assembly of Kosovo or any other of these institutions), issued a declaration of independence establishing the Republic of Kosovo to mixed international reactions.

In 2013, the two sides began to normalise relations in accordance with the Brussels Agreement, but the process stalled in November 2018 after Kosovo imposed a 100 percent tax on importing Serbian goods. On 1 April 2020, Kosovo withdrew the tax.

==== EU integration ====
Serbia officially applied for European Union membership on 22 December 2009.

Despite its setbacks in the political field, on 7 December 2009 the EU unfroze the trade agreement with Serbia and the Schengen countries dropped the visa requirement for Serbian citizens on 19 December 2009.

A Stabilisation and Association Agreement (SAA) was signed in 2008 and entered into force on 1 September 2013.

== See also ==
- Capitals of Serbia
- List of Serbian monarchs
- List of presidents of Serbia
- Military history of Serbia

== Bibliography ==
Academic journals

Scholarly secondary sources

- Ágoston, Gábor; Masters, Bruce Alan (2010). Encyclopedia of the Ottoman Empire. Infobase Publishing. ISBN 978-1-4381-1025-7.
- Babac, Dušan M. (2016). The Serbian Army in the Great War, 1914–1918. Solihull: Helion. ISBN 9781910777299.
- Bataković, Dušan T., ed. (2005). Histoire du peuple serbe [History of the Serbian People] (in French). Lausanne: L’Age d’Homme. ISBN 9782825119587.
- Bokovoy, Melissa K.; Irvine, Jill A.; Lilly, Carol S., eds. (1997). State-Society Relations in Yugoslavia, 1945–1992. London: Palgrave Macmillan. ISBN 9780312126902.
- Bozhilov, Ivan; Gyuzelev, Vasil (1999). История на средновековна България VII–XIV век [History of Medieval Bulgaria VII–XIV centuries] (in Bulgarian). Sofia: Анубис. ISBN 954-426-204-0.
- Bronza, Boro (2010). "The Habsburg Monarchy and the Projects for Division of the Ottoman Balkans, 1771–1788". Empires and Peninsulas: Southeastern Europe between Karlowitz and the Peace of Adrianople, 1699–1829. Berlin: LIT Verlag. pp. 51–62. ISBN 9783643106117.
- Bulić, Dejan (2013). "The Fortifications of the Late Antiquity and the Early Byzantine Period on the Later Territory of the South-Slavic Principalities, and their re-occupation". The World of the Slavs: Studies of the East, West and South Slavs: Civitas, Oppidas, Villas and Archeological Evidence (7th to 11th Centuries AD). Istorijski institut SANU. pp. 137–234. ISBN 9788677431044.
- Ćirković, Sima (2004). The Serbs. Malden: Blackwell Publishing. ISBN 9781405142915.
- Ćirković, Sima (2014) [1964]. "The Double Wreath: A Contribution to the History of Kingship in Bosnia". Balcanica (45): 107–143. doi:10.2298/BALC1445107C.
- Clissold, Stephen, ed. (1968). Short History of Yugoslavia from Early Times to 1966. Cambridge: Cambridge University Press. ISBN 9780521095310.
- Cohen, Philip J., ed. (1996). Serbia's Secret War: Propaganda and the Deceit of History. Texas: Texas A&M University Press. ISBN 9780890966884.
- Curta, Florin (2001). The Making of the Slavs: History and Archaeology of the Lower Danube Region, c. 500–700. Cambridge: Cambridge University Press. ISBN 9781139428880.
- Curta, Florin (2006). Southeastern Europe in the Middle Ages, 500–1250. Cambridge: Cambridge University Press.
- Curta, Florin (2019). Eastern Europe in the Middle Ages (500–1300). Leiden and Boston: Brill. ISBN 9789004395190.
- Cox, John K. (2002). The History of Serbia. Westport, Connecticut: Greenwood Press. ISBN 9780313312908.
- Dimić, Ljubodrag (2000). "From Assertions to Knowledge: Yugoslav Historiography Concerning the War of 1941–1945". East European Studies. 9. Seoul: 257–281.
- Dimić, Ljubodrag (2005). "Ideology and culture in Yugoslavia (1945–1955)". Velike sile i male države u hladnom ratu 1945–1955: Slučaj Jugoslavije. Beograd: Filozofski fakultet. pp. 303–320.
- Dimić, Ljubodrag (2005). "Serbien und Jugoslawien (1918–1941)". Österreichische Osthefte. 47 (1–4): 231–264. ISBN 9783825895396.
- Dimić, Ljubodrag (2015). "Serbian Historiography on the Great War". The Serbs and the First World War 1914–1918. Belgrade: Serbian Academy of Sciences and Arts. pp. 383–407. ISBN 9788670256590.
- DiNardo, Richard L. (2015). Invasion: The Conquest of Serbia, 1915. Santa Barbara: Praeger. ISBN 9781440800931.
- Đorđević, Miloš Z. (2010). "A Background to Serbian Culture and Education in the First Half of the 18th Century according to Serbian Historiographical Sources". Empires and Peninsulas: Southeastern Europe between Karlowitz and the Peace of Adrianople, 1699–1829. Berlin: LIT Verlag. pp. 125–131. ISBN 9783643106117.
- Dragnich, Alex N., ed. (1994). Serbia's Historical Heritage. New York: Columbia University Press. ISBN 9780880332446.
- Dragnich, Alex N. (2004). Serbia Through the Ages. Boulder: East European Monographs. ISBN 9780880335416.
- Dvornik, Francis (1962). The Slavs in European History and Civilization. New Brunswick: Rutgers University Press.
- Fine, John Van Antwerp Jr. (1991) [1983]. The Early Medieval Balkans: A Critical Survey from the Sixth to the Late Twelfth Century. Ann Arbor, Michigan: University of Michigan Press. ISBN 0472081497.
- Fine, John Van Antwerp Jr. (1994) [1987]. The Late Medieval Balkans: A Critical Survey from the Late Twelfth Century to the Ottoman Conquest. Ann Arbor, Michigan: University of Michigan Press. ISBN 0472082604.
- Fine, John Van Antwerp Jr. (2005). When Ethnicity Did Not Matter in the Balkans: A Study of Identity in Pre-Nationalist Croatia, Dalmatia, and Slavonia in the Medieval and Early-Modern Periods. Ann Arbor, Michigan: University of Michigan Press. ISBN 0472025600.
- Fryer, Charles (1997). The Destruction of Serbia in 1915. New York: Columbia University Press. ISBN 9780880333856.
- Gavrilović, Zaga (2001). Studies in Byzantine and Serbian Medieval Art. London: The Pindar Press. ISBN 9781899828340.
- Gumz, Jonathan E. (2009). The Resurrection and Collapse of Empire in Habsburg Serbia, 1914–1918. Cambridge: Cambridge University Press. ISBN 9780521896276.
- Hall, Richard C., ed. (2014). War in the Balkans: An Encyclopedic History from the Fall of the Ottoman Empire to the Breakup of Yugoslavia. Santa Barbara, CA: ABC-CLIO. ISBN 9781610690317.
- Hehn, Paul N. (1971). "Serbia, Croatia and Germany 1941–1945: Civil War and Revolution in the Balkans". Canadian Slavonic Papers. 13 (4): 344–373. doi:10.1080/00085006.1971.11091249. JSTOR 40866373.
- Ingrao, Charles; Samardžić, Nikola; Pešalj, Jovan, eds. (2011). The Peace of Passarowitz, 1718. West Lafayette: Purdue University Press. ISBN 9781557535948.
- Isailović, Neven G.; Krstić, Aleksandar R. (2015). "Serbian Language and Cyrillic Script as a Means of Diplomatic Literacy in South Eastern Europe in 15th and 16th Centuries". Literacy Experiences concerning Medieval and Early Modern Transylvania. Cluj-Napoca: George Bariţiu Institute of History. pp. 185–195.
- Ivić, Pavle, ed. (1995). The History of Serbian Culture. Edgware: Porthill Publishers. ISBN 9781870732314.
- Janković, Đorđe (2004). "The Slavs in the 6th Century North Illyricum". Гласник Српског Археолошког Друштва. 20: 39–61.
- Jelavich, Barbara (1983a). History of the Balkans: Eighteenth and Nineteenth Centuries. Vol. 1. Cambridge University Press. ISBN 9780521252492.
- Jelavich, Barbara (1983b). History of the Balkans: Twentieth Century. Vol. 2. Cambridge University Press. ISBN 9780521274593.
- Jireček, Constantin (1911). Geschichte der Serben. Vol. 1. Gotha: Perthes.
- Jireček, Constantin (1918). Geschichte der Serben. Vol. 2. Gotha: Perthes.
- Kia, Mehrdad (2011). Daily Life in the Ottoman Empire. Santa Barbara, California: Greenwood Press. ISBN 9780313064029.
- Komatina, Predrag (2010). "The Slavs of the mid-Danube basin and the Bulgarian expansion in the first half of the 9th century" (PDF). Зборник Радова Византолошког Института. 47: 55–82. Archived (PDF) from the original on 7 September 2026.
- Komatina, Predrag (2015). "The Church in Serbia at the Time of Cyrilo-Methodian Mission in Moravia". Cyril and Methodius: Byzantium and the World of the Slavs. Thessaloniki: Dimos. pp. 711–718.
- Krstić, Aleksandar R. (2016). "The Rival and the Vassal of Charles Robert of Anjou: King Vladislav II Nemanjić". Banatica. 26 (2): 33–51. Archived from the original on 5 March 2023.
- Krstić, Aleksandar R. (2017). "Which Realm will You Opt for? – The Serbian Nobility Between the Ottomans and the Hungarians in the 15th Century". State and Society in the Balkans Before and After Establishment of Ottoman Rule. Belgrade: Institute of History, Yunus Emre Enstitüsü Turkish Cultural Centre. pp. 129–163. ISBN 9788677431259.
- Krstić, Aleksandar R. (2019). "Familiares of the Serbian despots in and from the territory of Banat (1411–1458)". Politics and Society in the Central and South-Eastern Europe (13th–16th centuries). Cluj-Napoca: Editura Mega. pp. 93–109.
- Kuzmanović, Zorica; Mihajlović, Vladimir D. (2015). "Roman Emperors and Identity Constructions in Modern Serbia". Identities: Global Studies in Culture and Power. 22 (4): 416–432. Archived from the original on 15 January 2025.
- Lyon, James B. (2015). Serbia and the Balkan Front, 1914: The Outbreak of the Great War. London: Bloomsbury. ISBN 9781472580054.
- Luttwak, Edward N. (2009). The Grand Strategy of the Byzantine Empire. Harvard University Press. ISBN 9780674035195.
- MacKenzie, David (1996). "The Serbian Warrior Myth and Serbia's Liberation, 1804–1815". Serbian Studies: Journal of the North American Society for Serbian Studies. 10 (2): 133–148. Archived from the original on 23 January 2023.
- MacKenzie, David (2004). "Jovan Ristić at the Berlin Congress 1878". Serbian Studies: Journal of the North American Society for Serbian Studies. 18 (2): 321–339. Archived from the original on 11 July 2024.
- Markovich, Slobodan G. (2011). "Dositey Obradovich: The man who introduced modernity to the Serbs". The South Slav Journal. 30 (3–4): 421–5–27.
- Meriage, Lawrence P. (1978). "The First Serbian Uprising (1804–1813) and the Nineteenth-Century Origins of the Eastern Question" (PDF). Slavic Review. 37 (3): 421–439. doi:10.2307/2497684. JSTOR 2497684. S2CID 222355180.
- Miller, Nicholas (2005). "Serbia and Montenegro". Eastern Europe: An Introduction to the People, Lands, and Culture. Vol. 3. Santa Barbara, CA: ABC-CLIO. pp. 529–581. ISBN 9781576078006.
- Mirković, Miroslava B. (2017). Sirmium: Its History from the First Century AD to 582 AD. Novi Sad: Center for Historical Research.
- Mitrović, Andrej (2007). Serbia's Great War 1914–1918. West Lafayette: Purdue University Press. ISBN 9781557534767.
- Mócsy, András (2014) [1974]. Pannonia and Upper Moesia: A History of the Middle Danube Provinces of the Roman Empire. New York: Routledge. ISBN 9781317754251.
- Nicol, Donald M. (1993) [1972]. The Last Centuries of Byzantium, 1261–1453. Cambridge: Cambridge University Press. ISBN 9780521439916.
- Nielsen, Christian Axboe. "Serbian Historiography after 1991." Contemporary European History 29.1 (2020): 90–103. online Archived 8 March 2021 at the Wayback Machine
- Obolensky, Dimitri (1974) [1971]. The Byzantine Commonwealth: Eastern Europe, 500–1453. London: Cardinal. ISBN 9780351176449.
- Ostrogorsky, George (1956). History of the Byzantine State. Oxford: Basil Blackwell.
- Papazoglu, Fanula (1978). The Central Balkan Tribes in pre-Roman Times: Triballi, Autariatae, Dardanians, Scordisci and Moesians. Amsterdam: Hakkert. ISBN 9789025607937.
- Pavlovich, Paul (1989). The History of the Serbian Orthodox Church. Serbian Heritage Books. ISBN 9780969133124.
- Pavlowitch, Stevan K. (2002). Serbia: The History behind the Name. London: Hurst & Company. ISBN 9781850654773.
- Pavlowitch, Stevan K. (2008). Hitler's new disorder: The Second World War in Yugoslavia. New York: Columbia University Press. ISBN 9780231700504.
- Pešalj, Jovan (2010). "Early 18th-Century Peacekeeping: How Habsburgs and Ottomans Resolved Several Border Disputes after Karlowitz". Empires and Peninsulas: Southeastern Europe between Karlowitz and the Peace of Adrianople, 1699–1829. Berlin: LIT Verlag. pp. 29–42. ISBN 9783643106117.
- Petrović, Vladimir P. (2007). "Pre-Roman and Roman Dardania: Historical and Geographical Considerations" (PDF). Balcanica (37). Balkanološki institut SANU: 7–23.
- Pisarri, Milovan (2013). "Bulgarian Crimes Against Civilians in Occupied Serbia during the First World War". Balcanica (44): 357–390. doi:10.2298/BALC1344357P.
- Popović, Marko; Marjanović-Dušanić, Smilja; Popović, Danica (2016). Daily Life in Medieval Serbia. Belgrade: Clio & Institute for Balkan Studies. ISBN 9788671025256.
- Popović, Svetlana (2001). "The Serbian Episcopal sees in the thirteenth century". Старинар (51): 171–184.
- Radivojević, Biljana; Penev, Goran (2014). "Demographic Losses of Serbia in the First World War and their long-term consequences" (PDF). Economic Annals. 59 (203): 29–54. doi:10.2298/EKA1403029R. Archived (PDF) from the original on 2 December 2017.
- Radojević, Mira; Dimić, Ljubodrag (2014). Serbia in the Great War 1914–1918: A short History. Belgrade: Srpska književna zadruga, Belgrade forum for the world of equals.
- Radosavljević, Nedeljko V. (2010). "The Serbian Revolution and the Creation of the Modern State: The Beginning of Geopolitical Changes in the Balkan Peninsula in the 19th Century". Empires and Peninsulas: Southeastern Europe between Karlowitz and the Peace of Adrianople, 1699–1829. Berlin: LIT Verlag. pp. 171–178. ISBN 9783643106117.
- Rajić, Suzana (2010). "Serbia - the Revival of the Nation-state, 1804–1829: From Turkish Provinces to Autonomous Principality". Empires and Peninsulas: Southeastern Europe between Karlowitz and the Peace of Adrianople, 1699–1829. Berlin: LIT Verlag. pp. 143–148. ISBN 9783643106117.
- Riley-Smith, Jonathan (2001). The Oxford Illustrated History of the Crusades. Oxford University Press. ISBN 9780192854285.
- Rodriguez, Junius P. (1997). The Oxford Illustrated History of the Crusades. ABC-CLIO. ISBN 978-0-87436-885-7.
- Runciman, Steven (1988). The Emperor Romanus Lecapenus and His Reign: A Study of Tenth-Century Byzantium. Cambridge University Press. ISBN 9780521357227.
- Samardžić, Radovan; Duškov, Milan, eds. (1993). Serbs in European Civilization. Belgrade: Nova, Serbian Academy of Sciences and Arts, Institute for Balkan Studies. ISBN 9788675830153.
- Sedlar, Jean W. (1994). East Central Europe in the Middle Ages, 1000–1500. Seattle: University of Washington Press. ISBN 9780295800646.
- Silberstein, Gerard E. "The Serbian campaign of 1915: Its diplomatic background." American Historical Review 73.1 (1967): 51–69 online
- Sotirović, Vladislav B. (2011). "The Serbian Patriarchate of Peć in the Ottoman Empire: The First Phase (1557–94)". Serbian Studies. 25 (2): 143–169. doi:10.1353/ser.2011.0038. S2CID 143629322.
- Soulis, George Christos (1984). The Serbs and Byzantium during the reign of Tsar Stephen Dušan (1331–1355) and his successors. Washington: Dumbarton Oaks Library and Collection. ISBN 9780884021377.
- Stanković, Vlada, ed. (2016). The Balkans and the Byzantine World before and after the Captures of Constantinople, 1204 and 1453. Lanham, Maryland: Lexington Books. ISBN 9781498513265.
- Stavrianos, Leften (2000) [1958]. The Balkans Since 1453. London: Hurst. ISBN 9781850655510.
- Stephenson, Paul (2000). Byzantium's Balkan Frontier: A Political Study of the Northern Balkans, 900–1204. Cambridge University Press. ISBN 9780521770170.
- Stephenson, Paul (2003). The Legend of Basil the Bulgar-Slayer. Cambridge: Cambridge University Press. ISBN 9780521815307.
- Stipčević, Aleksandar (1977). The Illyrians: History and Culture. New Jersey: Noyes Press. ISBN 9780815550525.
- Stokes, Gale. "The absence of nationalism in Serbian politics before 1840." Canadian Review of Studies in Nationalism. (1976) 4#1 pp 77–90.
- Temperley, Harold W. V. (1919) [1917]. History of Serbia (PDF) (2 ed.). London: Bell and Sons.
- Tomasevich, Jozo (2001). War and Revolution in Yugoslavia, 1941–1945: Occupation and Collaboration. Stanford: Stanford University Press. ISBN 9780804779241.
- Turlej, Stanisław (2016). Justiniana Prima: An Underestimated Aspect of Justinian's Church Policy. Krakow: Jagiellonian University Press. ISBN 9788323395560.
- Uzelac, Aleksandar B. (2011). "Tatars and Serbs at the end of the Thirteenth Century". Revista de istorie Militara. 5–6: 9–20.
- Uzelac, Aleksandar B. (2015). "Foreign Soldiers in the Nemanjić State - A Critical Overview". Belgrade Historical Review. 6: 69–89. Archived from the original on 3 June 2024.
- Uzelac, Aleksandar B. (2018). "Prince Michael of Zahumlje – a Serbian ally of Tsar Simeon". Emperor Symeon's Bulgaria in the History of Europe's South-East: 1100 years from the Battle of Achelous. Sofia: St Kliment Ohridski University Press. pp. 236–245.
- Zens, Robert W. (2012). "In the Name of the Sultan: Haci Mustafa Pasha of Belgrade and Ottoman Provincial Rule in the Late 18th Century". International Journal of Middle East Studies. 44 (1): 129–146. doi:10.1017/S0020743811001280. JSTOR 41474984. S2CID 162893473.
- Živković, Tibor (2008). Forging unity: The South Slavs between East and West 550–1150. Belgrade: The Institute of History, Čigoja štampa. ISBN 9788675585732.
- Živković, Tibor (2012). De conversione Croatorum et Serborum: A Lost Source. Belgrade: The Institute of History. Archived from the original on 8 December 2024.
- Zametica, John. Folly and malice: the Habsburg empire, the Balkans and the start of World War One (London: Shepheard–Walwyn, 2017). 416pp.

Primary sources

- Moravcsik, Gyula, ed. (1967) [1949]. Constantine Porphyrogenitus: De Administrando Imperio (2nd revised ed.). Washington D.C.: Dumbarton Oaks Center for Byzantine Studies. ISBN 9780884020219.
- Pertz, Georg Heinrich, ed. (1845). Einhardi Annales. Hanover.
- Constantine VII Porphyrogenitus (1840). De Ceremoniis (Reiske, J. J. ed.). Impensis E. Weberi.
- Scholz, Bernhard Walter, ed. (1970). Carolingian Chronicles: Royal Frankish Annals and Nithard's Histories. University of Michigan Press. ISBN 0472061860.
- Thurn, Hans, ed. (1973). Ioannis Scylitzae Synopsis historiarum. Berlin-New York: De Gruyter. ISBN 9783110022858.
- Шишић, Фердо, ed. (1928). Летопис Попа Дукљанина (Chronicle of the Priest of Duklja). Београд-Загреб: Српска краљевска академија.
- Кунчер, Драгана (2009). Gesta Regum Sclavorum. Vol. 1. Београд-Никшић: Историјски институт, Манастир Острог.
- Живковић, Тибор (2009). Gesta Regum Sclavorum. Vol. 2. Београд-Никшић: Историјски институт, Манастир Острог.
