= Jovanka Stanojević =

Serbian painter (born 1979)

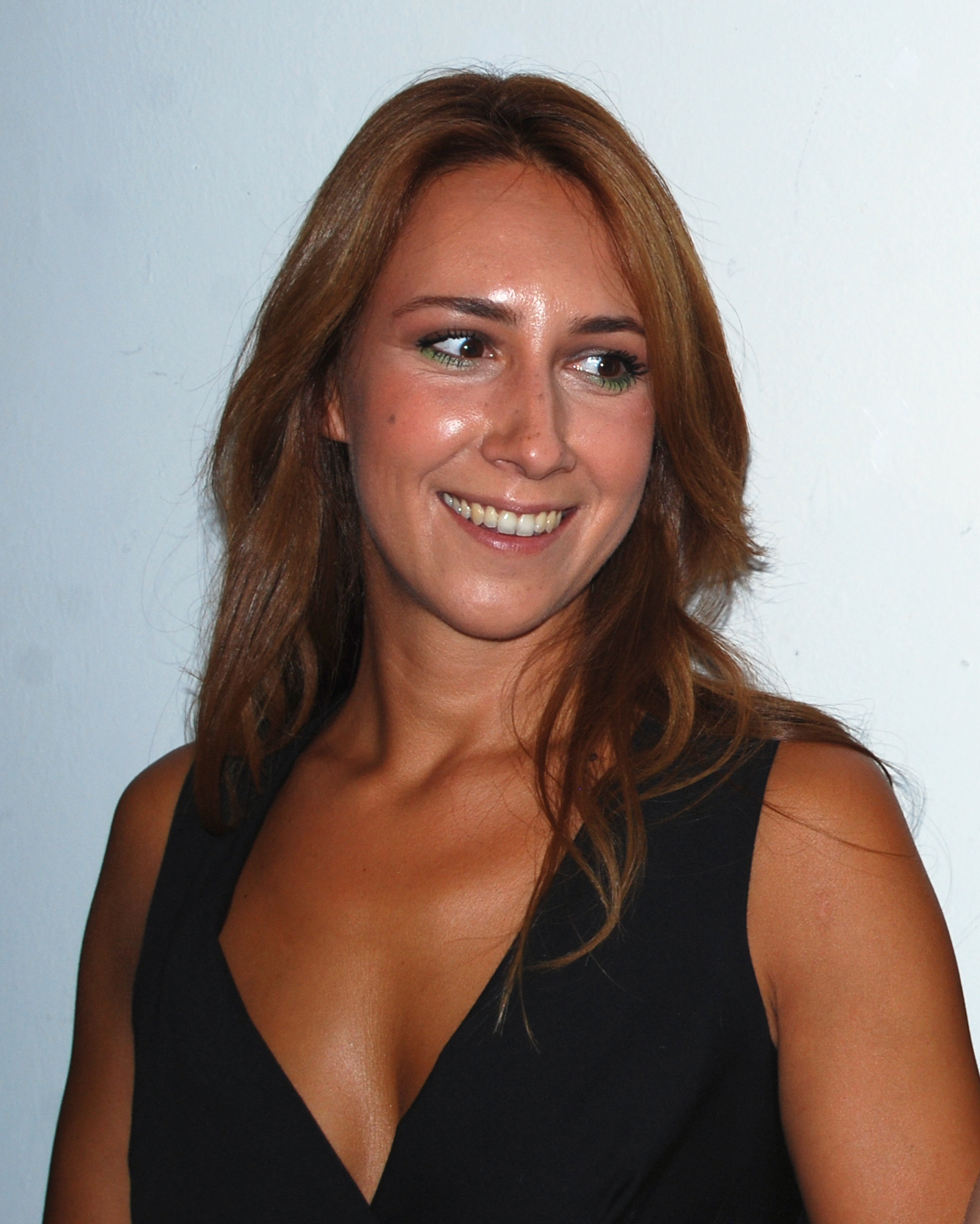
- Stanojević in 2014.
- Born: June 11, 1979 (age 46); Belgrade, Socialist Federal Republic of Yugoslavia
- Known for: Painting
- Website: http://jovankastanojevic.weebly.com

Jovanka Stanojević (Serbian Cyrillic: Јованка Станојевић, born 11 June 1979) is a Serbian painter.

== Biography and career ==
Born in Belgrade in 1979, Stanojević obtained a Bachelor of Arts in fine arts in 2005 and a Master of Fine Arts in drawing in 2009. She is currently completing her Ph.D. dissertation at the Faculty of Fine Arts in Belgrade. Since 2008, Stanojević worked as an assistant professor at the Faculty of Art and Design, John Nasibitt University of Belgrade. Since 2015 works as an assistant professor at the Academy of Fine Arts Trebinje, University of East Sarajevo, Bosnia and Herzegovina.

She had exhibitions in Serbia, United Kingdom (Derwent Art Prize), Switzerland, Spain (Guasch Coranty International Painting Prize 2012), Greece (ArTower Agora 2006, Art Athina 2010), Germany (Nordart 2013, 2014 and 2015), Austria, Hungary, Italy, and received a number of painting awards (including: Second Prize of Derwent Art Prize 2018, two Public Choice Awards at the Kunstwerk Carlshütte NordArt 2014 and 2013 in Büdelsdorf, First Prize for Drawing, Vladimir Velickovic Foundation, Grand Prix Milena 2007 at the 11th biennial In the light of Milena, Milena Pavlović-Barili Foundation, 2nd prize at the Exhibition of the Young 2011, Niš Art Foundation and Philip Morris Industry Art Foundation).

Stanojević won residencies at the International School of Painting, Drawing and Sculpture in Montecastello, Italy (2004) and at the Outside Project in Florence (2007).

== Art ==
Stanojević's paintings often consist of highly detailed, close-up portraits. An artistic interest inclined toward less glorified aspects of everyday life led Stanojević to depict subjects possessing greatness not related to social status or physical beauty, such as in hairstyles and enlarged female heads

== Exhibitions ==
=== Solo exhibitions (selection) ===
- 2017 – Faces, Drina Gallery, Belgrade
- 2016 – Municipal Gallery (Δημοτική Πινακοθήκη της Κέρκυρας), Corfu, Greece
- 2014 – Palazzo Pretorio, Sansepolcro, Italy
- 2014 – Cultural Center Novi Sad, Serbia
- 2009 – Gallery 73, Belgrade, Serbia
- 2007 – Gallery of the Ilija M. Kolarac Foundation, Belgrade
- 2007 – Center for Study in Cultural Development, Belgrade
- 2006 – ArTower Agora, Athens, Greece
- 2005 – DKSG, Belgrade
- 2004 – Center for Study in Cultural Development, Belgrade
- 2003 – Center for Study in Cultural Development, Belgrade
- 2002 – Faculty of Fine Arts Gallery, Belgrade

=== Group exhibitions (selection) ===
- 2018 – Derwent Art Prize, Mall Galleries, London; Trowbridge Arts, Wiltshire, UK
- 2018 – Likovna Jesen, Cultural Centre Laza Kostić, Sombor
- 2017 – Laureates of Vladimir Veličković Prize for Drawing Achievements, Haos Gallery, Belgrade
- 2017 – Delirium, Stalla Madulain, Zurich, Switzerland
- 2016 – 56th October Salon – The Pleasure of Love, Belgrade City Museum
- 2016 – Cukaricki Likovni Salon, Gallery 73, Belgrade
- 2016 – Like There is No Tomorrow, Drina Gallery
- 2015 – NordArt 2015, Kunstwerk Carlshütte, Büdelsdorf, Germany
- 2014 – NordArt 2014, Kustwerk Carlshütte, Büdelsdorf, Germany
- 2014 – BelgradeNow, Vorlarlberg Museum, Map Kellergalerie and Kunstforum Montefon, Schruns, Austria
- 2013 – Serbian Artists, Graphisoft Park, Budapest, Hungary
- 2013 – NordArt 2013, Kunstwerk Carlshütte, Büdelsdorf, Germany
- 2013 – The Exhibition of the Young 2013, Niš Art Foundation – Philip Morris International, Philip Morris Industry, Niš, Serbia
- 2013 – Project Old Age, Association Laundry (Belgrade), Art Encounters (Museum of Modern Art Subotica), Gallery Nadežda Petrović (Čačak) and Cultural Centre of Belgrade
- 2012 – Guasch Coranty International Painting Prize 2012 – Finalists, Centre d’Art Tecla Sala, Barcelona, Spain
- 2012 – International Exhibition of Contemporary Drawing, Swiss Art Space, Lausanne, Switzerland
- 2012 – December Exhibition, ULUS, Belgrade
- 2011 – The Exhibition of the Young 2011, Niš Art Foundation – Philip Morris International, Philip Morris Industry, Niš
- 2011 – XV Spring Annual, Art Gallery of Cultural Center of Čačak, Serbia
- 2010 – Art Athina 2010, Athens
- 2010 – Work in Progress – Art Collection Šumatovčka , Belgrade
- 2010 – The Exhibition of the Young 2010, Niš Art Foundation – Philip Morris International, Philip Morris Industry, Niš
- 2010 – Private Collection – Ljubomir Eric, Art Pavilion Cvijeta Zuzorić, Belgrade
- 2009 – Zlatibor 2008, Art Gallery RTS, Belgrade
- 2009 – December Exhibition, ULUS, Belgrade
- 2008 – Exhibition of Purchased Works of Art in the Field of Fine and Applied Arts, Gallery Magacin, Belgrade
- 2008 – Autumn Exhibition, ULUS, Art Pavilion Cvijeta Zuzorić, Belgrade
- 2008 – XIII Easter Eggs Auction, Gallery Pero, Belgrade
- 2007 – Čukarički Likovni Salon, Gallery 73, Belgrade
- 2007 – 11. International Biennial "In the Light of Milena", Gallery of Milena Pavlović–Barili, Požarevac, Serbia
- 2007 – Annual Exhibition, Gallery of the Ilija M. Kolarac Foundation, Belgrade
- 2007 – XXI Century Presents, Blok Gallery, Belgrade
- 2007 – View, Drawing, Attitude V, Cultural Center of Novi Sad, Novi Sad, Serbia
- 2007 – 8. Biennial of Drawings and Small Scale Sculpture, Art Pavilion Cvijeta Zuzorić
- 2007 – De Natura East – West, ArTower Agora, Athens
- 2007 – View, Drawing, Attitude IV, Gallery 73, Belgrade
- 2007 – Spring Exhibition, ULUS, Art Pavilion Cvijeta Zuzorić, Belgrade
- 2006 – New Members of Association of Fine Artists of Serbia (ULUS), Art Pavilion Cvijeta Zuzorić, Belgrade
- 2005 – Studies of Diligence, Gallery Zlatno Oko, Novi Sad
- 2004 – Studies of Diligence, Cultural Centre of Belgrade
- 2004 – The Awarded Students' Exhibition 2003/2004, Faculty of Fine Arts Gallery, Belgrade
- 2004 – Readers in Čačak, in cooperation with publishing house CLIO, Čačak

=== Awards ===
- 2018 – SECOND PRIZE, Derwent Art Prize 2018
- 2018 – MILAN KONJOVIĆ AWARD, Likovna Jesen, Sombor
- 2016 – "FIRST PRIZE", Vladimir Velickovic Foundation, Belgrade
- 2014 – "PUBLIC CHOICE AWARD", NordArt 2014 - Kunstwerk Carlshütte, Germany
- 2013 – "PUBLIC CHOICE AWARD", NordArt 2013 - Kunstwerk Carlshütte, Germany
- 2011 – "SECOND PRIZE", Nis Art Foundation - Philip Morris International, Nis
- 2011 – The City Library „Vladislav Petkovic – Dis“ Award, XV Spring Annual, Cacak
- 2007 – GRAND PRIX "MILENA", 11. International Biennial "IN THE LIGHT OF MILENA"
- 2007 – "THE BEST SOLO EXHIBITION IN THE SEASON OF 2006/2007", Ilija M. Kolarac Foundation, Belgrade
- 2006 – "THE BEST NEW MEMBER OF ASSOCIATION OF FINE ARTISTS OF SERBIA (ULUS)"
- 2004 – "RISTA I BETA VUKANOVIC - for painting achievements"

=== Residencies and Art Symposiums ===
- 2015 – Nord Art Sympozium, Kunstwerk Carlshütte, Germany
- 2014 – Nord Art Sympozium, Kunstwerk Carlshütte, Germany
- 2013 – LindArt, Lendava, Slovenia
- 2007 – Outside Project, Florence
- 2007 – Colony of RTS, Zlatibor, Serbia
- 2004 – International School of Painting, Drawing and Sculpture, Montecastello, Italy
