= Stanojković =

Stanojković is a South Slavic patronymic surname derived from the male given name Stanoje. Notable people with the surname include:

- Vujadin Stanojković (born 1963), Yugoslav and Macedonian professional footballer and manager
- Jovan Stanojković, better known as Jovan Dovezenski (1873–1935), Serbian military commander, participant in the Balkan Wars

Martija Stanojković, Macedonian singer
