= Stanoje Stanojević =

Serbian historian

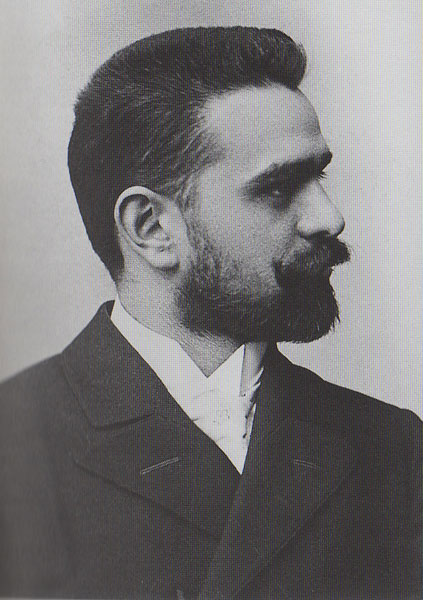
- 1902 photograph of Stanojević
- Born: Stanjoe Stanojević; 13 August 1874; Novi Sad, Serbia
- Died: 30 July 1937 (aged 62); Vienna, Austria
- Occupation: historian

Stanoje Stanojević (Serbian Cyrillic: Станоје Станојевић; 13 August 1874 – 30 July 1937) was a Serbian historian, university professor, academic and a leader of many scientific and publishing enterprises.

== Career ==
Stanojević finished university studies in Belgrade's Velika škola and post-graduate studies in philosophy in Vienna, where he received his PhD in 1896. He was a student of Konstantin Jireček and Vatroslav Jagić. Stanojević belongs to the first generation of Serbian historians educated abroad, at European universities. From 1898 to 1899 he was professor at the Serbian high school in Istanbul and also worked at the Russian Archaeological Institute there, where he laid the foundations for his two-volume work Vizantija i Srbi (Byzantium and the Serbs), published from 1903 to 1906.

In 1900, he lectured and years later became a professor of the Velika škola (University of Belgrade), his alma mater. During Austro-Hungarian occupation of Serbia in World War I, Stanojević escaped to Sankt Petersburg, where he taught at the university as a visiting professor. In 1917, he lectured at Sorbonne and in 1918 at the University of London. After the war, in 1919, Stanojević resumed his chair as professor of National History at the University of Belgrade until 1937, the time of his death.

He was fluent in Latin, Greek, Old Church Slavonic and major European languages. His basic orientation was the medieval history of Serbia and the Serbian lands, primarily the early Middle Ages and the time of the Nemanjić dynasty. He was one of the founders of the Byzantine studies in Serbia. He authored six hundred and sixteen works, and the most popular are Byzantium and the Serbs and The History of the Serbian People.

He was also the editor of the first Popular Serbian-Croatian-Slovenian Encyclopaedia published by the Bibliographical Institute in Zagreb. Stanojević organized himself and initiated the establishment of historic societies. He was a member of the Serbian Academy of Sciences and Arts and a corresponding member of science academies in Bucharest, Prague and Munich.

== Works ==
Stanojević wrote many books about history of Serbia and history of the Serbs, including:

- Byzantium and the Serbs ("Vizantija i Srbi")
- Saint Sava ("Sveti Sava")
- Stefan Lazarević's biography ("Biografija Stefana Lazarevića od Konstantina filozofa")
- Studies on Serbian diplomacy ("Studije o srpskoj diplomatici")
- World War 1 serbia
- History of the Serbian People ("Istorija srpskog naroda")
- About South Slavs in the 6th, 7th, 8th centuries ("O Južnim Slovenima u VI, VII, VIII veku")
- From our past ("Iz naše prošlosti"), 1934

He also organized and arranged the "Great National Encyclopedia of Serbs, Croats and Slovenes" ("Velika Narodna enciklopedija Srba, Hrvata i Slovenaca"), which was the first work of the kind written in Serbian language.

- Great National Encyclopedia of Serbs, Croats and Slovenes 1
- Great National Encyclopedia of Serbs, Croats and Slovenes 2
- Great National Encyclopedia of Serbs, Croats and Slovenes 3
- Great National Encyclopedia of Serbs, Croats and Slovenes 4
