= Stanojevići =

- Village
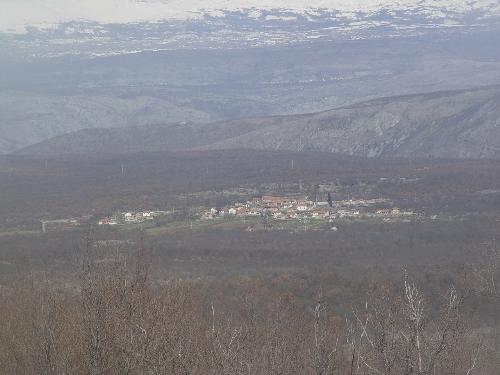
- Stanojevići

- Location within Bosnia and Herzegovina
- Country: Bosnia and Herzegovina
- Entity: Federation of Bosnia and Herzegovina
- Canton: Herzegovina-Neretva
- Municipality: Čapljina

Area
  - Total: 3.32 sq mi (8.60 km^{2})

Population (2013)
  - Total: 108
  - Density: 32.5/sq mi (12.6/km^{2})
- Time zone: UTC+1 (CET)
  - Summer (DST): UTC+2 (CEST)

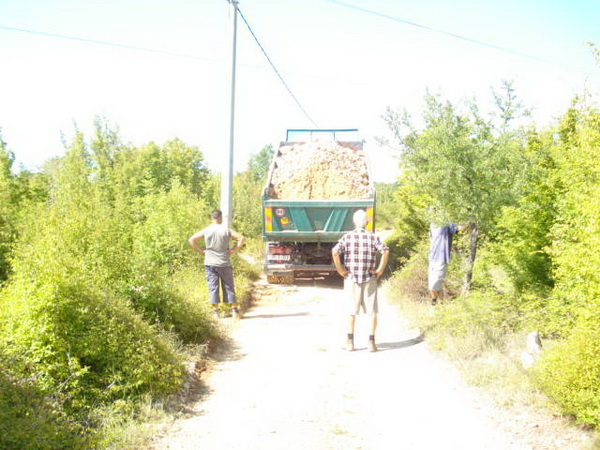
Stanojevići

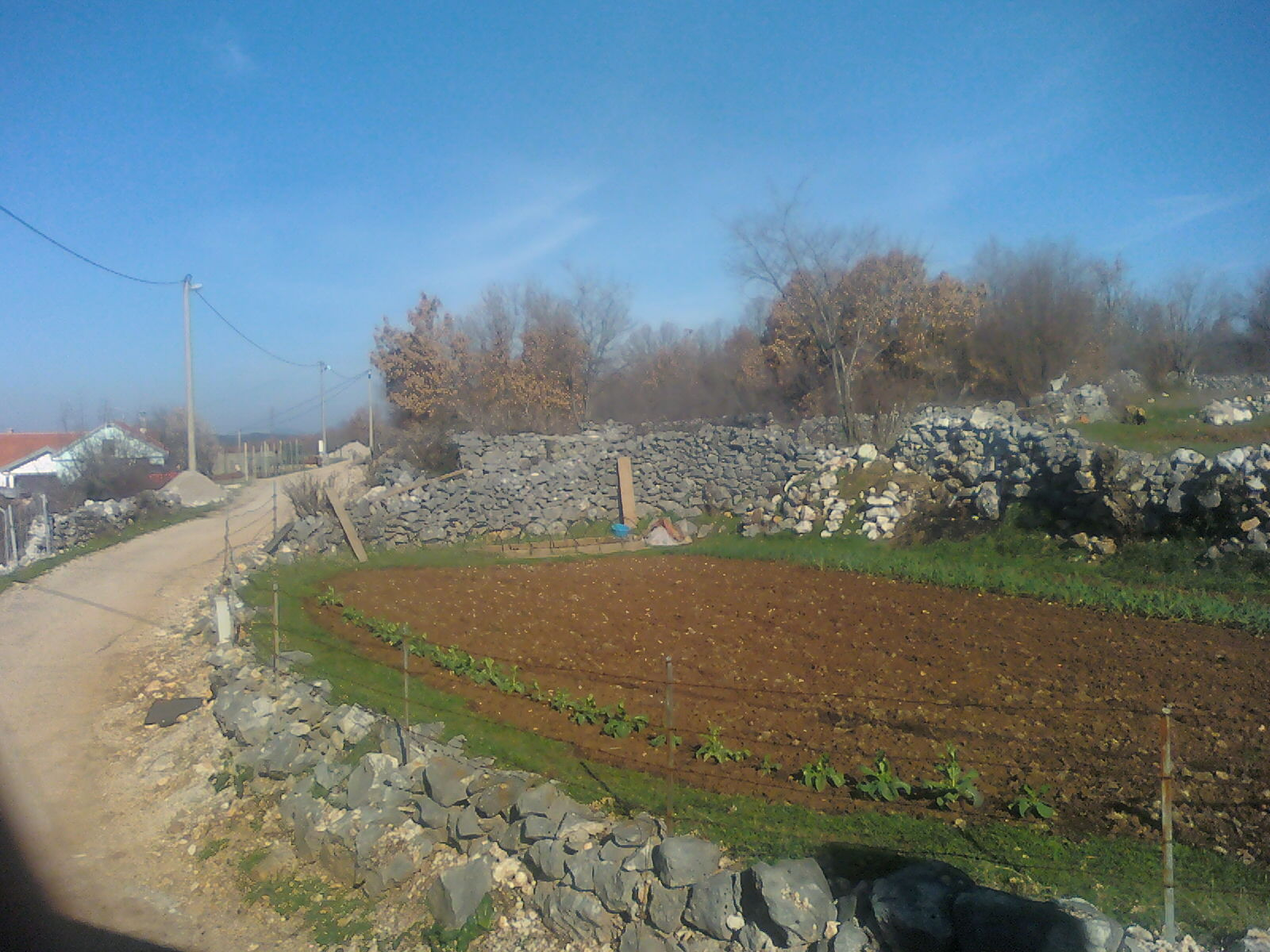
Stanojevići

Stanojevići is a village in Bosnia and Herzegovina. According to the 1991 census, the village is located in the municipality of Čapljina.

== Demographics ==
According to the 2013 census, its population was 108.

Ethnicity in 2013
Ethnicity	Number	Percentage
Bosniaks	100	92.6%
Croats	8	7.4%
Total	108	100%
