= Romanian philosophy =

Philosophy done in Romania or by Romanians

Romanian philosophy is the entirety of philosophy written by Romanian authors. The term can also be used to refer to all philosophy written in the Romanian language or to works of philosophers native to the region of Romania before the country's formation.

== Historical outline ==
=== Beginnings ===
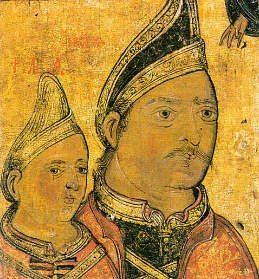
Wallachian prince Neagoe Basarab and his son, Theodosius

The first broadly philosophical texts attested on the Romanian territory are the Patristic writings. Among this corpus of texts, in Church Slavonic translations, the most important are the works of Dionysius the Pseudo-Areopagite and the Dialectics of St. John Damascene. Excerpts from ancient philosophers circulated also. The only notable indigenous production of the epoch is The Teachings of Neagoe Basarab to his Son, Theodosius, written around 1521. The book is a compilation of patristic and biblical sources, with many moral and political reflections, from an ascetic viewpoint. It illustrates Byzantine theocracy and proposes the model of a prince-monk.

=== 17th century ===
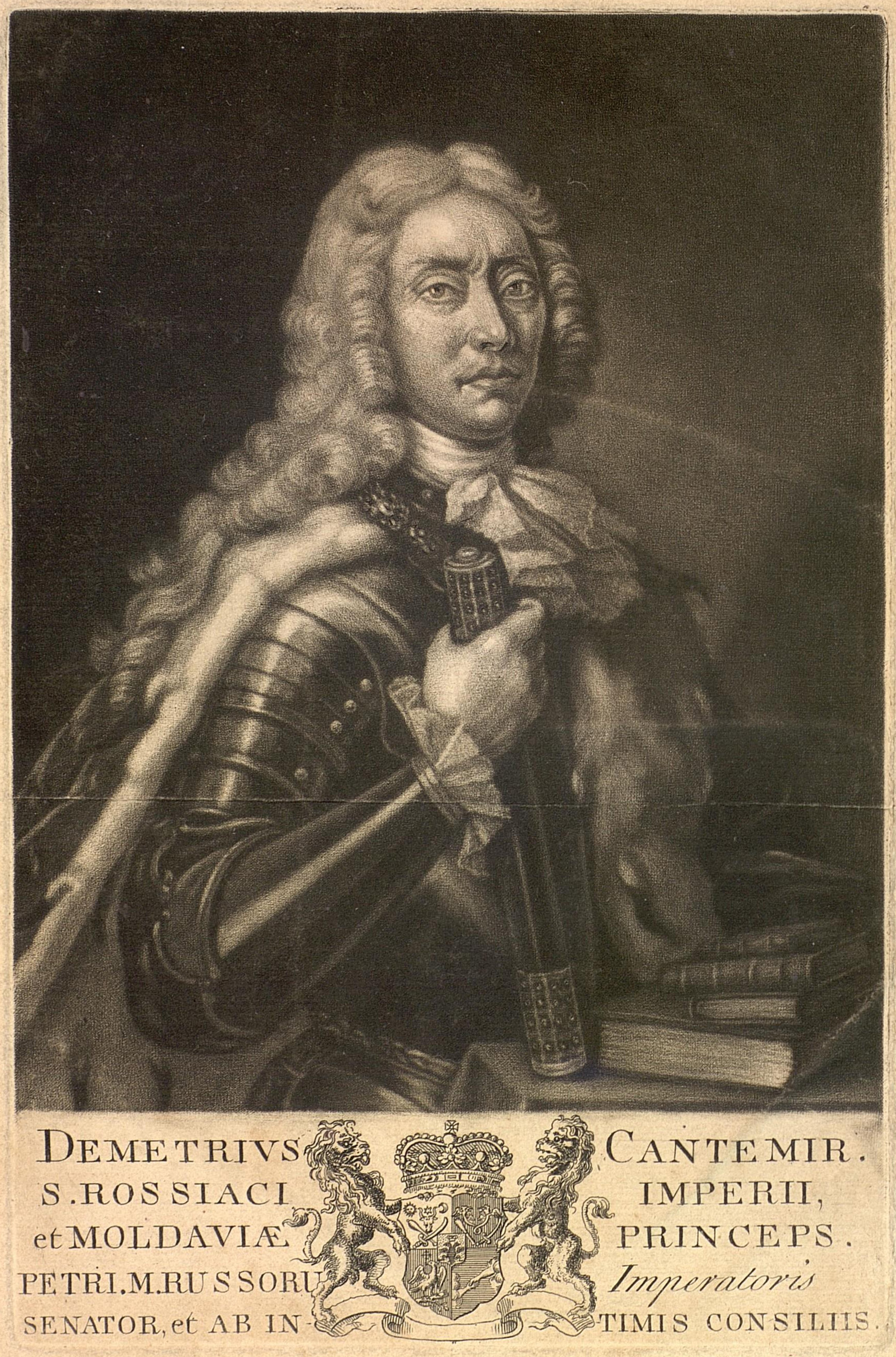
Dimitrie Cantemir, Moldavian philosopher and prince

In the middle of the 17th century, Romanian acquired the status of a liturgical language alongside Greek and Slavonic, and began to develop a philosophical vocabulary. Nicolae Milescu (1638–1708) authored the first translation of a philosophical text into Romanian (the treatise On the Dominant Reason of Pseudo-Josephus Flavius, translated towards 1688). Miron Costin (1633–1691) wrote the first philosophical poem in Romanian, Viaţa lumii (The Life of the World) (1672), an ethical reflection on earthly happiness. The most important philosophical production of this century is The Divan (1698) of Dimitrie Cantemir (1673–1723), a philosophical treatise which supports Orthodox ethics with rational arguments. This treatise was translated into Arabic for the use of the Syrian Christians, and, later, into Bulgarian.

Some philosophical texts were written in Latin. Gavril Ivul (1619–1678), a Jesuit who taught philosophy in the University of Vienna, wrote a logical treatise, Propositiones ex universa logica (1654). Cantemir authored a textbook of logic and a treatise of "theologo-physics", Sacrosanctae scientiae indepingibilis imago (1700) which, besides discussing the nature of time, and the problem of the universals, tries to justify Biblical cosmogony with non-theological arguments drawing on the philosophy of Jan Baptist van Helmont. He left also a text on the philosophy of history, Monarchiarum physica examinatio.

=== 18th century ===
In the 18th century, the dominant philosophy in Moldavia and Walachia was the neo-Aristotelianism of Theophilos Corydalleus, which was in fact the Paduan neo-Aristotelianism of Zabarella, Pomponazzi and Cremonini. Towards the last quarter of the century, this was challenged by the spread of rationalism (Christian Wolff) and empiricism (John Locke). Important figures may be considered Samuel Micu (1745–1806) in Transylvania, and Iosif Moisiodax (1730–1800) in Moldavia. The first translated intensively from the Wolffian Baumeister, implicitly promoting the German Enlightenment. The last contributed to the modernization of the philosophical curriculum in the Princely Academies. He wrote an essay called The Apology, appealing for modern European philosophy and against the old Aristotelian Chorydaleian scholasticism. The philosophical language of this century was mostly Greek. One notable exception was the clucer Ioan Geanetu (Jean Zanetti), who published in 1787, in Greek and French, a treatise called Réfutation du traité d'Ocellus de la nature de l'univers. In this work he criticised an ancient conception regarding the eternity of the universe, in order to reinforce the faith of his correligionaries.

=== 19th century ===
The 19th century can be divided from the point of view of a history of philosophy into three periods: that of the final days of the Phanariote regime, that of the restoration of the Romanian dynasties and, finally, that of Charles I, who came from a foreign dynasty (Hohenzollern).

==== The End of the Phanariote Regime ====
In the first two decades of the 19th century the most prominent philosophers in the Romanian Principalities were still the Greek professors of the Princely Academies, including Lambros Photiades, Konstantinos Vardalachos, Neophyte Doucas and Benjamin Lesvios in Bucharest, as well as Daniel Philippidis, Stephanos Doungas and Dimitrios Panayotou Govdelas in Iași. Some of them were alumni of the Academies from the Principalities, as Vardalachos, who studied with Photiades, himself an ancient student of the Princely Academy from Bucharest. Daniel Philippidis also studied at this Academy in the 1780s, under the philologist Neophyte Cavsocalyvitis. With the exception of Photiades, they had also studied in major Western universities. Doungas, for example, was a student of Friedrich Wilhelm Joseph Schelling. In his Physics he tried to reconcile the dogmatic Orthodox theology with the science of nature, following Schelling's system.

==== The Epoch of the Restored Autochthonous Dynasties ====
After 1821, the ruling Princes were once again elected by local noblemen i.e. the boyars (and validated by the Sultan). Greek was replaced in the Academies with Romanian.

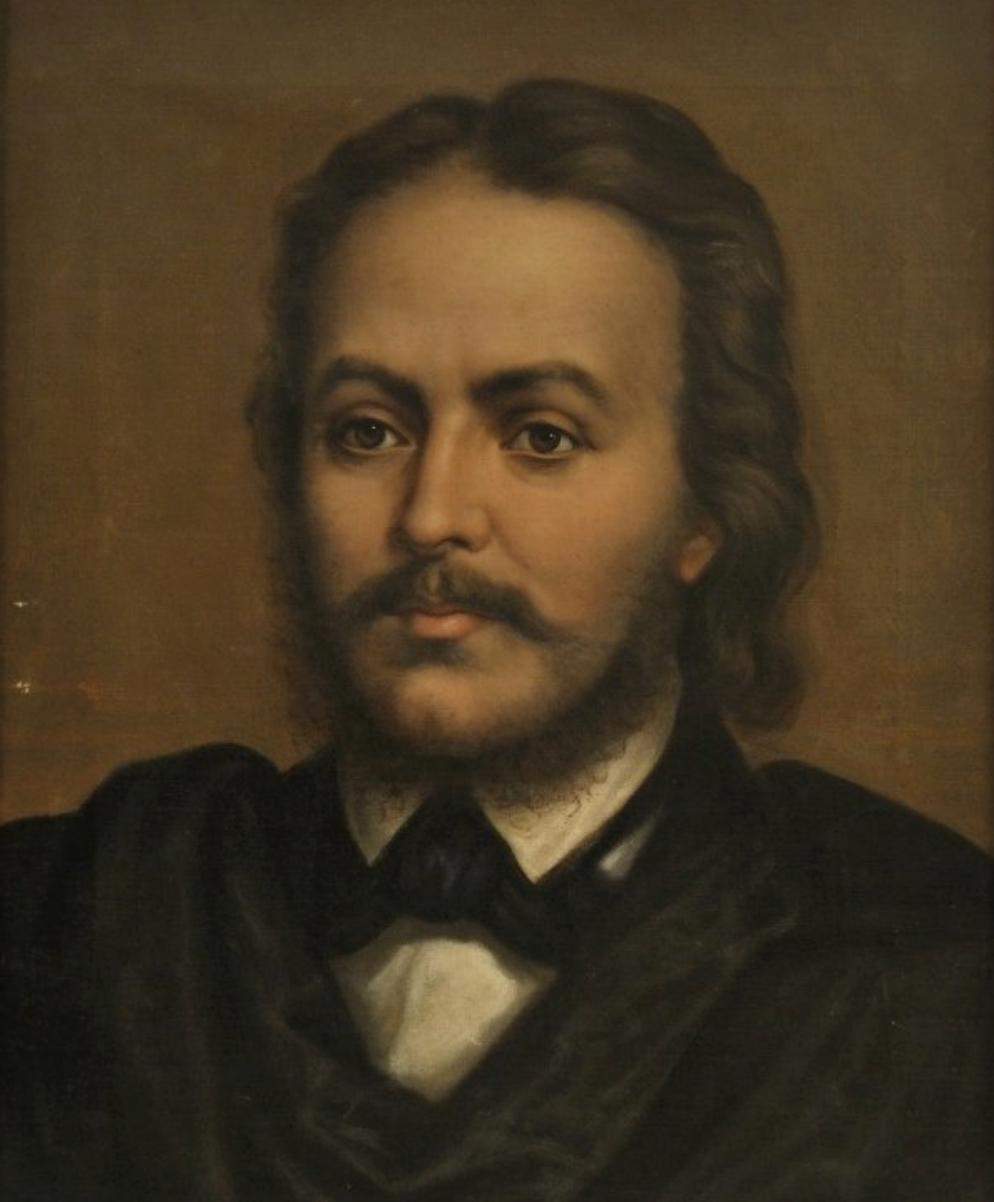
Gheorghe Lazăr, an early Kantian

As early as 1818 the Transylvanian Gheorghe Lazăr (1779–1821), who studied in Vienna, began teaching philosophy in Romanian in the Greek-speaking Academy. According to one of his students, Ion Heliade Rădulescu, his courses were based on Kantian philosophy. For didactical purposes he decided to make a Romanian translation of some of Krug's works, which he subsequently used as a textbook. Krug's Handbook of Philosophy and Philosophical Literature was translated in the first period of the 19th century another three times, by August Treboniu Laurian, Timotei Cipariu and Simeon Barnutiu.

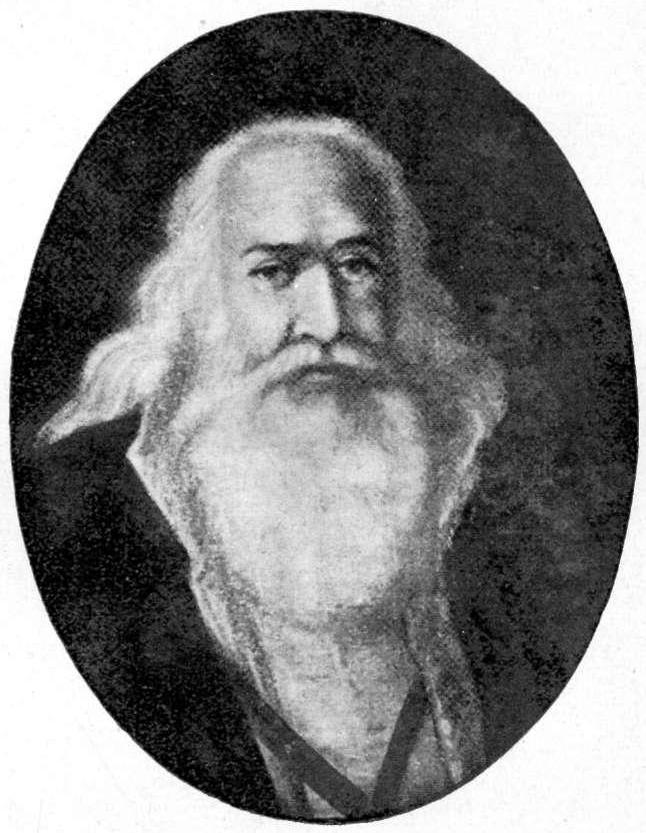
Eufrosin Poteca, Enlightenment philosopher

Eufrosin Poteca (1786–1858) studied in the Princely Academy from Bucharest with Vardalachos, Doukas and Lesvios and at the universities of Pisa and Paris (1820–1825). Eufrosin Poteca taught philosophy at the Saint Sava Academy, and was a translator of philosophical and theological works. His own philosophy was influenced by the Sensualism of Condillac, de Tracy and Soave, by Rousseau's political philosophy and by his strong Christian beliefs. He maintained that there are three metaphysical first principles, body, soul and spirit, studied by three distinct sciences: physics (the study of unanimated bodies), psychology (the study of animated things) and ideology (in the sense of de Tracy, the science of ideas). In his philosophy the whole universe displays this triadic structure, as it is permeated by matter, life and logos. He identified the laws of nature with the laws of God, and he drew from this conception many moral conclusions, e.g. the lack of foundation of celibacy. He thought that the foundation of all morals, politics and rights is the golden rule. From here he argued against slavery, and as a result was exiled to a Gura Motrului monastery, where he lived until the end of his life.

Ionică Tăutul (1798–1828) was a Moldavian boyar educated at home by some French refugees. He quoted Locke, Rousseau, Montesquieu, Voltaire, but also obscure writers such as Sabatier de Castre. His ideas were disseminated mostly in his correspondence and political pamphlets but also in works like Construction of Politics according to Human Nature or Essay against Deists and Materialists. His intention was to build a political theory starting from a Christian anthropology of the state of nature. The political system to be justified by such a procedure was an "aristo-democratic republic". The second essay, whose title is inspired by Mersenne, criticizes the materialist vision of the man-machine (La Mettrie) on the basis of a rather Paulinic doctrine of the "amphibian" character of man, character which clearly distinguishes him from the natural world.

Alexandru Hâjdeu (1811–1872) was a student of Friedrich Wilhelm Joseph Schelling in Berlin. Although very proud of his Moldavian origin, he was an ardent Russian patriot, since he lived in Bessarabia, the Moldavian territory annexed by Russia. His philosophy was concerned with the destiny of Russia, and he was a slavophil and a messianist. He argued for the development of a purely Russian philosophy, emerging from the careful study of the Russian language. According to him, only such a philosophy could be national, an only this way the Russian element could be brought to universality. The way to arrive at such a philosophy is to continue the thinking of Skovoroda, the only authentic Russian philosopher up to then, which would fulfil the moment of existence for itself of the Russian nation.

Ioan Zalomit (1820–1885) studied philosophy in France and in Germany, at Berlin, with Victor Cousin and Friedrich Wilhelm Joseph Schelling. He obtained here the title of doctor of philosophy with a thesis on Kant (1848). In his inaugural dissertation, Zalomit tried to overcome the Kantian opposition between laws of nature and moral laws. He affirmed that liberty is inherent to nature, so that the moral laws are in fact laws of nature. All the moral actions are thus the result of a "duty towards nature" and it is only this way that a rational theodicy is possible.

Simeon Bărnuțiu (1808–1864) taught philosophy at Blaj College, at Mihaileana Academy and, finally, at University of Iași. His remaining published courses are mostly adaptations after Krug. He was the first Romanian philosopher preoccupied with the philosophy of law. He considered Romanian law to be a direct continuation of Roman law and advocated for a return to Roman law principles, as well as for the introduction of Latin neologisms in Romanian language. His political activity was centered around the rights of Romanians in Transylvania, and his philosophical views were employed in the defense of his political stances several times, including in Blaj Pronouncement. The main arguments were based on the principle of natural law.

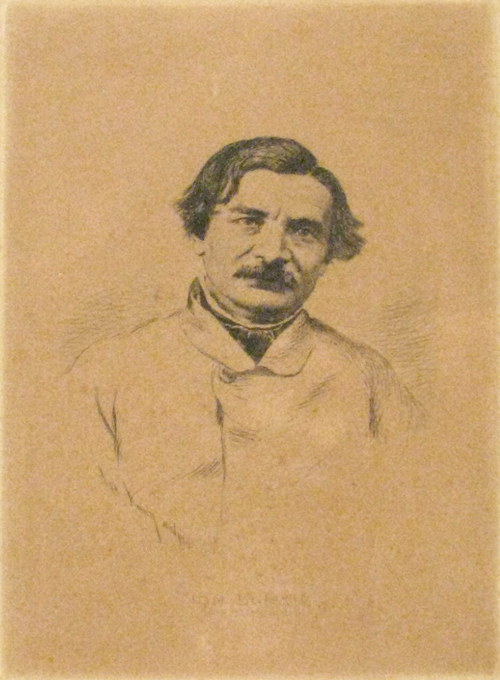
Ion Heliade Rădulescu's portrait by Theodor Aman

Ion Heliade Rădulescu (1802–1872) studied at the Princely Academy from Bucharest, under Constantin Vardalah, and from 1818 the Romanian classes of Gheorghe Lazăr. After the death of Lazăr he became a teacher in the Academy and he had a prodigious activity as a cultural animator. In 1828 he published an "almost philosophical" (in his words) Gramatica românească (Romanian Grammar), influenced by Condillac, which he knew from his Greek teachers. After the turmoil of the 1848 Revolution, Heliade Rădulescu comes up with a philosophical system, inspired from kabala and the socialism of Proudhon and Fourier. There are also traces of Hegel's influence, but not directly read (he knew him probably from the works of Cousin). His two most important works are Historia critică universală (The Universal Critical History) and Equilibru între antithesi sau Spiritul şi materia (Equilibrium between Antitheses).

Heliade Rădulescu proposed, against monisms and dualisms of all kind, a trinitarian philosophy. He affirmed that all philosophical concepts come in dualities, which can be classified in two categories: sympathetic (or parallel) and antipathetic. A sympathetic duality is formed by two "positive" terms, which indicate an existence: time / space; spirit / matter; right / duty etc. An antipathetic duality contains a positive and a negative term: life / death; movement / inertia; good / evil. Each sympathetic duality produces a third term, through which the dualism is overcome in the form of active principle – passive principle – (generate) a result, for example: spirit / matter / universe; form / substance / body; progress / conservation / perfectibility; spiritual man / physical man / moral man. Beginning from here, Heliade Rădulescu developed a kind of cosmology. In his view, the spirit, being immaterial, can only come into contact with the matter through the mediation of the matter's most immaterial parts.

==== The Epoch of Charles I (Carol I) ====
In 1860 and 1864 Prince Alexandru Ioan Cuza founded the Universities of Iași and Bucharest, and in 1866 Karl von Hohenzollern-Sigmaringen became, under the name Carol I, Domnitor of the Principality of Romania, which would later become the Kingdom of Romania. Almost at the same time, in 1863, the "Junimnea" literary society was founded in Iași.

The last thirty years of the 19th century were culturally dominated by the Junimea society. Founded in 1863 by Titu Maiorescu (1840–1917) and Petre P. Carp (1837-1919), Vasile Conta (1846–1882), Alexandru Xenopol (1847–1920), Mihai Eminescu (1850–1889), Constantin Leonardescu (1844–1907), Ioan Pop Florantin (1843–1926).

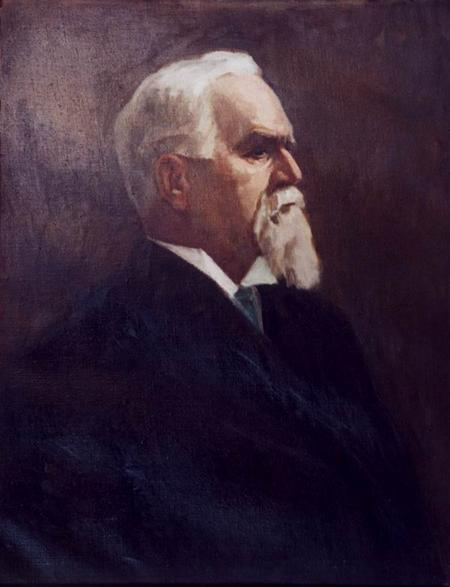
Titu Maiorescu

Titu Maiorescu studied the philosophy at Theresianum between 1851 and 1858, under the guidance of H. Suttner who introduced him to Herbart's philosophy. He obtained his two doctorates from the University of Giessen, and later from the University of Paris. His first philosophical paper was Einiges Philosophische in gemeinfasslicher Form (1860), written under the influence of Herbart and Feuerbach. He became a member of Berlin Philosophical Society, which represented Hegelianism. Returning to his country in November 1861, he held lectures on logic and history of philosophy at the University of Iasi (1863–1871) and University of Bucharest (1884–1907), where his students included Constantin Rădulescu-Motru, Ion Petrovici, P. P. Negulescu, Mircea Florian.

In his early works he started from Herbart's idea of logical validity being restricted to objects in a reciprocal relation. From here, Maiorescu developed an epistemological view based on relationship. Philosophy would then be the study of the relation between things, a relation that is not in the object itself, but in the mind. Following Harbert's method, he proposed a mechanical description of the mind and of philosophy, ordered on five fundamental categories, from the most concrete to the most abstract: psychology, logic, metaphysic, mathematic, and ethic. In the second part of his life his focus changed to the Romanian philosophy and its natural development, starting with his În contra direcției de astăzi în cultura română (Against Today's Direction in Romanian Culture) (1868), influenced by Herbert Spencer. Consequently, he criticized the practice of re-latinization of the language promoted by the Transylvanian School, as well as Simion Bărnuțiu's reliance on Roman jurisprudence. His theory of forme fără fond (forms without a basis) entered national culture. The theory states that every national culture has a distinct spirituality basis upon which it forms its own elements, and when these elements are adopted from another cultural context, the forms become harmful. In Maiorescu's view, generations like those involved in 1848 events adopted Western cultural elements without proper consideration to the national basis, and, in consequence, Romanian culture was suffocated with forms which it could not interiorize since they did not belong to its cultural base.

Vasile Conta obtained his doctorate from the Université libre de Bruxelles and functioned as a Professor of Law at the University of Iași. His works, published in Romanian and French, included La théorie du fatalisme (1877) and La théorie de l'ondulation universelle (1895). Conta was influenced by three sources: the evolutionist philosophy of Herbert Spencer, the positivism of Auguste Comte, and the German materialism of Büchner, Vogt, and Moleschott. In his first work he defends a version of determinism, called "fatalism", and proposes a materialist theory of knowledge (or rather, a materialist model of cognition). Cognition is accounted for in terms of material modifications of the brain. He thought that sensorial input is transmitted through the nervous fibres under the form of "shakings", or vibrations, which provoke the apparition of physiological changes in the brain, called "imprintings". In the second cited work, Conta proposes a materialist metaphysics, affirming the wave-like character of the universe; according to this conception, the evolution of the universe as a whole, and of each entity in this universe has a wave-like character. Conta wrote also books on the history of metaphysics, on the nature of metaphysics, on the "first principles that constitute the world". He dissociated from the positivists of his time by arguing for the importance of metaphysics and for the presence of an artistic element in the construction of the metaphysical systems.

Alexandru Xenopol, historian and philosopher, had two doctorates, one of them in philosophy, conferred from the University of Giessen. His philosophy emerged from his constant preoccupations with history He draws a distinction between facts of repetition, and facts of succession. The facts of repetition are studied by the natural sciences, and are characterized by natural laws. The facts of succession are studied by the sciences of the spirit, notably by history, and they are not subsumed to any law, but they form series. For Xenopol historical series are causal, and can be explained as the result of other interconnected series of historical events, but they are not predictable. He also discussed the concept of causality, the notion of hypothesis and of the verification of hypothesis.

Constantin Leonardescu studied at the Universities of Bucharest and Paris, and was a professor of philosophy in the University of Iași. Generally, he was influenced by the French eclecticism and he had a thoroughly "scientific" attitude in philosophy. Leonardescu had a great interest in psychology, science which he tried to apply to diverse domains of philosophy, such as epistemology and aesthetics. His list of published books includes Philosophy Face to the Progress of Positive Sciences (1876), Metaphysics, Religion and Science (1884), The Principles of Psychology (1892), The Inductive Morals or the Science of the Human Behaviour (1885).

Ioan Pop Florantin, studied philosophy and philology at the University of Vienna, taught philosophy in several high-schools in Iași. He authored several books on logic, psychology, and general philosophy, as well as the first Romania treatise on aesthetics. He advanced also a personal conception called "the universal consecutionism", according to which nothing is at it appears at a certain moment, but a sequence of actions that we perceive as activities, rather than static concepts.

Prince Grigore Sturdza (1821–1901) published some philosophical works in French, of which Les lois fondamentales de l'Univers (1891) is the most important. The book's subject-matter is primarily astronomy, or scientific cosmology, which eventually served as a basis for metaphysical speculations.

Outside the borders of the Principality, later Kingdom, of Romania,Vasile Lucaciu (1852–1922), of Greek-catholic confession, studied at Rome where he obtained his doctorate in theology and philosophy. He is the author of a Thomist philosophical system, Institutions of Philosophy, published between 1881 and 1884 in three volumes: Logic (1881), Metaphysics (1882), and Moral Philosophy (1884).

=== 20th century ===
During the 20th century, the history of Romanian philosophy can be divided in three periods: the pre-communist period, the communist period, and the post-communist period.

==== Monarchist period ====
Two major "schools" of philosophy produced, in the first half of the century, two peaks of Romanian philosophy: the school of Maiorescu, and the school of Nae Ionescu. Transylvanian philosophers form the third group due to their non-affiliation with the first two and their connections with each other. Apart from these three "schools" or orientations, there are many other authors, including the members of the Onicescu circle, characterised as analytic philosophers.

===== The Maiorescians =====
The "Maiorescians" are Constantin Rădulescu-Motru (1868–1957), P. P. Negulescu (1872–1951), Dumitru Draghicescu (1875–1945), Ion Petrovici (1882–1972), and Mircea Florian (1888–1960).

Constantin Rădulescu-Motru, the grandson of Eufrosin Poteca, called his philosophical system "Energetic Personalism", influenced by the Otswald's energetism and Stern's personalism. An expert in experimental psychology (he studied under Wundt in Leipzig, getting his doctorate with a dissertation on Kant), he followed the inductivist trend in metaphysics. The human personality was considered by him a superior form of energy, the final stage of the evolution of the universe. His metaphysics implies a political program as well as an ethics of labor. The purpose of the political life must be the transition from the "anarchic personalism" that governed the Romanian society to "energetic personalism". In his Timp şi destin (Time and Destiny) (1940) he started from the bergsonian distinction between objective and subjective time, adding a new category: time as destiny, a time of becoming.

P. P. Negulescu's reflections on the origin of culture were published in a two volume Filosofia Renașterii ("Renaissance Philosophy"), in Istoria filozofiei contemporane (The History of Contemporary Philosophy), and in Destinul omenirii (The Destiny of Humanity). Influenced early on by Spencer's empiricism, he remained convinced throughout his activity of the relativity of knowledge. A follower of the Maiorescu school of thought, he followed in his footsteps and taught philosophy at the Bucharest University after the Maiorescu's retirement.

Dumitru Drăghicescu obtained his licence in philosophy with a memoir on the Influence of Kant on Auguste Compte (1901) at the University of Bucharest, continuing his studies in Paris, where he did his doctorate with Durkheim, titled Du Rôle de l’individu dans le déterminisme social. He wrote on the rapport between social reality and biological determinism, theorizing that social acts are the outcomes of intention and volition and therefore biological determinism is in contrast and secondary to social determinism.

Ion Petrovici wrote on logic and metaphysics. In logic he contributed to the logical theory of notions, mainly regarding the relations between the intension and the extension of a term; he contradicted the law of their inverse dependence. In metaphysics he gave the lecture "The Idea of Nothingness" (1933), in which the nothingness was determined as a "transcendent substance", preceding existence and transcending it, but manifesting itself immanently in the existent things.

Mircea Florian, who studied in Germany with the Neokantian Rehmke, wrote about the history of philosophy and philosophical methodology, critique of the theory of knowledge, logic, datum and dodemenology, and the philosophy of recessivity. His results were published in the volume Philosophical Reconstruction (1943). He wrote in the 1960s a system of philosophy presented in a two-volume treatise called Recesivitatea ca structură a lumii (Recessivity as the Structure of the World). Inspired by an analogy with genetic biology, Florian arrives at the conclusion that experience is characterised by an invariant, the relation of recessivity that holds between two concepts. This relation is neither a relation of opposition, like the contrariety, nor one of concordance, like the subordination. It is a special relation which exhibits features of both types of inter-notional relation acknowledged by logic, and it is both a relation of subordination, and a relation of opposition. In a pair of concepts united by this relation, there is one which is hierarchically superior, called the "dominant" concept, and another which, although hierarchically inferior, is ontologically superior, called the "recessive" concept. In Florian's view every important concept of philosophy belongs to a pair which instantiates recessivity. He analyzed several dozens of such pairs for example multiple-one, or general-individual.

===== The Ionescians =====
The "Ionescians" grouped around their teacher and/or friend, Nae Ionescu (1890–1940). He earned his PhD in Germany, with a study on "logistic", i.e., in the terminology of the epoch, mathematical logic. He rejected mathematical logic, considering it reductive even in comparison to classical logic. After his death, some of his students and associates (Noica, Amzăr, Eliade, Onicescu, Vulcănescu) published his various lectures on Logic, History of Logic, Epistemology (i.e. Theory of Knowledge) and on Metaphysics and The History of Metaphysics. His approach to the History of Philosophy is mostly typological, not chronological. Nae Ionescu's thought could be described overall as an existential philosophy of Christian authenticity, called "Trăirism" (from the verb "a trăi", to live), an autochthonous version of Existentialism influenced by vitalism and Orthodox theology.

The most important of his adherents were Mircea Vulcănescu (1904–1952), Mircea Eliade (1907–1986), Emil Cioran (1911–1995), Constantin Noica (1909–1987). Others like Petre Țuțea were also influenced by his personality, and philosophers like Alexandru Dragomir and Mihai Șora attended some of his courses.

Mircea Vulcănescu analysed in his essay Dimensiunea românească a existenţei (The Romanian Dimension of Existence) the conceptual paradigm that serves as a means of evaluation of diverse philosophical visions by Romanians. By analyzing certain Romanian phrases, in what he calls a phenomenological manner, he claims to unravel the characteristics of Romanian existence: the feeling of a vast universal solidarity, a conviction that everything has a meaning and a purpose, a propension towards skepticism, volatility, and indetermination, and the belief in the duality "this world" vs "the other world". For example, from an analysis of the linguistic particularities of negation in the Romanian language, he deduces the Romanian ethos, with traits like fatalism or indifference regarding death, an easygoing attitude toward life, the conception that there is no alternative but also nothing irremediable.

Mircea Eliade, a scholar of the history of religions, published a few essays showing the influence of his teacher Ionescu.

Emil Cioran, in his early books written in Romanian, proposed a philosophy of despair. He wrote mostly on nihilist themes of Nietzschean and Schopeanhaurean provenance, with some contemporary influences like Giovanni Papini and Nicolai Berdiaev.

Constantin Noica wrote an essay called Mathesis sau bucuriile simple (Mathesis, or the Simple Joys), a short consideration on the fulfilment of loneliness and cultural endeavors. His PhD thesis was called Schiţă pentru istoria lui Cum e cu putinţă ceva nou(A Sketch for the History of How Something New May be Possible).

===== The Transylvanians =====
Transylvania thinkers active between the Wars included Lucian Blaga (1895–1961), D. D. Rosca (1895–1980), and Eugeniu Sperantia (1888–1972).

Lucian Blaga's philosophical system, called "ekstatic intellectualism", had roots in the philosophy of Kant, psychoanalysis, and Patristic philosophy. The system was projected in five "trilogies", but only three were achieved and a fourth was partially elaborated. The trilogies are, in order: The Trilogy of Knowledge, The Trilogy of Culture, The Trilogy of Values, and The Cosmological Trilogy.

The metaphysical vision of Blaga centres around a mysterious metaphysical source or principle he called "The Great Anonymous", which creates the Universe indirectly, by mutilating the forms of existence that emanate from him, in order to avoid the possibility of the apparition of another Great Anonymous. The results of these acts of mutilation are infinitesimal fragments, structured in types, and called "divine differentials". The extant beings appear by the aggregation of these differentials. The speculative cosmology of Blaga also includes an entelechial interpretation of evolutionist biology.

His theory of knowledge asserts the existence of an "unconscious spirit" endowed with his own set of categories which double the Kantian categories of the conscious spirit. These categories of the unconscious prevent humans from completely revealing the mystery of existence, since all his knowledge must fit into this categorical framework. Thus, the Great Anonymous maintains an isolated "centrality of existence", because a complete knowledge would make the man godlike, but also infuses human activity with a creative tension. Blaga's metaphysical axiology also follows this conception. All categories encompass human powers of expression, and their dynamic influence is finally projected into values. In other words, what we can not overcome, we idolise. This "finalist self-deluding" repetitively ensures the creative destiny of mankind.

All human culture is according to Blaga the result of man's trying to reveal the mysteries of existence, it constitutes the man's being. Since man can not reveal completely the mysteries, because of the "transcendent censure" exerted by the unconscious categorial scheme, all his productions bear the mark of this dynamic framework. The totality of these categories at some point is called a "stylistic matrix", and they have the structure of a "cosmoid", that is of a small universe, i.e. a self-sufficient order. Thus, each culture is characterised by a style, in which different categories activate and wear off successively, until the complete exhaustion of the stylistic matrix. At that moment, the culture generated by the attempts of revelation within the respective stylistic matrix dies. This vision is inspired by, but significantly detached from the morphological theory of culture, as exposed by a Frobenius or a Spengler.

D. D. Rosca, who would later be the coordinator and translator of the series of complete works of Hegel into Romanian, arrived at a philosophical synthesis presented in his book Existenţa tragică (The Tragic Existence). It is a variation of existentialism, with roots in Kierkegaard, but influenced also by Hegel. His PhD thesis at the Sorbonne was L’influence de Hegel sur Taine, théoricien de la connaissance et de l’art (The Influence of Hegel on Taine), and his secondary thesis was the translation to French of Hegel's Life of Jesus.

Eugeniu Sperantia's PhD thesis, The Pragmatic Apriorism, was a rethinking of Kant's Transcendental Analytic from a Pragmatist stand-point. He wrote subsequently on various subjects, like the biology from a Hegelian perspective. He was a pioneer in the field of erotetic logic (the logic of interrogatives), which he called "problematology". He also wrote System of Metaphysics: Implicit in the Postulates of Any Possible Knowledge. In this work Sperantia replaced the categorial theories of classical metaphysics with the analysis of the most general questions, analysis rendered possible by his problematology. Thus, the framework-theory of metaphysics becomes the logic of the interrogatives. Recently, his conception of metaphysics was compared to that of Collingwood.

===== Other philosophers =====
Philosophical authors unaffiliated to the previous three currents included Vasile Bancilă (1897–1979), Ionel Gherea, Anton Dumitriu (1905–1992) and Stéphane Lupasco (1900–1988).

Vasile Bancilă wrote two commentaries on Blaga and Radulescu-Motru, and gave a reply to Blaga's Mioritic Space, also called plai. Bancilă tried to show that Romanian culture as a whole does not reflect only a single "abysmal" category of space, the plai structure pointed out by Blaga, and he subsequently tried to show the existence of a "Bărăgan space"; a space not determined by the alternating relief of hills or mountains, but by the flat plain.

Ionel Gherea, son of the Marxist sociologist Constantin Dobrogeanu-Gherea, published a book called Le moi et le monde. Essai d’une cosmogonie anthropomorphique (The I and the World: Essay in Anthropomorphic Cosmogony) which contains a discussion of the concept of personal identity. He postulated the existence of an original state of human being, called "fictiv being", a form of impersonal conscience, from which the World is built.

Anton Dumitriu, initially a mathematician, obtained a PhD in philosophy then became the assistant of P. P. Negulescu. He was among the first philosophers in Romania interested in the philosophy of science, subject he treated in The Philosophical bases of Science. He introduces in Romania the latest mathematical logic, mostly by his works The New Logic and The Polyvalent Logic, where he presents the Russell–Whitehead axiomatic system of Principia Mathematica, and C.I. Lewis' system of strict implication. Also, he researched the problem of logical – semantic paradoxes, having the conviction that the solution to them was already available in the works of the Scholastic philosophers.

Stéphane Lupasco tried to lay the basis of a new epistemology, consonant with the then newly developed quantum mechanics. He advocated a logic of the included third, which conducted him to sustain the existence of third state, beyond matter and energy.

In the 1940s the mathematician Octav Onicescu conducted a seminar in philosophy of science at the University of Bucharest. Among the most important members of this group of scientific philosophy were fellow mathematicians Grigore Moisil and Dan Barbilian as well as other scientists like Șerban Țițeica or Nicholas Georgescu-Roegen. They were engaged in foundational research, using mathematics as a formal instrument of conceptual analysis. Their results were published in the anthology The Problem of Determinism, or in some monographs as Onicescu's Principles of Scientific Knowledge, Georgescu-Roegen's The Statistical Method or P. Sergescu's Mathematical Thinking.

==== Communist period ====
Under totalitarian rule, Romanian philosophers were persecuted. Lucretiu Patrascanu (1900–1954) was the author of a work, Currents and Tendencies in Romanian Philosophy, which appealed to the "Marxist-Leninist" doctrine to "expose" philosophers such as Blaga, Radulescu-Motru, Florian, Cioran as idealists, irrationalists, mystics, bourgeois, imperialists and sometimes fascists. Constantin I. Gulian (1914–2011), a member of the Romanian Academy since 1955 until his death, produced several expositions of Hegelian philosophy.

After 1964, the date of the amnesty of political prisoners, philosophical life had a chance to come back into existence, partly catalysed by the professional reinsertion of philosophers who had been either imprisoned or marginalized.

===== The Interbellum School =====
Philosophers formed in the interbellum period, that remained active after the loosening of restrictions included Mircea Florian, Constantin Noica, Anton Dumitriu, Mihai Șora (b. 1916), Petre Țuțea (1902–1991), Alexandru Dragomir (1916–2002).

Constantin Noica's first book published after detention was 27 Steps of the Real in which he unifies three categorial systems, those of Plato, Aristotle, and Kant. Under a Hegelian, but maybe also influenced by Nicolai Hartmann, he thought that reality, divided in three realms, inorganic, organic and spiritual, is characterised by three distinct sets of categories. At the peak of this categorial ladder he put a new category, which reflects the impact that physics had on his thought: the undulation, or the wave, which became thus the supreme category.

He later developed the theory initiated by Vulcănescu, and wrote several books including Creation and Beauty in Romanian Speech, or The Romanian Sentiment of Being. In these books Noica arrived at the conclusion that the Romanian language possesses a word, a preposition, which mediates its unique access to the realm of being. It is the preposition întru, which expresses the processuality of the being or what he calls "the becoming in-towards (întru) Being". This idiomatic preposition, of Latin provenance (intro) stands for more than a spatial inclusion: it indicates a going on, a movement both toward something, and within that something i.e. a movement of participation.

His metaphysics consists of The Becoming in-to the Being and Letters on the Logic of Hermes, but it was incipient since Six Maladies of the Contemporary Spirit. In these works Noica described how the monolithic unity of being is broken, and being displays three instances; The being of first instance is arrived at phenomenologically. As such, the being of things appears as a functional model, the structure Individual – Determinations – General (I-D-G), which the things are striving to realise. But the model of the being is rarely found realised like that; most currently it is incomplete, only two of the three terms being present. Thus, there are six incomplete, unsaturated formations, called by Noica "ontological precariousness" or "maladies of being" (or "of the spirit", in Six maladies...). These maladies, schematically represented as I-G, G-I, I-D, D-I, D-G, and G-D, are what he calls the rule of the real. Then, the being of second instance is the "element", characterised as an individual-general, which is an entity that is not a particular, i.e. its conditions of identity do not make reference to a single spatio-temporal location. Something is an individual-general if it distributes itself without dividing. Like the Whiteheadian ingression, the "distribution without dividing" is a rethinking of the Platonic participation. A favourite exemplification of the nature of an element is for Noica the concept of biological species. The elements are characterised by different categories than the things, of a speculative nature, like unity-multiplicity-totality, reality-possibility-necessity. The being of the third instance, or the being qua being, is theorised in several pages of an incredible density, and in a language close to theology. Noica attempts to rethink here the problem of the one and the many, in a Parmenidean – Platonic style. He formulates as a criterion for being the same "distribution without dividing".

Noica revised Hegelian dialectics, accused explicitly by Noica of being dominated by the "ethos of neutrality". In Hegelian logic, Noica contends, Hegel himself must intervene in order to give the concepts the necessary impetus for their movement. They do not have in themselves the power to move dialectically. Noica considers that dialectics is circular and tetradic. The scheme thesis – antithesis – synthesis is replaced by him with the rival scheme theme – anti-theme – thesis – theme (refound). The spirit, Noica says, begins not with a thesis, but with a thematic horizon in which it moves, and into which it digs repeatedly, going more and more toward the intimacy of this horizon. Several of Noica's peculiar paradoxical concepts, which allow him to articulate his views on dialectics, are difficult to comprehend, and require much sympathy from the reader: "the non-limiting limitation", "the opening closure" etc.

Noica's philosophy was also concerned with the problem of reason and the problem of the individual. He redefined reason as "the conscience of the becoming in-to being". The philosopher wanted to save the individual from "the tyranny of the general", to give to the individual an "ontological dignity". He was deeply disturbed by the image of the individual as a simple instance of something general, as a simple particular case of a general rule. But he also intended to maintain the reality of the general natures, not wanting to reduce them to mere collections or classes of individuals. Thus, he rejected both Platonic realism, and nominalism of all kinds. Instead of choosing between nominalism and realism, he proposed a third version, which insists on the solidarity existent between the individual and the general, linked by their determinations. His triangle I-D-G forms thus an irreducible unity, reminiscent of Peirce's triad.

Constantin Noica formed around him an unofficial school of philosophy, based at Păltiniș, a mountain location where he spent his last living years. Păltiniș became a place of pilgrimage for young Romanian intellectuals, who went there in search of a spiritual mentor. He imposed to his disciples the intensive study of Greek and German, and he asked them to approach "cultures", not authors and certainly not isolated books. He initiated in collaboration with Petru Creția the integral edition of Plato in Romanian. He also translated from neo-Platonic Aristotelian commentators, Dexippus, Ammonius, Porphyry and others. He contributed to the translation of Kant's Critique of Judgement, and he translated from Chorydaleus, the Introduction to logic and the Commentary to Metaphysics. He also wrote commentaries and interpretations of Plato, Aristotle, and Hegel, and encouraged the introduction of Heidegger's writings.

Anton Dumitriu wrote a series of essays centered on literature, including Philosophia Mirabilis, an essay on the esoteric dimension of the Greek philosophy, Eleatic Cultures and Heracleitean Cultures, a comparative essay in the philosophy of culture, and Aletheia, a study of the Greek meaning of truth and of philosophy, where he criticises Heidegger's position in Introduction to Metaphysics.

Mihai Șora was a student of Nae Ionescu and Mircea Eliade, but younger than the members of the '27 generation. He obtained in 1938 a bourse at the Sorbonne, where he went for preparing a thesis on Pascal. During wartime he wrote a book called On the Interior Dialogue, published only in 1947 at Gallimard, and well received by Jacques Maritain and Étienne Gilson. In this work Șora explores the problem of human authenticity, in an existential tone, but influenced greatly by Scholastic philosophy (including that of Thomas Aquinas and Nicolaus Cusanus) and by Marxism (he was a member of the French communist party and a member of the Résistance).

In 1948 he returned to Romania, and was unable to leave the country afterwards. He did not publish anything until the end of the 70s, when he began a cycle of four books, containing a philosophical system, achieved only in 2005. During the communist regime he wrote and published three of the four books composing the cycle: The Salt of the Earth, To be, the do, to have and I & You & He & She or the Generalised Dialogue. His last book is called The Instant and the Time. His system consists of an ontology, a poetics, an ethics and a political philosophy, all deriving from an original "ontological model". The influences comes from Péguy, Pascal, the Scholastics and from Husserl.

His concept of intentionality was neither that of Brentano, nor that of Husserl, but an original one with roots in the Scholastic philosophy. In-tentio, derived from IN aliud TENDERE is the penetrating act of the spirit, which goes beyond the things into their origin, which is the Unum with his three transcendentals: Bonum, Verum and Pulchrum. Thus, there are three forms of intentionality, moral, theoretical and esthetical, characterising three types of human attitudes toward the world. The Unum is not viewed only as an actus purus, but rather as a "universal potentiality of being". As such, i.e. is placed, in Șora's metaphorical model, at the centre of a sphere of null radius, which has, thus, the same topos as the periphery. The surface of this sphere represents the pure exteriority, composed of "terminal actualities". The radius is the geometrical locus of the interiority, where we find the "intermediary potentialities".

Petre Țuțea had a PhD in Administrative Law. Before and during the Second World War he worked as a director in the Ministry of National Economy. Initially having Marxist convictions, he developed right-wing nationalist sympathies, that eventually led lead to his arrest and conviction. In prison he rediscovered Christianity, and after his release he considered himself a Christian philosopher. Although Țuțea could not publish very much, he wrote a late work projected in five volumes, "Problems, Systems, Styles, Sciences" and finally "Dogmas". He completed the first two, and a small part of "Styles" and "Dogmas" – of which the first two volumes were published posthumously. Țuțea was influenced by Plato, Greek Skepticism, Leibniz, Nietzsche, Bergson, Simmel and the fictionalism of Hans Vaihinger. The only significant Romanian philosophical influences were Lucian Blaga and Nae Ionescu. Theologically, he was influenced by St. Paul, Augustine and later Thomas Aquinas, while he also knew and admired the major contemporary Romanian theologian, Fr. Dumitru Stăniloae, whom he met in prison. Țuțea also appreciated various thinkers like Werner Sombart, and frequently refers to scientists like Heisenberg and Poincaré.

Initially Țuțea rejected the categories of Western idealism, replacing the Kantian conceptual framework with a spectrum of empirical-phenomenological nuances. His later philosophy, as he declared, was an effort of "theologal" (not theological) thinking. He argued that Truth is unique, but human reason cannot find it by itself, although it can be a receptacle of truth. Thus, in order to really know the truth, man needs inspiration and revelation. Man is never autonomous, and all intellectual efforts like science or philosophy are only means of producing fictions, at the level of material and cultural comfort. Țuțea believed that science and philosophy by themselves don't even have a consoling function, being essentially irrelevant with respect to the most dramatic issues, like death. Thus, only religion (specifically, Christianity) possesses the truth and bears relevance to the destiny of humankind. Without it, he says, man is just "a rational animal that comes from nowhere and doesn't go anywhere". Anthropologically, Țuțea analyzed what he calls "Christian man"; the anthropological model to be pursued is that of the saint.

After his release from prison Țuțea elaborated at least three original literary-philosophical styles: The Philosophy of Nuances, Theatre as Seminar and Religious-theologal Reflections.

Several of his close friends and companions such as Mircea Eliade, Emil Cioran, Petre Pandrea, later Marcel Petrișor, Aurel-Dragoș Munteanu and from the younger generation Radu Preda and Alexandru Popescu.

Alexandru Dragomir, a former doctoral student of Heidegger, was a reticent man who wrote secretly and never intended to publish anything. In his old days he began giving private seminaries, which he carried on until his death; only a very narrow group of intellectuals attended. After he died several notebooks were found, whose publication is not finished, including several with reflections on time, which form the most consistent part of his thought. Studia Phaenomenologica dedicated one of its issues to him.

===== The School of Paltinis =====
Constantin Noica discovered and trained younger philosophers such as Gabriel Liiceanu (b. 1942), Andrei Pleșu (b. 1948), Sorin Vieru (b. 1933), Andrei Cornea (b. 1952), Vasile Dem. Zamfirescu, Alexandru Surdu (b. 1938) and Corneliu Mircea.

Gabriel Liiceanu published The Păltiniș Diary, where he described his paideic adventure under Noica's guidance. Liiceanu's philosophical project initially centered around the idea of "limit", and he therefore called his hermeneutic inquiry into the nature and history of this concept "peratology" (from the Greek peras = limit). This program initiated with The Tragic. A Phenomenology of Limit and Overcoming, his PhD thesis, where he lays much accent on Nietzsche, and accomplished with On Limit, the final and more general expression of his peratology. On Limit touches on various topics such as of liberty, destiny, responsibility, encounter with the other, in a framework basically Heideggerian. Liiceanu also accomplished the translation of Heidegger into Romanian.

Andrei Pleșu was first known as an art historian. He avowed being more interested in the "light" side of philosophy, as he had a "respectful antipathy" towards Aristotle, and considered that he had absolutely no use for Hegel. He oriented himself toward ethics and the philosophy of religion. His focal idea is that of the "interval", the in-between of existence, as a space of itinerancy. Plesu wrote one of the very few Romanian treatises of ethics, Minima Moralia, which is subtitled "an ethics of the interval". It begins by affirming that only the man in the condition of itinerancy has moral competence, needing to make choices at every step of the way. Thus, true ethics is not a major one of the great problems and puzzles, but a minor ethics of the quotidian life and of ordinary situations. Further on, he explored the theme of the interval in his On Angels, a book of angelology, arising at the intersection between metaphysics and the philosophy of religion. In this book, the entities called angels are analysed as a cases of "beings of the interval". The entire exercise has thus the secondary value of ontology of the interval.

Andrei Cornea is a specialist in the ancient Greek philosophy and also a political thinker. During the communist regime he published little in the domain of philosophy, but he translated Plato's Republic. After 1989 he published intensively. including Plato. Philosophy and Censorship, When Socrates is not Right, and From the School of Athens to the School of Paltinis. He also published a critique of contemporary relativism in The Khazar Tournament. He translated Aristotle's Metaphysics and a great part of Plotinus's Enneads.

Vasile Dem. Zamfirescu's main interests were in psychoanalysis. He wrote a book on The Logic of the Heart and the Logic of the Mind, and after 1989 he published his Philosophy of the Unconscious (2 volumes), exploring the philosophical potential of the psychoanalytical idea of unconscious.

Alexandru Surdu specialised initially in logic, publishing books on Intuitionism and Intuitionist logic. He also studied the Aristotelian logic, thus arriving to his The Theory of Pre-judicative Forms, a rethinking of the categories with the means of formal logic. After 1989 he published on the Romanian philosophy and speculative philosophy. Notable volumes are The Pentamorphosis of the Art and The Speculative Philosophy. Alexandru Surdu is, like Noica, an anti-Hegelian Hegelian. Thus, he criticises Hegel for his "absolutisation" of triadic dialectics, he criticises also Noica for absolutising the tetradic dialectics, while proposing his version of a pentadic dialectics. He maintains, though, that diverse experiential realms are to be investigated by diverse dialectics, binary, triadic, tetradic or pentadic. The categories of the systematic philosophy, as determined by Surdu, are five: Transcendence/Subsistence, Being, Existence, Real Existence, and Reality. Surdu was one of the translators of Wittgenstein's Tractatus into Romanian and he translated also from Kant.

Corneliu Mircea is a psychiatrist and also a philosopher. During communism he gave, among other publications, The Book of Being, Being and Consciousness, Discourse on Being, and after 1989 he published (among other things) The Originary, Being and Ek-stasis, The Making. A Treatise on Being. Influenced by Hegel and by Sartre, his philosophy is an inquiry into the meaning of being, commencing with nothingness, in an attempt of rethinking both Hegel's Logic and Sartre's Being and Nothingness.

===== The Epistemological School of Bucharest =====
Following the examples of Anton Dumitriu, Grigore Moisil or Octav Onicescu, several teachers at the University of Bucharest oriented themselves toward epistemology and the philosophy of science, which due to its technical nature lacked ideological control and interference. After the demise of the communism, they continued their preoccupations, but also wrote on many other subjects. Members of this school included Mircea Flonta (b. 1932), Ilie Parvu (b. 1941), Vasile Tonoiu (1941-2023), and Marin Turlea (b. 1940).

Mircea Flonta wrote a monograph on the theme of the analytic/synthetic distinction in contemporary philosophy, and a study on the Philosophical Presuppositions of the Exact Sciences. His activity continued after 1989 and diversified, as he approached such themes as the perception of philosophy in the Romanian culture. Among his perennial interests are the philosophy of Kant (he translated from Kant and wrote a book on him) and that of Wittgenstein (likewise, he translated several of his books and published a book on his philosophy).

Ilie Parvu is an epistemologist, philosopher of science, metaphysician and interpreter of Kant. His studies in the philosophy of science (The Scientific Theory, The Semantics and the Logic of Science) emphasized the contemporary formal instruments of analysis of the scientific theories. Parvu can be considered as belonging to the structuralist current in the philosophy of science, following J. Sneed, W. Stegmüller, C. U. Moulines, W. Balzer etc.

The structuralist analysis of theories was applied by Ilie Parvu in the domain of the reconstruction of some crucial philosophical works, like the Tractatus of Wittgenstein or the Critique of Pure Reason.

As a metaphysician, Parvu published the two-volume The Architecture of Existence. In the first volume he analyses the structural-generative paradigm in ontology. He conceives of an ontological theory as having an abstract-structural core, which generates its applications not by direct instantiation, but by restrictions and specialisations of this core, which evolves at the same time with the application. Professor Parvu analysed also the theories capable of furnishing decisive mediations between the structural abstraction of the nucleus and the world of empirical evidence. In the second volume he analysed the contemporary analytic metaphysics, the ontological contemporary constructive programs, as that of Carnap or Quine, as well as local metaphysics, like that of dispositions, powers, the ontologies of events, and different theories of the individual. He presented also discussions concerning the metaontology, constructional apparatus, style and techniques in recent metaphysics.

Vasile Tonoiu was interested mostly in the continental philosophy of science, translating Poincaré, Gonseth, Bachelard, and writing monographs on Gonseth and Bachelard. He also published a book on Morin's epistemological vision of complexity. Another chief interest of Tonoiu's is the dialogic philosophy, or the philosophy of dialogue. He wrote also an book on Mircea Eliade, Archaic Ontologies in Actuality.

Marin Turlea dedicated his career to the philosophy of mathematics. His work on The Philosophy and the Foundations of Mathematics traces a distinction between the foundational and the foundationist research in mathematics, i.e. between mathematicians' own research on its foundations, and the philosophical research of the foundations of the mathematics. In this book he establishes the possibilities, sphere of action and relevance of the philosophical study of mathematics. Following the lines of the program indicated in this first work, Turlea will elaborate a Philosophy of Mathematics, more like a history of the philosophical problems connected with systems of mathematics, from Plato and Proclus to Principia Mathematica. He analyzes the metaphysics of mathematical entities in his Existence and Truth in Mathematics, and he studies Wittgenstein's philosophy (or rather anti-philosophy) of mathematics.

===== Marxism =====
Athanase Joja (1904–1972), was a logician and interpreter of the ancient philosophy, with contributions to Marxist "dialectical logic". He founded the Romanian Academy's Institute of Logic, where many interbellic philosophers, including Noica, were reinserted professionally.

Another Marxist figure was Henri Wald (1920–2002), whose thinking was a mixture of French Structuralism and Marxism, and who wrote also an Introduction to the Dialectical Logic.

Ion Ianoși (b. 1928) is a Marxist philosopher from a different class, closer to literature, was for many years the secretary of the literary critique section of the Union of the Writers from Romania. He published a trilogy on the aesthetical category of the sublime, a volume on Hegel and the Art and others, including a study of the Romanian philosophy in its relation with literature, Philosophy and Literature.

==== Democratic period ====
After the Revolution of 1989, philosophy in Romania began to synchronize with Western contemporary philosophy. Works banned by the Communist regime began to be published.

Phenomenology is represented by two groups, one from Cluj, including Virgil Ciomoș and Ion Copoeru, and the other from Bucharest, developed as a consequence of Liiceanu's influence. This later group includes the editors of Studia Phaenomenologica, Cristian Ciocan and Gabriel Cercel, and the Heideggerians like Catalin Cioaba or Bogdan Minca. Virgil Ciomoș published phenomenological interpretations of Aristotle and Kant, while Copoeru is a Husserlian scholar.

Exponents of Post-modernism in Romanian philosophy include Ciprian Mihali and Bogdan Ghiu. Although Mihali is more interested in the phenomenological analysis of the quotidian, his thinking is deeply rooted in French post-Structuralism. Ghiu, through his translations on Deleuze and various essays spread the influence of postmodern and poststructuralist French philosophy in Romania.

Analytic philosophy developed mostly at the University of Bucharest, by people including Mircea Dumitru, Adrian-Paul Iliescu, Adrian Miroiu, Valentin Mureșan, Mihail-Radu Solcan. Mircea Dumitru wrote on philosophical logic, the philosophy of language and the philosophy of mind. Iliescu is a political philosopher (liberalism and conservatism), but also has interests in the philosophy of language, publishing a book on Wittgenstein. Adrian Miroiu published works in the fields of modal logic, philosophy of science and political philosophy. More recently, after joining the National School of Political Science and Public Administration, he has moved to fields related to political science, such as social choice theory, rational choice theory, electoral competition, public policies and educational policies. Valentin Muresan works in the field of ethics. He published commentaries of Plato, Aristotle, and Mill. Professor Solcan contributed to the development of the philosophy of mind in Romania, publishing an introduction to the philosophy of mind form the perspective of the cognitive sciences.

Horia-Roman Patapievici was intellectually affiliated to the interbellic tradition, close to the members of the Păltiniș school, and also attended some of Dragomir's seminars. He published The Recent Man, or What is lost when Something is won. In this essay of cultural and political philosophy Patapievici developed a conservative critique of late modernity.

Professor Ștefan Aloroaei from the University of Iași is a specialist in hermeneutics. He published The Negative Reason. Historico-symbolic Scenarios, How is Philosophy in Eastern Europe Possible?, and Our Metaphysics of All Days, where he tries to hermeneutically investigate the metaphysica naturalis implicit in the ordinary intercourse of the commonsense with the world.

== Bibliography ==
- Bagdasar, Nicolae – Istoria filosofiei românești, București: Societatea Română de Filosofie, 1940
- Ianoși, Ion – O istorie a filosofiei românești în raport cu literatura, Cluj: Apostrof, 1997
- Marta Petreu, Mircea Flonta, Ioan Lucian Muntean, "Romania, philosophy in", Routledge Encyclopedia of Philosophy, 2004
- Parvu, Ilie – " Traditii ale filosofiei analitice din Romania ", in Revista de Filosofie Analitică Volumul I, 1o, Iulie-Decembrie 2007, pp. 1–17
