= Ioan Zalomit =

Romanian philosopher

Ioan Zalomit (1823–1885) was a Romanian philosopher, professor and rector of the University of Bucharest.

== Biography ==
Ioan Zalomit was born in Bucharest, in a family of merchants. His parents were probably of Greek origin, but they were born in Wallachia.

He began his education in private schools, probably French, and achieved his formation in France, at the University of Paris and later in Germany, at the University of Berlin. He obtained the title of doctor of philosophy at this later university, in 1848, with a dissertation on Kant's philosophy.He studied under Friedrich Wilhelm Joseph Schelling and followed his philosophical ideas.

In 1850, Zalomit began teaching philosophy at the Saint Sava Academy. When the University of Bucharest was established, in 1864, he was appointed Professor of philosophy at the Faculty of Letters. He held the office of rector of the university between May 1871 - April 1885. In 1882 he became a member of the Permanent Council of Public Instruction, and in 1885 he was elected vice-president of this institution.

D. A. Laurian and Constantin Leonardescu studied under him in Bucharest.

== Philosophical contributions ==
Like other translators, Zalomit contributed to the creation of a modern Romanian philosophical terminology and to the diffusion of philosophical ideas in the Romanian society. The textbook of Antoine Charma (1801–1869) that he translated introduced in Romania the eclecticism of Victor Cousin, whose disciple Charma was. This work proposed the following disciplinary division of the philosophy: psychology, logic, morals, theodicy and history of philosophy. By means of the translation of Charma's handbook, Zalomit introduces for the first time in Romania the history of philosophy as a philosophical discipline.

His dissertation from 1848 is the first exegesis of Kant's philosophy written by a Romanian. Although the Kantianism was at that time known to Romanians from different courses and textbooks (of Daniil Philippidis, Gheorghe Lazăr, Eufrosin Poteca, Eftimie Murgu, August Treboniu Laurian, Simeon Bărnuţiu, and of course that of Zalomit himself), there were still no monographs on this subject. Zalomit places Kant in the historical context of the modern philosophy, presenting the main figures of the empiricist and rationalist traditions. He considers that Kant is a spiritual successor of Descartes, and that he accomplished the program set forth, but unrealised, by Descartes.

Ioan Zalomit offers in his dissertation a criticism of Kant, on several topics. For example, he criticises the epistemological preeminence that Kant assigns to the visual sense, arguing that touching has to be at least as important as seeing for the knowledge of the exterior world, since the category of substance is practically inseparable from this sense. He argues next that Kant did not critically analysed the three ideas of the pure reason, which, in his opinion, are nothing but distinct applications of the idea of infinite, or of Absolute, and can therefore be reduced to this idea. Next, he makes the point that, speaking of things-in-themselves, Kant crosses the limits of his own philosophy.

Zalomit considers that the greatest difficulty of Kant's philosophy is the distinction between nature and liberty. He thinks that this separation can not be maintained, and he argues that an identification of nature and liberty is not to be feared. The moral laws can not be harmed by this, because liberty is natural, it is inherent to the notion of nature. Thus, the moral precepts could be regarded as duties of the nature. By this naturalisation of the liberty Zalomit wanted to save the "true harmony of the natural things", the "true organism of the Universe", in order to save both human liberty and the validity of the concept of Divine Providence. This Christian and organicist conception testifies of the influence that the Eastern Orthodoxy had on his world-view, but also of his knowledge of Schelling's philosophy of nature.

== Bibliography ==
=== Original works ===
- De Kantianae philosophiae principiis ac dignitate. Dissertatio inauguralis philosophica, Berolini, [1848]
- Principes et mérite de la philosophie de Kant, inaugural dissertation, Berlin, Gustav Schade, 1848 (the French version of the previous title)
- The State of the Public Instruction in Upper Romania at the End of the Academic Year 1861-1862. Discourse Pronounced with the Occasion of the Prize-Awarding Ceremony on June 29, 1862, Bucharest, Typographia Statului Sf. Sawa şi Niphon, 1862

=== Translations ===
- Elements of Philosophy, Bucharest, Tipografia lui Eliade, 1854, translation of A. Charma's Réponses aux questions de philosophie contenues dans le programme adopté pour l'examen du baccalauréat ès Lettres, Paris, Librarie Classique et Elémentaire de L. Hachette, 1835.
