= Geographia Neoteriki =

Book by Grigorios Konstantas

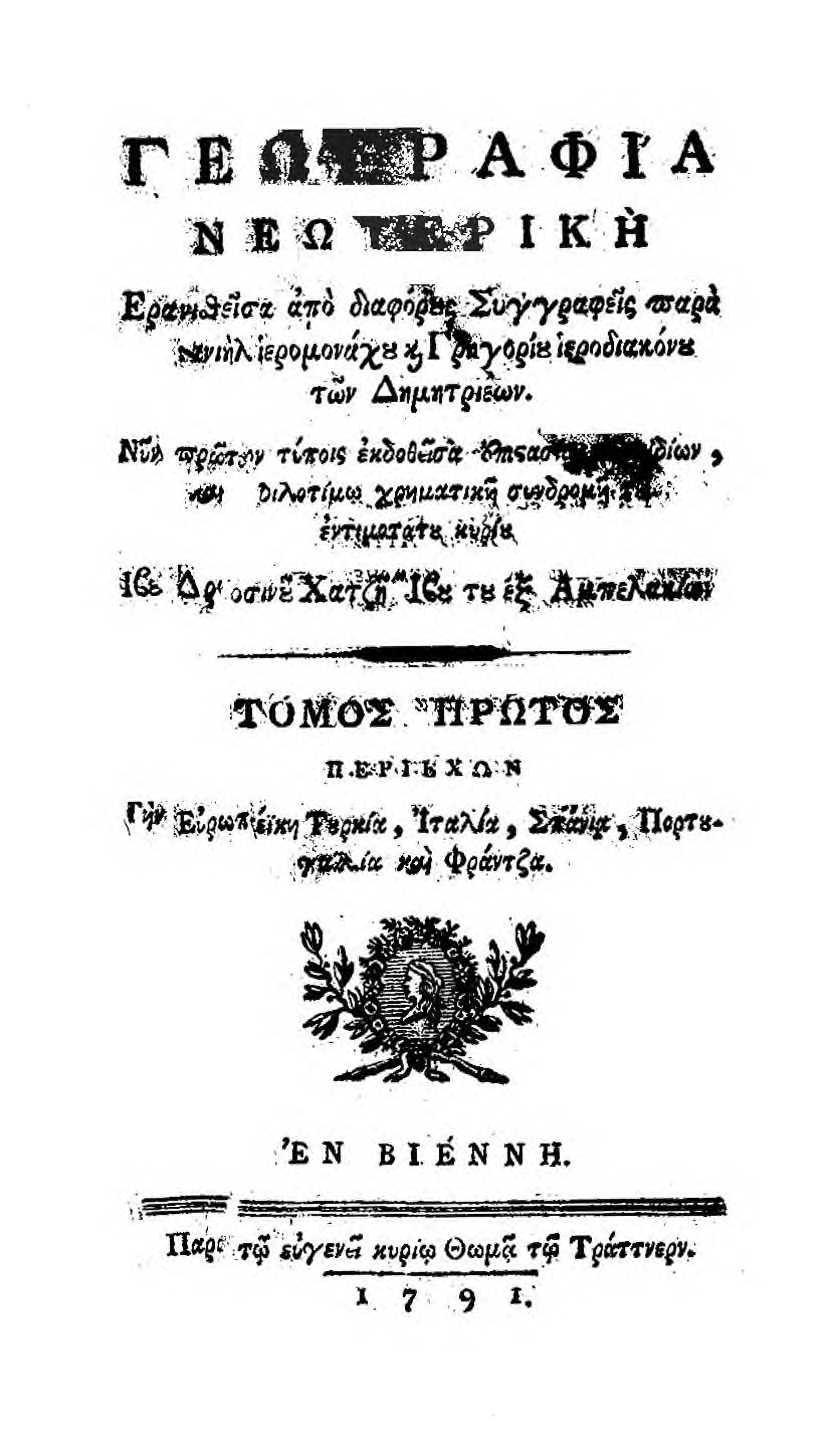
- Cover
- Author: Grigorios Konstantas; Daniel Philippidis
- Original title: Γεωγραφία Νεωτερική
- Language: Greek
- Genre: Geography, Ethnography, Sociology
- Publication date: 1791

Geographia Neoteriki (Greek: Γεωγραφία Νεωτερική Modern Geography) is a geography book written in Greek by Daniel Philippidis and Grigorios Konstantas and printed in Vienna in 1791. It focused on both the physical and human geography features of the European continent and especially on Southeastern Europe, and is considered one of the most remarkable works of the modern Greek Enlightenment. The authors of the Geographia Neoteriki adopted new geographical methodologies for that time, which were primarily based on personal examination of the described areas and used as sources a number of contemporary European handbooks.

The work, written in a vernacular language, also described the contemporary social developments and expressed ideas that were considered revolutionary and anticlerical, and addressed the political and economic decay of the Ottoman Empire. Geographia Neoteriki was welcomed with enthusiasm by western intellectual circles, especially in France, but on the other hand, it was largely neglected by Greek scholars.

== Background ==
A category of historical and geographical literature, focused on regional history and geography, emerged during the 18th century among Greek scholars. This kind of literature combined the collection of ethnographic data with a conviction in geography's moral and religious purpose. Major representatives of this field were two scholars and clerics, Daniel Philippidis and Grigorios Konstantas. They came from the village of Milies in Thessaly, modern Greece, and were nicknamed Dimitrieis, from the ancient name of their birthplace (Dimitrias). Both scholars were active members of the Greek diaspora in the Danubian Principalities, in modern Romania, where they studied and taught at the courts of the Greek Orthodox Phanariot and the Princely Academies of Bucharest and Iaşi. This environment offered in general a special attraction for ambitious and educated Greek people from the Ottoman Empire, contributing to the enlightenment of their nation. Philippidis' and Konstantas' work Geographia Neoteriki, published in Vienna in 1791, belongs to a body of contemporary texts which strove to map out the European parts of the Ottoman Empire and Greece in particular.

== Content ==
This work was the first and only volume by Daniel Philippidis and Grigorios Konstantas, and their intention was not only to define and describe the lands that were populated by Greeks, but also to describe the current social developments in the wider region. With this work they gave a precise delimitation of European Hellas (Greece) of that time, a few decades before the outbreak of the Greek War of Independence (1821). According to their description this area would not only include present-day Greece, but also Albania, North Macedonia and the southern half of Bulgaria, an area that included all the areas ruled by the Macedonian Kings, in addition to those of classical Greece incorporating most of the Orthodox populations of the Balkan peninsula, which was during that time under Ottoman rule.

They concluded that the 'Greek lands' are located in a privileged geographic location at the crossroads of three continents: Europe, Asia and Africa, however, as the Ottoman administration was incapable of reinforcing the rule of law, economic activity couldn't flourish. Thus, they addressed the political and economic instability of the Ottoman Empire that struggled to maintain control over different ethnicities and huge territories. As a consequence of that lack of control, many Greeks were impelled to seek protection outside the Ottoman Empire, while the ones that had not abandoned their lands, suffered under a terrible Ottoman regime, and had no educational rights.

Reflecting a new revolutionary era in the European history after the outbreak of the French Revolution, the authors expressed sharp social criticism, castigating the corruption of the church authorities, the idleness of the monasticism, and popular superstition. They also appealed for reform of the language, education, and change to the social mores as a way to overcome backwardness and to renew people's mentality with a more western view. They claimed that Greece is positioned within a Europe defined by the dynamics of political reforms from old and corrupt monarchical regimes to new republican communities. The modern innovative spirit of Geographia Neoteriki was also expressed in the use of a lively and malleable vernacular (Demotic) language with very few ties to the katharevousa, a more archaich form of Greek, which was commonly used by most Greek scholars of that time.

The book introduced a number of new ideas in the field of human geography and social organization models, that had been developed in the western world during the 18th century. Among the sources that the authors used to compose Geographia Neoteriki, were the Géographie Moderne by Nicolle de La Croix, the Géographie Ancienne, and the Géographie Moderne, which were part of the Encyclopédie Méthodique by Charles-Joseph Panckoucke. Additionally, the authors had personally examined the areas described in the work. This element served both as the work's primary organizing mode as well as the basis for their historical approach.

== Popularity ==
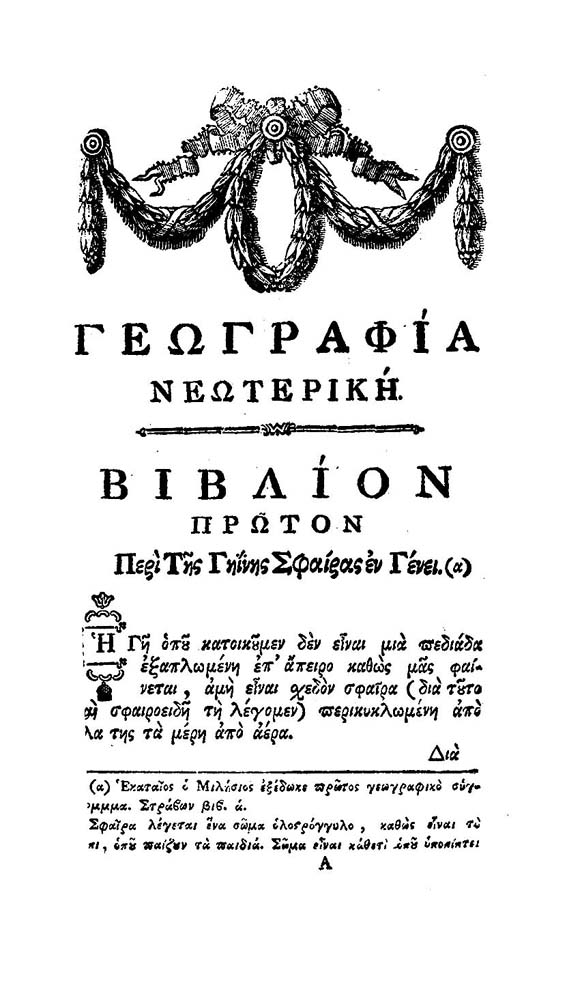
Chapter 1: Earth

In general, Geographia Neoteriki, was welcomed with enthusiasm by western intellectual circles. Jean-Baptiste-Gaspard d'Ansse de Villoison, professor of modern Greek in the Ecole des Langues Orientales Vivantes, used it as a textbook for his students. French geographer Barbie du Bocage published a review after the book's publication along with a translated passage. Moreover, travellers who published accounts during the early 19th century, frequently cited the text. François Pouqueville, William Martin Leake, Henry Holland, and Lord Byron mentioned this work, and used it as a source of information. The book also enjoyed some popularity in the non Greek regions of the Balkan peninsula, while 19th century Bulgarian authors of geographic textbooks used it as a model.

On the other hand, especially due to the vernacular language used, this work was largely neglected among the Greek scholars, especially by Adamantios Korais and Dimitrios Katartzis, and was never used as an academic work, or even as a school textbook. It was also negatively received by the Church hierarchy, as well as conservative Greek scholars, due to the vernacular language it used and the liberal views it expressed. The work's linguistic form disappointed even Dimitrios Katartzis, the intellectual mentor of the two authors, while Philippidis himself, never used such vernacular style language again in his future works. However, Geographia Neoteriki inspired a number of similar geographical works published in Greece during the 19th century.

== Book ==
The Digitized Book
Date	Title	Title in English
1791	Γεωγραφία Νεωτερική	Geographia Neoteriki (Modern Geography)

== Sources ==
- Kopeček, Michal (2006). Discourses of collective identity in Central and Southeast Europe (1770–1945): texts and commentaries. Central European University Press. pp. 73–79. ISBN 978-963-7326-52-3.
