= Iosipos Moisiodax =

Greek philosopher and social critic

- Born: 1725; Cernavodă, Wallachia
- Died: 1800 (aged 74–75); Bucharest, Wallachia

Academic background
- Education: University of Padua

Academic work
- Era: Enlightenment philosophy
- School or tradition: Western philosophy, Empiricism, Modern Greek Enlightenment, Romanian Philosophy
- Institutions: Princely Academy of Iaşi

Iosipos Moisiodax or Moesiodax (/ˈmiːsiədæks/; Greek: Ιώσηπος Μοισιόδαξ; 1725–1800) was a Greek and later Wallachian philosopher, an Eastern Orthodox deacon, and one of the greatest exponents of the modern Greek Enlightenment. He was also director of the Princely Academy of Iași and professor at the Princely Academy of Bucharest.

== Biography ==
Ioannis Moisiodax was born in the town of Cernavodă in Western Dobruja, at the time part of the Ottoman Empire. He later took the monastic name Iosipos. Some authors consider that his surname, Moisodax/Moesiodax ("Dacian from Moesia"), indicate Romanian or Aromanian origins. However, there is no doubt that Moisiodax saw himself as Greek and he presented himself as such. He may have been of Karamanli origin. Little is known about his youth, but it is assumed he received elementary education and learned Greek from a clergyman in Wallachia or Thrace.

In 1753–54, Moisiodax went to the Greek schools in Salonica and Smyrna, where he was influenced by Neo-Aristotelianism. In 1754–1755 he went for several years to the Athonite Academy, which was back then under the direction of Eugenios Voulgaris, another prominent exponent of the Neohellenic Enlightenment. Between 1759 and 1762 Moisiodax studied at the University of Padua, under Giovanni Poleni. During this period he was ordained an Eastern Orthodox deacon.

In 1765, during the reign of Grigore III Ghica, Moisiodax came to Moldavia where he became the Director of the Princely Academy of Iaşi, and its professor of philosophy. His philosophy teachings, influenced by John Locke, brought him into conflict with the exponents of traditional order, leading to his resignation in 1766. In 1766, becoming sick, possibly of tuberculosis, he retired from this professorship and went to Wallachia, where he passed the next 10 years. Having recovered from his illness, he returns to Iaşi, where he accepted for the second time the direction of the Academy. After only several months, he was forced to resign again, due to the boyars 'opposition to his way of teaching. He went first to Braşov (1777), and after that to Wien, where he published his most important work, The Apology. In 1797 he was briefly a professor at the Princely Academy of Bucharest. He died in Bucharest, in 1800.

The Apology (1780) is remarkable in many respects. Among other things, it is the first essay of Neohellenic literature. But its greatest importance resides in the concept of "sound philosophy" proposed there. This philosophy is the Occidental natural philosophy, as opposed to the Corydalean Neo-Aristotelianism that was taught everywhere in the Greek-speaking world. Moisiodax admired Descartes, Galilei, Christian Wolff, John Locke, but most of all he admired Isaac Newton. He thought that philosophical instruction must begin with the study of mathematics (Angelo Nicolaides), and that good philosophy is mathematical philosophy. Also, Moisiodax banned the Aristotelian logic from the academic curricula, replacing it with the theory of knowledge, and proposed that the Ancient Greek be replaced in classrooms by Modern Greek, in order to increase the clarity of the lessons taught.

== Philosophical work ==
=== Conflict between the Ancients and the Moderns ===
Iosipos Moisiodax was a critic of Greek society and culture during the Modern Greek Enlightenment. His philosophies on Greek society and culture focused on education reform as framed by his engagement in the conflict between the Ancients and the Moderns. Moisiodax argued for the Moderns in this debate. He believed that Greek society, in relation to Europe, overemphasized the importance of maintaining ancient philosophical theories over the incorporation of modern philosophical theories created during the Enlightenment. According to Moisiodax, this precluded Greek society from advancing socially or culturally, thus putting Greece at a disadvantage to many parts of Europe. Additionally, some Greeks at this time believed that ancient philosophers, such as Aristotle, created infallible philosophical theories which they felt compelled to follow instead of modern philosophical theories. This served as an obstacle to Moisiodax's argument for the incorporation of modern philosophical theories into Greek social and cultural life. In his attempt to change this notion, Moisiodax, as influenced by John Locke's theory on human perception, argued that people must employ reason to evaluate the theories of ancient philosophers to become free thinkers. Moisiodax rejected the notion of the infallibility of ancient theories while acknowledging their importance as the foundation for modern philosophy. In his work entitled, The Apology, Moisiodax described the creation of his "sound philosophy," one where intellectuals use math, science and reason to explain how human knowledge is derived from a human's experience of the natural world. In this way, "sounds philosophy" was part of Moisiodax's larger critique of Aristotle's theories on prime matter, and Greek society's adherence to an Aristotelian view of education. Moisiodax's "sound philosophy" appears in his other works as well. In his work entitled, Theory of Geography, Moisiodax used his "sound philosophy" to challenge the Ancients' theories of the basic functions of the Earth.

=== Education reform ===
To implement progressive social and cultural changes, Moisiodax argued that Greece needed to reform their education system to resemble the one adopted by Europe after their Enlightenment. As described in his work entitled, Pedagogy, Moisiodax sought to develop an education system that spread Enlightenment thinking and fostered free thought across Greece. Moisiodax mirrored his reforms after John Locke's theories on education, specifically those found in Locke's work entitled Some Thoughts Concerning Education. His theories also mirrored the section on education in Diderot's Encyclopedia.

Mirroring Locke's belief of the importance of developing virtue in children, Moisiodax focused on children in his critiques of the Greek education system. Moisiodax believed that, early on in their lives, children needed to be taught self-respect and respect for their elders. Moisiodax tasked a child's parents with providing them with this early education. Moisiodax argued that to do this, parents needed to include their children in the daily functions of the nuclear family and shelter them from certain public functions such as weddings or gambling events. Moisiodax based his education reforms for the classroom on his own experiences as a young student. Moisiodax argued that Greek educators needed to punish children with less severity, and instead create punishments that fit their disobedient act. Greek educators also needed to create a curriculum that focused on developing the skill sets of individual pupils rather than a general curriculum meant to reach the class as a whole. According to Moisiodax, this curriculum needed to encompass practical as well as moral teachings to ensure that Greek students were educated in the ways of his "sound philosophy."

Furthermore, Moisiodax argued for the reform of Greek language education. Moisiodax believed that traditional grammar lessons should be replaced with lessons on specific pieces of Greek literature. Here, Moisiodax's argument stemmed from his belief that a student's understanding of the subliminal moral lessons found in classical Greek literature was more important than a rote knowledge of grammar. To promote this theory, Moisiodax supported the teaching of texts written by Aesop and Thucydides along with classical Greek texts. Moisiodax also argued that students should be taught to write using simple grammar in the Modern Greek language. Although he believed that Ancient Greek and Liturgical Hellenistic Greek could still be taught in schools, Moisiodax argued that learning Modern Greek was a utilitarian idea. It would be useful for students to learn Modern Greek since it was commonly used in several areas of Greek society including commerce and law.

==== The Greek Orthodox Church and education reform ====
The Greek Orthodox Church functioned as the institution by which Greek intellectuals maintained their traditional language and culture under Ottoman rule. The Greek Orthodox Church also had a conservative outlook on education at this time because of its adherence to the Aristotelian view of education. Nonetheless, members of the clergy such, as Moisiodax, used their elite positions in the Greek Orthodox Church to promote modern, enlightenment theories.

Moisiodax, as a deacon in the Greek Orthodox Church, was not opposed to teaching religion in schools, but argued for the integration of his "sound philosophy" into their curriculum to secularize education. Moisiodax also argued against the teaching of religious superstition in schools, mirroring John Locke's argument against the teaching of religious superstitions in medieval European education systems. Moisiodax argued that religious superstitions impeded on a student's ability to act as an enlightened member of society. Moisiodax's argument against religious superstition was also shaped by the teachings of Ludovico Antonio Muratori. Muratori argued that the Greek Orthodox Church needed to stop discussing Hell in their sermons to scare people into acting morally. Instead, people should be drawn to God through love rather than fear. Moisiodax's translation of Muratori's work entitled, Moral Philosophy served as the foundation for his argument that, out of moral necessity, "sound philosophy" needed to be integrated into the Greek education system. In this way, Greek society could progress through intellectual growth rather than through the propagation of religious superstition. Moisiodax and other Greek Orthodox clerics continued to argue against the teaching of religious superstition by bringing modern theories on education created during the Enlightenment into the context of the Greek Orthodox Church. Some of these theories were specifically from the works of Sir Isaac Newton. For example, Moisiodax looked favorably on Newton's physical theories and their explanations of the physical world through the natural sciences. Moisiodax used these theories to argue for the importance of integrating his "sound philosophy" into the Greek education system. Moisiodax argued that social and cultural change could best come about by explaining the natural world through natural sciences rather than religious superstitions.

=== Merit-based society ===
Moisiodax critiqued the inequalities created by the education system used by the Phanariots and other elites while Greece was under the Ottoman Empire's control. He argued that this system precluded Greek society from progressing because it only allowed elites to access the education system. This created societal inequalities based on someone's socioeconomic status rather than their merit. Under Ottoman rule, many elite Greek men advanced socially by undergoing an education to become a clergyman in the Greek Orthodox Church. People also attained a high social status if they were born into a Phanariot family. Despite their education, Moisiodax believed that the Phanariots lived vain and idle lives which eroded the moral fabric of society. Instead of working to attain wealth or status, many Phanariots relied on clientelism or family ties to sustain their wealth. Moisiodax suggested that this society implement reforms to create what theorists today would call a "civil society." In a "civil society," all people are provided with equal opportunities to advance socially through their own merit. For Moisiodax, the mercantile communities in the Greek Diaspora provided an example of a "civil society". These merchants succeeded socially because of the merit they gained through their education and hard work in commercial trade. Moisiodax's admiration for this society led him to develop a relationship with them. Through this relationship, the merchants came to admire Moisiodax's support for the teaching of Modern Greek in schools. As more students learned Modern Greek, the more this commercial society could grow since Modern Greek was necessary to participate in commerce across the Greek Diaspora. Several of these merchants provided Moisiodax with financial support which he used to publish his works that advocated for the teaching of Modern Greek.

=== Controversies ===
Moisiodax faced criticism and threats of violence for propagating his ideas. For example, many people who were loyal to the traditional system of education disavowed Moisiodax's teachings. Additionally, Moisiodax believed that he was criticized by some philosophers who supported the Ancients in the debate between the Ancients and the Moderns. He believed that these philosophers feared that their theories would become irrelevant if Greek society adopted modern philosophical theories. Nevertheless, Moisiodax felt it was his duty to spread the ideas of the Enlightenment. Moisiodax desired to spread his theories in the hopes of enlightening all Greeks. However, Moisiodax may not have faced as many violent criticisms as is believed. Moisiodax's long life and consistent production of works regarding social and cultural criticisms could support the theory that he was not violently repressed by his critics.

== Legacy ==
Rigas Feraios, a contemporary of Moisiodax who adhered to many of his theories, advocated for the creation of a separate Balkan society controlled by Greek speakers. For these views, Feraios was killed. Additionally, as their private tutor, Moisiodax's political views may have influenced two of Constantine Ypsilanti's sons, Alexander and Demetrius, in their decision to lead the Greek War of Independence in 1821. From his training under Dimitrios Katartzis, Moisiodax may have believed that Enlightened Absolutism was the political model that Greek society should have adopted. This theory stems from Moisiodax's support of a utilitarian and universal education in the hopes of fostering the growth of an enlightened Greek prince to lead a revolt against the Ottomans. However, Moisiodax also argued for a government founded on the basis of republicanism. This theory stems from Moisiodax's argument that Greek citizens, if given an equal opportunity to become enlightened intellectuals, could rise up and overthrow the Ottomans without an enlightened leader. In this way, Moisiodax's philosophies may impact Greece today as the country continues to debate over the Cyprus Question in the wake of the Greek War of Independence.

Though of Greek origin, Moisiodax served as a counterpart to Samuel Micu (1745–1806) in Transylvania, playing a pivotal role in Moldavia's intellectual transformation by challenging Corydalean neo-Aristotelianism and promoting the rationalist and empirical ideas of the European Enlightenment.

== Selected writings ==
- Ηθική Φιλοσοφία, Ethical Philosophy, translation of Lodovico Muratori's Filosofia Morale, Venice, 1761, 2 vol.
- Περί Παίδων Αγωγής ή Παιδαγωγία Treatise on the Education of the Youth, adaptation after John Locke and Fénelon with several original chapters, Venice, 1779
- Aπολογία Apology, Wien, 1780
- Θεωρία της Γεωγραφίας, The Theory of Geography, Wien, 1781 (written in 1767)
- Σημειώσεις Φυσιολογικαί, Philological notes, Bucharest, 1784

Translations to Greek

- Οδός Μαθηματική, by Alain Caillé
- Στοιχεία Μαθηματικών, by André Tacquet

Unpublished works

- Οδοί Φυσικής
- Επιτομή Αστρονομίας κατά τους Νεωτέρους

== Sources ==
- Paschalis M. Kitromilides, The Enlightenment as Social Criticism: Iosipos Moisiodax and Greek Culture in the Eighteenth Century, 1992. ISBN 0-691-07383-X.
- Paschalis M. Kitromilides, "Cultural change and social criticism: the case of Iossipos Moisiodax," in Idem, Enlightenment, Nationalism, Orthodoxy: Studies in the Culture and Political Thought of Southeastern Europe (Aldershot, Ashgate Variorum, 1994) (Variorum Collected Studies, CS453),
- Balázs Trencsényi, Michal Kopeček, Discourses of collective identity in Central and Southeast Europe (1770–1945), Central European University Press, 2006, ISBN 963-7326-52-9
