= Soudena =

Soudena (Greek: Σουδενά) may refer to the following places in Greece:

- Soudena Agiou Vasileiou, the former name of Kato Lousoi, Kalavryta municipality, Achaea
- Soudena Theotokou, the former name of Ano Lousoi, Kalavryta municipality, Achaea
- Ano Soudena, the former name of Ano Pedina, Ioannina regional unit
- Kato Soudena, the former name of Kato Pedina, Ioannina regional unit
