= Lambros Photiadis =

Greek scholar

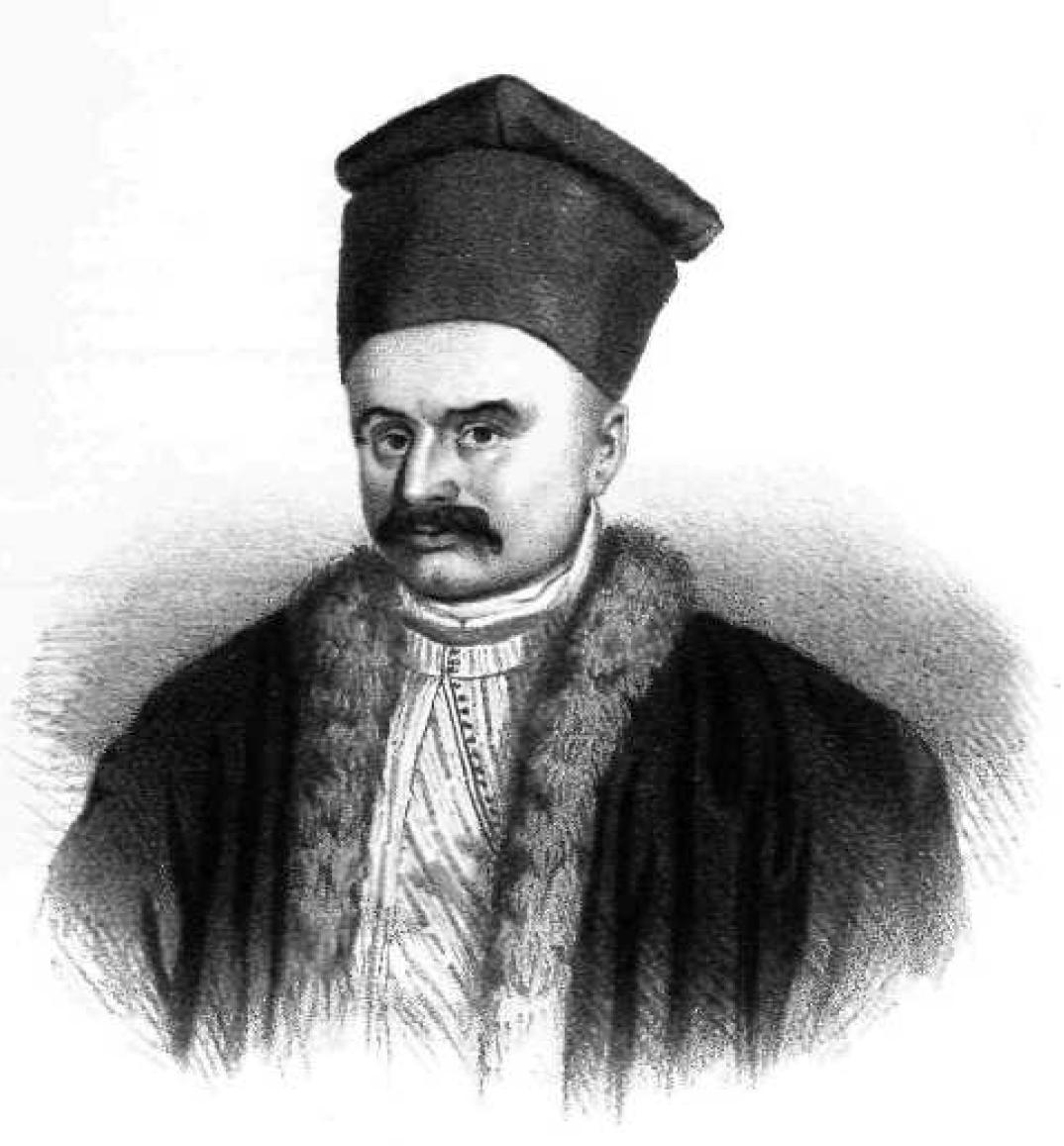
Lambros Photiadis

Lambros Photiadis (Greek: Λάμπρος Φωτιάδης, 1752–1805) was a Greek scholar, director of the Princely Academy of Bucharest and representative of the modern Greek Enlightenment.

== Life ==
Photiadis was born in Ioannina (Epirus), northwestern Greece, when the region was under Ottoman rule. After finishing ground level studies in his home town he went to Bucharest. There he was a member of the court of the local lord, Alexander Mourousis. Moreover, he became a teacher at the Princely Academy of Bucharest, a notable educational institution focused on Greek language and culture. In 1792 he was appointed director of the institution, position he kept for 13 years, until his death in 1805. During this period the academy reached its peak of popularity. During the same period Photiadis held the office of the inspector of the Greek schools of Wallachia.

== Work ==
Photiadis introduced progressive teaching methods at the Greek schools in Wallachia and especially in the teaching of Ancient Greek, in order to become easily understood by his students. He attracted a large number of Greek students, from all over the Ottoman Empire and as a result Bucharest became one of the leading centers of culture for the Greek people that time. However, Photiadis was the teacher of various personalities that latter played a prominent role in the political and cultural renaissance of their nations: Greeks (Neophytos Doukas, Athanasios Christopoulos, Michael Christaris), Romanians (Dinicu Golescu) and Bulgarians (Nikola Pikolo).

Although a progressive teacher, Photiades adopted a conservative approach in the Greek language question. He insisted in the use of archaic instead of vernacular Greek in education, but without rejecting the use of vernacular entirely.
