= Eufrosin Poteca =

Romanian academic

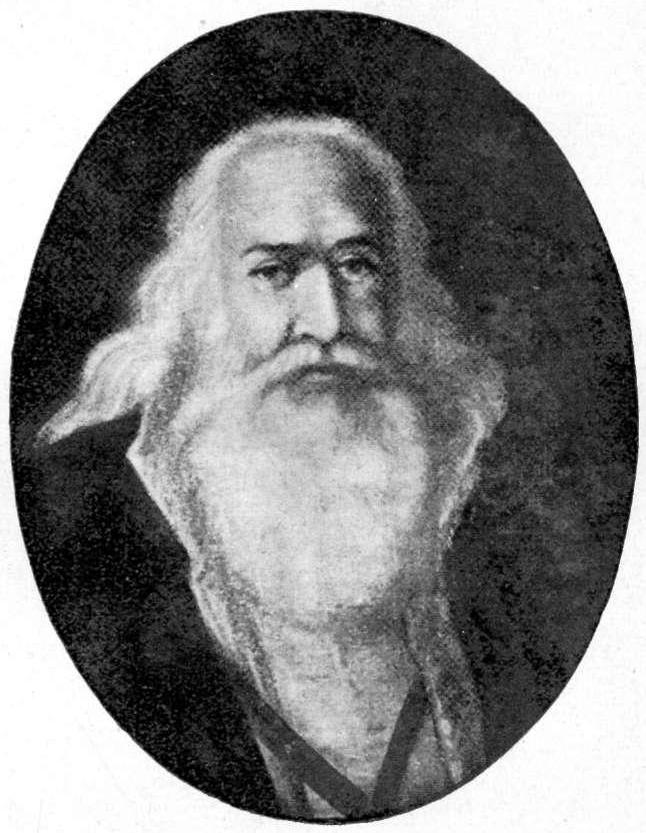
Eufrosin Poteca

Eufrosin Poteca (Romanian pronunciation: [ˌe.ufroˈsin poˈteka]; born Radu Poteca; 1786 – 10 December 1858) was a Romanian philosopher, theologian, and translator, professor at the Saint Sava Academy of Bucharest. Later in life he campaigned against slavery. He was the grandfather of the Romanian philosopher Constantin Rădulescu-Motru.

== Biography ==
=== Early life ===
Poteca was born Radu Poteca in 1786, in the village of Nucșoara, Prahova County, in Wallachia, into a family of peasants.

He began his elementary education with the priest from the village's church, and continued his studies in a Greek-language school. In order to continue his education, he first went to Căldărușani Monastery and later to Neamț Monastery, the place where Paisius Velichkovsky had laid the basis of a strong hesychast monastic life. It is there that, in 1806, he became a monk and took the name "Eufrosin". In 1808 he moved to Bucharest. On March 28, 1809, he was ordained hierodeacon, and on January 21, 1813, he was tonsured hieromonk.

=== Studies ===
From 1813 to 1816 he studied under Konstantinos Vardalachos, a famous professor of the time, at the Greek-language Princely Academy of Bucharest. From 1816 until 1818 Poteca was a teacher of dogmatics at the same academy, which was then directed by Neophytos Doukas. In 1818, while Benjamin Lesvios was the director of the Greek-speaking Academy, Gheorghe Lazăr began giving lectures in Romanian, at the Saint Sava monastery, thus founding a Romanian-language Academy. Eufrosin Poteca became professor of geography at this academy, between 1818 and 1820.

Poteca was one of four students sent abroad to study at Western universities by the Ephory (office) of the Schools, as there was a perceived need for Romanian-speaking professors at the national schools. Between 1820 and 1823, he studied at the University of Pisa (Italian, Latin, philosophy, theology, history, politics, literature, experimental chemistry), and between 1823 and 1825 he studied at the University of Paris.

=== Professorship ===
Returning to Walachia in October 1825, he was appointed Professor of philosophy at the Saint Sava Academy, where he taught until 1828, when Bucharest was occupied by the Russian Army. In 1828–1829 he went to Buda, where he printed his translation from Johann Gottlieb Heineccius's work, Elementa Philosophiae Rationalis et Moralis (1726), a handbook of history of philosophy, logic and ethics. At the University of Pest, he assisted at the lectures of János Imre, an eclectic philosopher who promoted "critical-rational synthetism", a philosophy that made metaphysics possible against Kant, arguing that most metaphysical judgements are "analytical a priori", judgements unaffected by the Kantian criticism of metaphysics.

In 1830 Poteca was forced to retire by General Pavel Kiselyov, under the pretext that he was too old. In fact, Poteca had been outspoken in his speeches that slavery should be abolished, because it contradicts both Christian religion and natural law. For Poteca the teachings of Jesus Christ were identical to those of the nature, and they could be synthesised in the Golden Rule; or, having slaves is against this moral principle. The Walachian boyars were in opposition to his opinions, and had decided to eliminate Poteca if he continued; the Metropolitan didn't approve of Poteca, because he resented fasting, the theology of death, and even celibacy. These were the true reasons for which Poteca was banned to the Gura Motrului Monastery, in Oltenia.

=== Later days ===
Beginning with 1832, Eufrosin Poteca spent his life at this monastery, as its hegumen. While there, he continued his cultural activity, translating and publishing works of Western authors. He had a relationship with the wife of a local priest (Orthodox priests can marry; they are not obligated to be celibate), from which resulted a son, Radu Popescu. He employed this son, whose identity was not made public, as his private secretary. Radu Popescu’s son, Constantin Rădulescu-Motru, was an important Romanian philosopher. Eufrosin Poteca died at this monastery, where he is buried, on December 10, 1858.

== Selected bibliography ==
=== Original works ===
- Panegirical and Moral Discourses, Bucharest, 1826.
- "Meditation on the Improvement of the Orthodox Clergy" (1838), in Noua Revistă Română, vol. 3, 1901, nr. 26, pp. 99–102
- Handbook of Religious and Moral Catechism, Containing the Dogmas and the Sacraments of our Church, Buzău, 1839
- "The History of Walachia's Monasteries or Ruling Princes, Especially the Religious Issues, in Chronological Order, from Radu Negru Voievod until Our Days" (1846), in G. Dem. Teodorescu, Eufrosin Poteca Motrénul, Bucharest, Tipografia Gutenberg, Joseph Göbl, 1899
- The Small Catechism, Containing the Dogmas and the Mysteries of the Church of the Orient, for the Education of the Children, published by Constantin Rădulescu-Motru, Bucharest, 1940
- Sermons and Speeches, introductory study and notes by Archim. Vaniamin Micle, Bistriţa Monastery Printing Press, 1993
- Autobiographical Notes, edition by A. Michiduță, Craiova, Aius, 2005

=== Translations and adaptations ===
- Prolegomena to the Knowledge of God by the Examination of what Exists, translation from a work of Dimitrios Darvaris, Buda, 1818
- Elements of Metaphysics (1826), heavily based on Francesco Soave's Istituzioni di metafisica (the Pisa edition, 1814), in Biserica Ortodoxă Română, XCIX, 1981, nr.5-6, pp. 675–689
- "The Philosophy of Discourse and of Morals, or the Elementary Logic and Ethics, Prefaced by the History of Philosophy", translation of Heineccius' Elementa Philosophiae Rationalis et Moralis (1726), supplemented with several original texts by Poteca, Buda, 1829; second edition 2006, Craiova, Aius, critical edition, introductory study and notes by A. Michiduţă (this edition is supplemented with letters, documents, speeches and other texts by Poteca, not appearing in the first edition).
- The Habits of the Israelites and of the Christians, translation of Claude Fleury's Les moeurs des Israélites (1681) and Les moeurs des Chrétiens (1682), Bucharest, 1845
- Little Fast, or Selected Sermons, translation of Jean-Baptiste Massillon's Petit Carême (1718), Bucharest, 1846
- Discourse on the Universal History, translation of Bossuet's Discours sur l'histoire universelle (1681), Bucharest, 1855.
