= Daniel Philippidis =

Greek scholar

Daniel Philippidis (Greek: Δανιήλ Φιλιππίδης; Romanian: Dimitrie Daniil Philippide; c. 1750 – 1832) was a Greek scholar, figure of the modern Greek Enlightenment and member of the patriotic organization Filiki Etaireia. He was one of the most active scholars of the Greek diaspora in the Danubian Principalities and Western Europe. Philippidis mainly wrote geographical and historical works as well as translated important handbooks of science and philosophy.

== Life ==
Philippidis was born in Milies, a village in Thessaly, Ottoman Empire (present-day Greece), and received early schooling in his home town. He attended the Athonite Academy, in Mount Athos but the poor quality of teaching after the departure of Eugenios Voulgaris frustrated him and in 1779 he continued his studies at the School of Saint Minas in Chios. A year later he moved to Romania and studied at the Princely Academy of Bucharest under notable scholars such as Neophytos Kavsokalyvitis. Philippidis remained in Bucharest until 1784 and became a teacher at the Princely Academy of Iaşi from 1784 to 1786.

In 1788 he moved to Vienna, where he became acquainted with Anthimos Gazis, scholar and publisher of the periodical Hermes o Logios. Two years later he is found in Paris, where he witnessed the outbreak of the French Revolution. His stay in Paris was crucial for the development of his philosophical and scientific views. There he had the opportunity to attend lessons presented by important scientists such as the astronomer Jérôme Lalande and the geographer Jean-Denis Barbié du Bocage. Philippidis left Paris in 1794, possibly because of the violent developments following the French Revolution, which had disappointed him. After a series of moves he settled again in Iaşi (1796). For a short period (1803–06) he taught in the local Princely Academy, despite the objections of its conservative scholar and thanks to the support of the prince Alexander Mourousis, who intended to upgrade the Academy.

In 1810 Philippidis travelled for a second time to Paris, where he remained for two years. During this period his relations with Adamantios Korais, a leading figure of the Greek Enlightenment, became tense, possibly because of disagreements on linguistic and philosophical grounds. At the following years (1812–15) he lived in Chişinău, Bessarabia, Russian Empire, as assistant to the scholar and local bishop Gavril Bănulescu-Bodoni, and later (1815–18) in Leipzig in order to oversee the publication of his works. He returned to Iaşi in 1818. The next year he became a member of the Greek patriotic organization Filiki Etaireia, but did not return to Greece despite an invitation of the conservative scholar Neophytos Doukas. He died in Bălţi, Bessarabia, in November 1832.

== Work ==
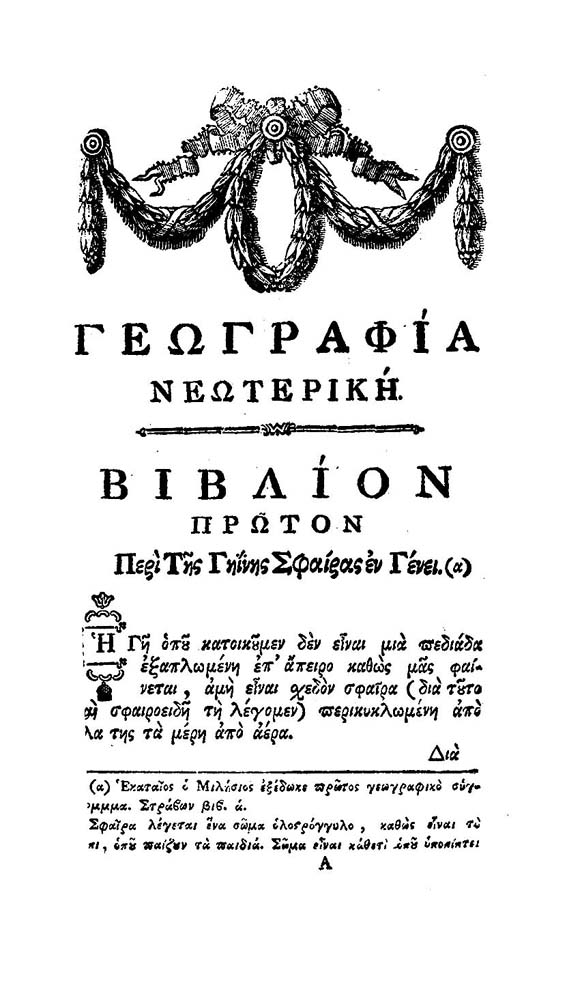
Chapter 1 of Geographia Neoteriki.

His work includes geographical, historical essays, and translations of important European handbooks of science and philosophy. In 1791, Daniel Philippidis together with Grigorios Konstantas wrote the Geographia Neoteriki (Greek: Γεωγραφία Νεωτερική, Modern Geography), a work which is considered as one of the most remarkable of the modern Greek Enlightenment movement. They addressed the political instability and the economic decay of the Ottoman Empire and reflected a new revolutionary era in European history after the outbreak of the French Revolution. This work was welcomed with enthousiasm by western intellectuals, especially in France, on the other hand it was largely neglected among Greek scholars, mainly due to the vernacular (Demotic) language the authors used.

In 1816 Pilippidis published two books dedicated to the history and geography of Romania: Ιστορία της Ρουμουνίας, (History of Romania), and Γεωγραφικόν της Ρουμουνίας, (Geographical account of Romania) in Leipzig, in which he adopted the views of various contemporary Romanian scholars. He examined the history of the three Romanian principalities, Walachia, Moldavia, and Transylvania, through an acceptance of their historical unity. On the other hand, Greek intellectuals, and especially those involved with the journal Hermes o Logios printed in Vienna from 1811 to 1821, adopted a negative attitude toward Philippidis' historical studies and linguistic approach in the Greek language question.

In 1817 he wrote the philosophical work Απόπειρα Αναλύσεως του Νοουμένου (Attempt to analyze thought, Leipzig). Philippidis also translated a number of works including:

- Λογική (Logic by Étienne Bonnot de Condillac), Vienna, 1801
- Επιτομή της Αστρονομίας, (Astronomic Epitomes by Jérôme Lalande), Vienna, 1803
- Επιτομή των Φιλιππικών, (Epitome of Philippic history by Pompeius Trogus), Leipzig, 1817
- Επιτομή των Ρωμαϊκών, (Epitome of Roman history by Florus), Leipzig, 1818
