= Grigorios Konstantas =

Greek scholar

Grigorios Konstantas (Greek: Γρηγόριος Κωνσταντάς; 1753–1844) was a Greek scholar and figure of the modern Greek Enlightenment. He was actively involved in various educational issues as well as participated in the Greek War of Independence.

== Life ==
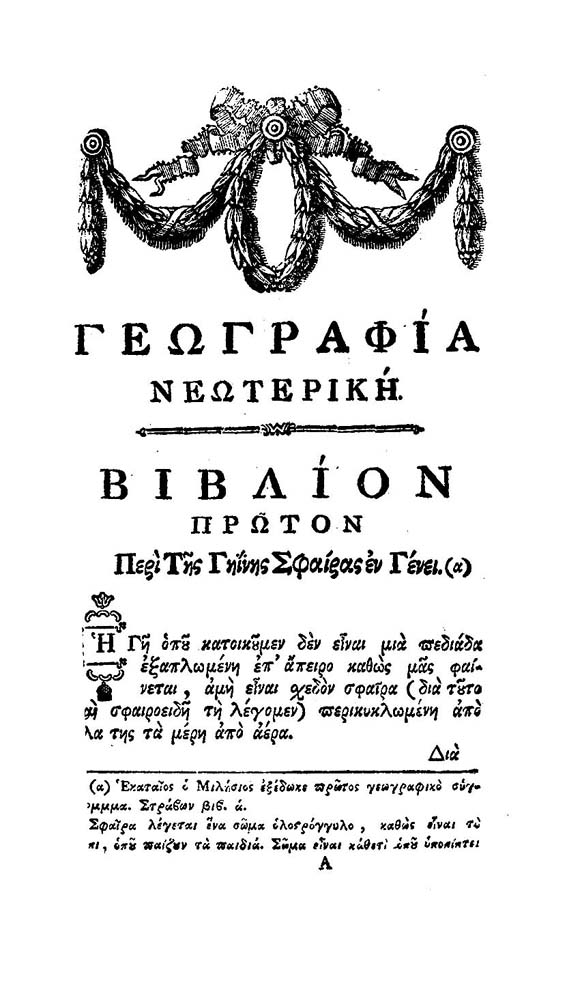
Chapter 1 of Geographia Neoteriki.

Konstantas was born in the village of Milies, Thessaly, Ottoman Empire (present-day Greece), where he received early schooling. At the age of 20 he went to Mount Athos, Chios and Constantinople (Istanbul) where he attended courses in ecclesiastical schools. In 1780 he moved to Bucharest and in 1784 he started his teaching activity in the local Princely Academy. In 1788 he went to a number of European cities (Vienna, Halle, Padua) to continue his studies, while in 1803 he negotiated with Anthimos Gazis the establishment of an advanced educational institution in his birthplace, which would contain a library of 4,000 volumes. His initiative was supported by Gazis and was only partially realized in 1814–16 because the Ottoman authorities limited the school's functions. In the meantime he rejected an offer to teach at the Academy of Iasi and another one to become head of the Patriarchical Academy in Constantinople.

Before the outbreak of the Greek War of Independence (1821–1830), Anthimos Gazis suggested Konstantas to join the patriotic organization Filiki Etaireia. Konstantas rejected the offer, however, when the revolution broke up, he joined the revolutionary forces. He also became one of the delegates in the Fourth National Assembly at Argos, 1829. When Greek independence was established he worked as a teacher in the orphanage of Aegina, an institution founded by the head of the newly formed Greek state, Ioannis Kapodistrias. With the arrival of Prince Otto he left the orphanage and in 1835 he returned to his hometown, which was still under Ottoman rule. There he continued his teaching activity until his death, in 1844.

== Work ==
In 1791 Konstantas, together with another cleric and scholar, Daniel Philippidis wrote the Geographia Neoteriki (Greek: Γεωγραφία Νεωτερική), which is considered as one of the most remarkable works of the modern Greek Enlightenment. It reflected a new revolutionary era in European history after the outbreak of the French Revolution and aired sharp social criticism castigating the corruption of the church authorities, the idleness of monasticism and popular superstition. This work was welcomed with enthusiasm by western intellectuals, especially in France; however, it was largely neglected among Greek scholars, mainly due to the vernacular (Demotic) language the authors used.

Konstantas also edited an anonymous work attributed to Nicholas Mavrocordatos, Φιλοθέου Πάρεργα (The Parerga of Philotheos), printed in Venice, 1800. Moreover, he translated a number of works including:

- Στοιχεία της Λογικής, Μεταφυσικής και Ηθικής (Elements of Logic, Metaphysics and Ethics, by Francesco Soave), Venice, 1804
- Γενική Ιστορία (General history by Abbe Milliot), Venice, 1806
