= Mircea Florian (philosopher) =

Romanian philosopher and translator

Mircea Florian (Romanian: [ˈmirtʃe̯a floriˈan]; April 1, 1888 – October 31, 1960) was a Romanian philosopher and translator. Active mainly during the interwar period, he was noted as one of the leading proponents of rationalism, opposing it to the Trăirist philosophy of Nae Ionescu. His work, comprising some 20 books, shows Florian as a disciple of centrists and rationalists such as Constantin Rădulescu-Motru and Titu Maiorescu.

Active in independent social democratic politics, the philosopher became a political prisoner under the communist regime. It was during his time in jail that Florian conceived his philosophical system, published after his death in the treatise Recesivitatea ca structură a lumii ("Recessivity as World Structure"). In 1990, he was made a posthumous member of the Romanian Academy.

== Biography ==
Born in Bucharest, Florian graduated from the Faculty of Letters and Philosophy at the local university, where he became a disciple of Rădulescu-Motru and P. P. Negulescu. He afterward took his PhD at the University of Greifswald, in the German Empire, with a thesis on Henri Bergson's notion of time. In later years, he found employment as a Bucharest University assistant and substitute professor, lecturing in the History of Philosophy. He was a Docent from 1916.

During World War I, Florian served in the Romanian Land Forces and was taken prisoner by the Germans. He was transported to an internment camp at Krefeld, alongside figures such as Alexandru D. Strurdza and Ilie Moscovici. Eventually, Florian was freed by his captors and allowed to lecture at King Carol Foundation in Bucharest, under a German occupation government. As Florian later indicated, this was made possible by the intercession of a Germanophile scholar, Alexandru Tzigara-Samurcaș, who vouched for him, and by the protection of Constantin Giurescu. Following the November Armistice, which reinstated the pro-Allied government, Florian, Tzigara-Samurcaș and Rădulescu-Motru were all subject to an official inquiry, and accused of being collaborators. The University Commissions created for this task were largely ineffective, and, among the incriminated, Florian was one of few who presented himself for questioning.

In the wake of the war, Florian was in contact with Ideea Europeană, Rădulescu-Motru's magazine, and went on its conference tour, alongside in various cities by, among others, Nae Ionescu, Cora Irineu, Octav Onicescu, Virgil Bărbat, and Emanoil Bucuța. However, in later years, he remained largely cut off from his public: said to have been shy in delivering his lectures, he led a private life, and dedicated himself, almost entirely, to research.

He wrote a large body of works over a short time, including such titles as: Îndrumare în filosofie ("Philosophical Companion"), Rostul și utilitatea filosofiei ("The Purpose and Use of Philosophy"), Știință și raționalism ("Science and Rationalism"), Cosmologia elenă ("Hellenic Cosmology"), Antinomiile credinței ("The Antinomies of Faith"), Kant și criticismul până la Fichte ("Kant and the Critical Method before Fichte"), Cunoaștere și existență ("Knowledge and Being"), Reconstrucție filosofică ("Philosophical Reconstruction"), Metafizică și artă ("Metaphysics and Art"), Misticism și credință ("Mysticism and Faith"). Although absorbed by his academic work, Florian affiliated with social democracy, and was a member of the Social Democratic Party, the Constantin Titel Petrescu wing.

Florian's philosophy developed from ideas common to both Rădulescu-Motru and the 19th-century thinker Titu Maiorescu, herald of Romania's moderate and critical approach to philosophy. Florian is therefore ranked among the third-generation "Maiorescans", and seen as reactivating the spirit of Maiorescu's literary club Junimea. After World War I, the Junimist legacy came in direct contradiction with Nae Ionescu's critique of rationalism, which was growing in popularity and lending its support to the far right's causes. Florian's steady opposition to Ionescu, in both concept and method, has been described as the "dualism" of interwar Romanian philosophy.

By the time of World War II, Florian was still pursuing a debate with the two schools of irrationalism, promoted by Lucian Blaga and Constantin Noica. Granted a full professorship in 1940, he was presented for Romanian Academy membership by his mentor Rădulescu-Motru, but the proposal failed to gather support. Blaga gave poor reviews to his work in Saeculum magazine, and, in one (disputed) interpretation, may have portrayed him as the unknown adversary in the virulent lampoon Săpunul filozofic ("Philosophic Soap", 1943). According to literary historian Z. Ornea, Florian's relative lack of exposure is unfair, since his works may rank better than those of either Noica or Blaga. Florian was also an adversary of official fascism, before and during the Ion Antonescu dictatorship. Like Grigore T. Popa, Constantin I. Parhon, Alexandru Rosetti, Mihai Ralea, and several other academics, he was in contact with the underground Romanian Communist Party and the Union of Patriots, and, as such, kept under close surveillance by the Siguranța Statului agents.

Florian's stance, and especially his commitment to independent social democracy, made him a suspect upon the establishment of Romania's communist regime. As noted by researcher Victor Frunză, Florian and Alexandru Claudian made a "high sacrifice" when they refused to give in to "blackmail" and would not join the "Workers' Party" (as the Communist Party styled itself upon its absorption of Social Democratic sympathizers). In 1948, he was stripped of his university chair. Placed under constant surveillance by the Securitate, Romania's new secret police, he was soon after arrested. During his eight-month-long imprisonment without trial, he had the revelation on "recessivity as world structure". The new system evidenced that Florian had come to criticize some of the basic assumptions in Western philosophy, and conceiving of the world through the teachings of genetics. His system divided existence alongside its two, equal but alternating, attributes: the dominant trait tempered by the recessive (albeit not degraded) one; violence to love, rational to irrational, nationalism to supranationalism.

The imprisonment is said to have been a grueling experience: allegedly, his wife Angela no longer recognized him upon his return to the family home. A while after, Florian was partly reintegrated into academia, and assigned a researcher's position at the Institute of Philosophy. There, he dedicated himself to translating Aristotle's Organon, while in committing his Recesivitatea to paper in his spare time.

Recesivitatea was only published 23 years after Florian's death, with Editura Eminescu. Reportedly, the text had suffered cuts and interventions by communist censors. Florian's role was reconsidered mainly after the Romanian Revolution of 1989, when he was made a posthumous member of the academy. His full work was recovered for the public and reviewed by philosopher Mircea Flonta, in a 1998 volume of essays.
