= Sevastos Kyminitis =

Pontic Greek scholar (1630–1703)

Sevastos Kiminitis or Sebastos Kyminites (Pontic: Σεβαστός Κυμινήτης) (1630-1703) was a Pontic Greek scholar who was born in a village close to Τrebizond, Pontus. He was principal of the Patriarchal Academy in Constantinople in the years 1671–1682. He left Constantinople in 1682 and moved to Τrebizond where he founded a Greek language school, known as Phrontisterion of Trapezous. Around 1689 he moved to Bucharest to become principal of the Princely Academy of Bucharest. He died there in 1703.
