= Saint Sava College =

Saint Sava College was one of the earliest academic institutions in Wallachia, Romania. It was the predecessor to both Saint Sava National College and the University of Bucharest.

== History ==
It was the continuator of the Princely Academy from Bucharest, and was initially located in the buildings of Saint Sava Monastery, nowadays the site of the University of Bucharest. Its origins are connected to the lectures delivered in Romanian by Gheorghe Lazăr in the Princely Academy, beginning in 1818. After the Filiki Eteria movement from 1821, the Ottoman Sultan forbade the existence of Greek schools, but he allowed the existence of Romanian schools. Thus, by the efforts of Lazăr and of other professors that associated with him, like Eufrosin Poteca, Ion Heliade Rădulescu, Vasile Ardelean, a.k.a. Laszlo Erdely, or Petrache Poenaru, the Saint Sava Academy managed to hold the same academic level as the former Greek-language Princely Academy. The Academy was split in 1864 on orders from Domnitor Alexandru Ioan Cuza, the purely academic branch being converted into the University of Bucharest, while the secondary education one was organized as the current Saint Sava National College.

== See also ==
- Princely Academy of Bucharest

== Sources ==
- Pop, Ștefan (1933). "Colegiul Național Sf Sava". Boabe de grâu - Revistă de cultură. Vol. IV, no. 7. pp. 386–419.
