= Princely Academy of Bucharest =

The Princely Academy of Bucharest (Romanian: Academia Domnească din București; Greek: Αυθεντική Ακαδημία Βουκουρεστίου) was an institution of higher education, active from the end of the 17th century to the beginning of the 19th century.

== History ==
According to some scholars, the Academy was most likely founded during the reign of Şerban Cantacuzino (1678–1688). Others believe that the initiative belonged to Constantin Brâncoveanu together with his uncle, Constantin Cantacuzino, in 1694, or to Gheorghe Duca (1675).

The institution underwent several reorganisations, under Gheorghe Ghica, Constantine Mavrocordatos, Constantin Racoviţă and Alexandru Ipsilanti. The Academy’s language of study was Greek, the universal language of culture in the Eastern Orthodox world. For the most part, the teachers were also Greek. The students of the Academy came from all over the Orthodox world. In 1818 Gheorghe Lazăr began teaching courses in Romanian. In 1821, as a consequence of the increasing activity of the Greek patriotic organization, Filiki Eteria, the Greek-speaking Academy was disestablished, and replaced with a similar institution where teaching was done in Romanian, the Saint Sava Academy.

== Organisation and curriculum ==
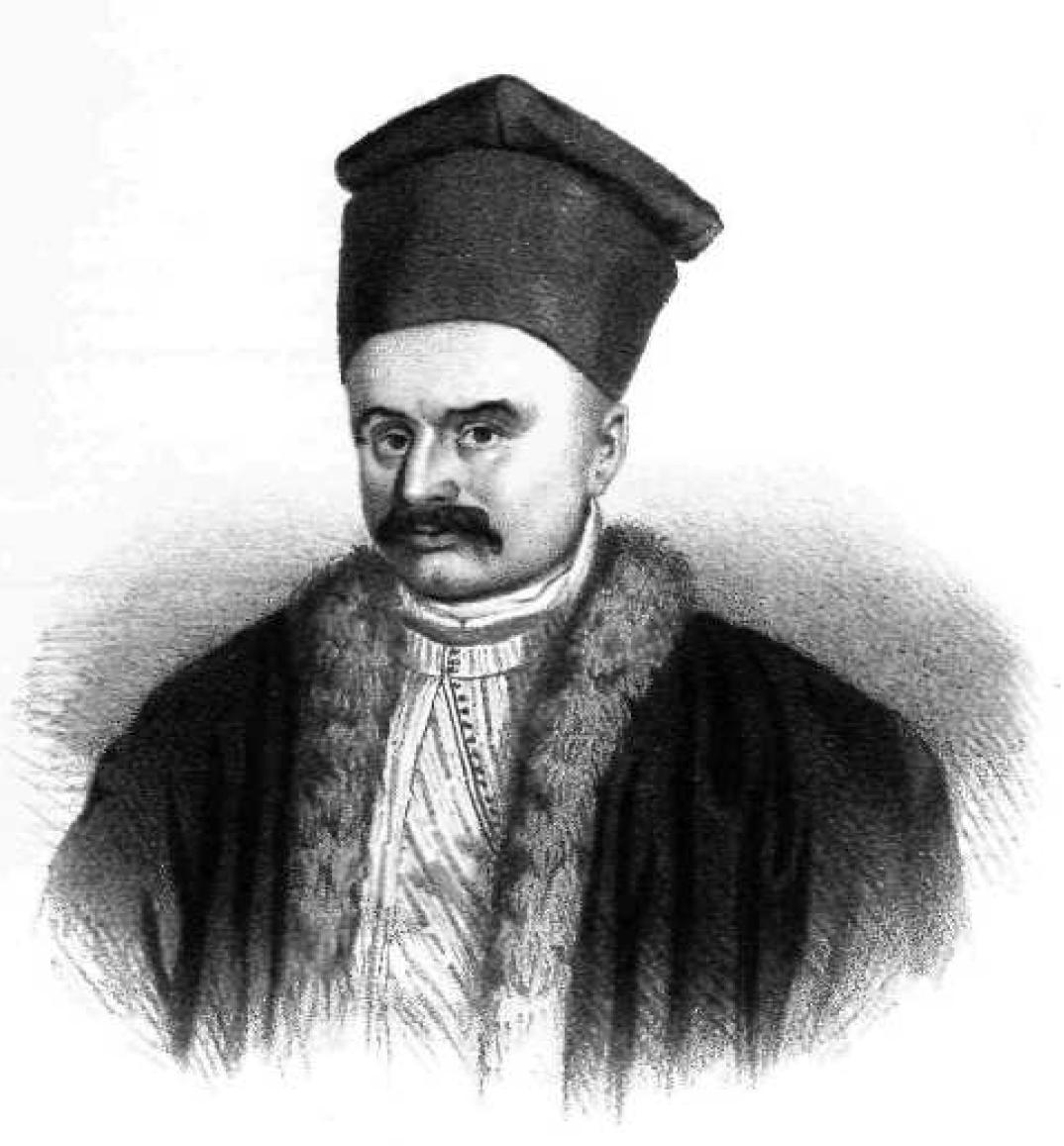
Lambros Photiadis; Principal from 1792 to 1805.

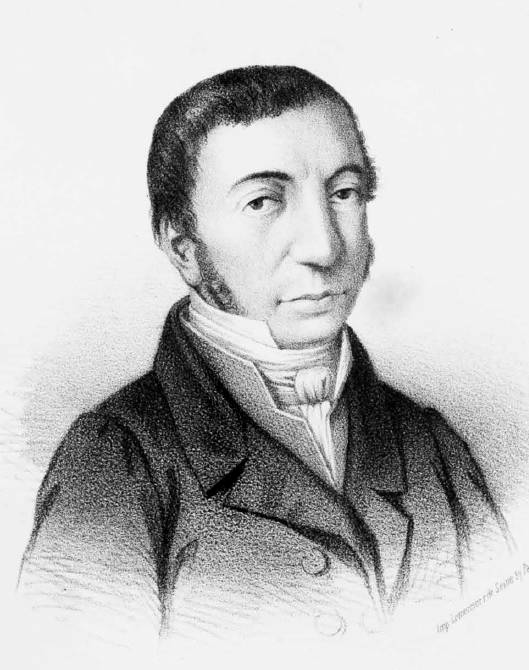
Constantinos Vardalachos; Principal from 1805 to 1815.

We do not know very much about the Academy’s structure before the reforms of Ipsilanti. From 1776, however, by the decree of Ipsilanti, the studies in the Academy were organised in 5 cycles, each of them lasting 3 years. The first three-year cycle was dedicated to the study of the Greek and Latin grammar. The following was dedicated to the study of Greek, Latin, and classic literature. In the third cycle the students studied poetics, rhetoric, Aristotle’s ethics, Italian and French. In the fourth cycle the arithmetic and the geometry, as well as the history and the geometry were taught. Finally, the last cycle was dedicated to the study of philosophy and astronomy. If at the beginning the teaching was done mostly after the commentaries of Korydaleos to the works of Aristotle, later the courses took a modern orientation. The natural sciences, the philosophy, were taught after occidental handbooks, many of them translated in Greek.

== Notable teachers ==
- Sevastos Kyminitis (1689–1703)
- Grigorios Konstantas (1782–1787)
- Lambros Photiadis (1792–1805, Principal)
- Constantinos Vardalachos (1803–1815 [Principal: 1805-1815]; 1820–1821)
- Neophytos Doukas (1815–1818)
- Stephanos Kommitas (1816–1818)
- Veniamin Lesvios (1818)
- Rigas Feraios (1757–1798)
- Georgios Gennadios (1784–1854)

== Notable alumni ==
- Grigorie Brâncoveanu
- Dinicu Golescu
- Iordache Golescu
- Ion Heliade Rădulescu
- Daniel Philippidis
- Petrache Poenaru
- Eufrosin Poteca
- Barbu Ştirbei
- Alecu Văcărescu
- Ienăchiță Văcărescu
- Nicolae Văcărescu
- Stefan Bogoridi

== See also ==
- Princely Academy of Iaşi

== Sources ==
- Camariano-Cioran, Ariadna, Les Academies princières de Bucarest et de Jassy et leurs professeurs, Thessaloniki : Institute for Balkan Studies, 1974
