= Athonite Academy =

- Αθωνιάς Εκκλησιαστική Ακαδημία
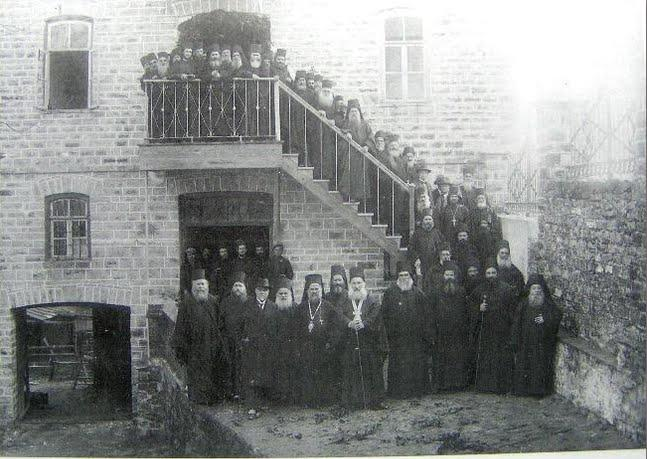
- Athonite Academy

Location
- Vatopedi Monastery (1749–1821); Karyes (since 1845), Mount Athos; Greece
- Coordinates: 40.2615°N 24.2448°E

Information
- Type: Academy (1749–1821); Secondary male school and Seminary (present)
- Established: 1749
- Founder: Ecumenical Patriarch Cyril V
- Closed: 1820 and re-established at 1845
- Headmaster: Ierotheos Zacharis
- Website: http://www.athoniada.gr/

The Athonite or Athonias Academy (Greek: Αθωνιάς Εκκλησιαστική Ακαδημία) is a Greek Orthodox educational institution founded at 1749 in Mount Athos, then in the Ottoman Empire and now in Greece. The school offered high level education, where ancient philosophy and modern physical science were taught. With the establishment of the Athonite Academy the local monastic community took a leading role in the modern Greek Enlightenment during the 18th century. It aroused the hostility of more conservative circles and was shut down in 1821, but reopened in 1842. The Academy's function was also suspended in 1916–1930 and 1940–1953 due to the World Wars.

== Establishment ==
The Athonias was founded in 1749 as a dependency of Vatopedi monastery with the initiative and the financial support of the Ecumenical Patriarch of Constantinople Cyril V. The first building of the Athonias was erected on the top of a hill northeast of Vadopedi, where its imposing ruins still exist today. First director became the theologian Neophytos Kafsokalyvitis.

== Modern Greek Enlightenment ==
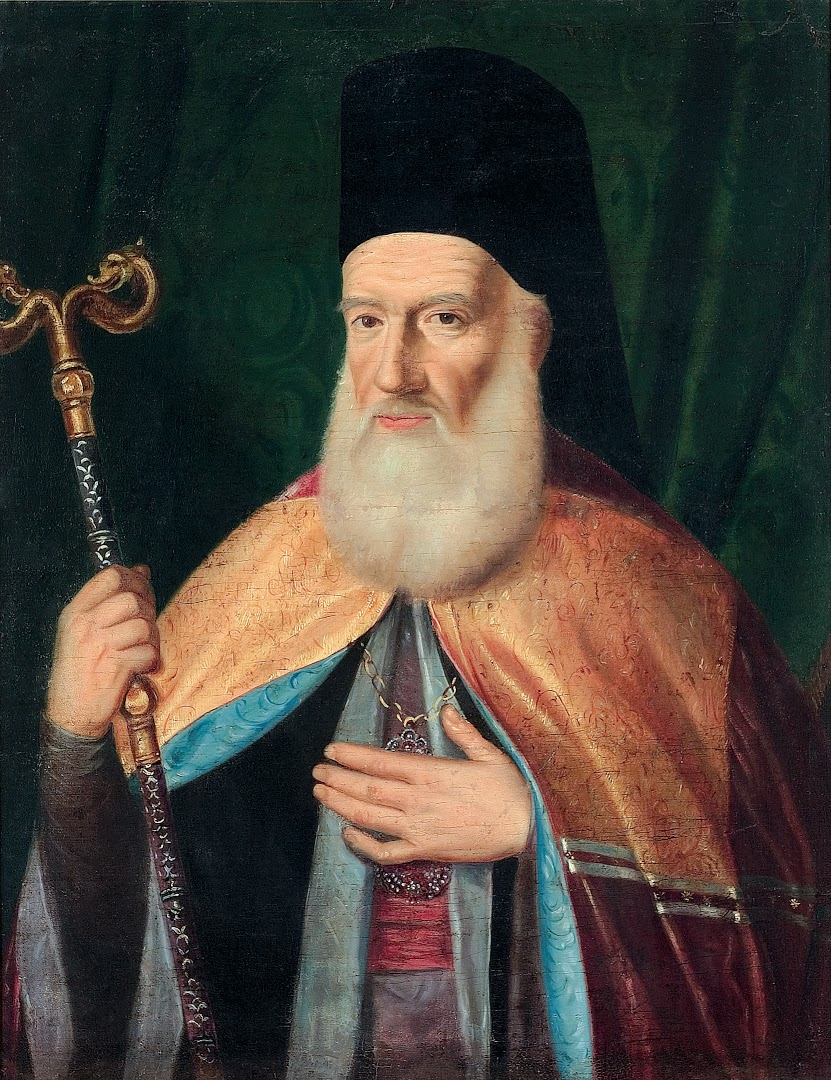
Eugenios Voulgaris (1716-1806), scholar, theologian and figure of the modern Greek Enlightenment.

In 1753, the Ecumenical Patriarchate entrusted Eugenios Voulgaris with the renewal of ecclesiastical education because it considered that he possessed the best available talents and offered him the post of the Academy's director. The time when Voulgaris became director of the Athonias (1753–1759), the modern Greek Enlightenment movement was exerting a productive influence throughout the entire monastic community of Mount Athos. The teaching methods of Voulgaris for the revival and upgrading of learning within the Orthodox Church envisaged a substantial training in classic studies combined with an exposure to modern European philosophy, including works of René Descartes, Gottfried Leibniz, Christian Wolff and John Locke. This curriculum could only be taught in a monastic environment for as long as Voulgaris enjoyed the full and unswerving support of the highest powers inside the church.

When Cyril V fell from the patriarchal throne conservative circles of Mount Athos were encouraged to come out openly against the progressive educational methods of Voulgaris. The latter, feeling abandoned, resigned in 1758/9 and was replaced by Nikolaos Zerzoulis, who was known as one of the first proponents of Newtonian science in Greek education. However, by the end of the 18th century the rate of literacy in Mount Athos had declined and the traditional local circles became hostile towards the progressive teaching in the Athonias.

== 19th century – present ==
The Athonias was closed in 1821 when the Greek War of Independence broke out and reopened in 1845 in Karyes, the administrative center of Mount Athos. It was financially supported by the monasteries and the monks of the region. The Academy's function was also suspended in 1916–1930 and 1940–1953 due to World War I and World War II.

== Notable graduates ==
- Cosmas of Aetolia
- Athanasius Parios
- Nicodemus the Hagiorite
- Rigas Feraios
- Iosipos Moisiodax
- Eulogios Kourilas
