= Dimitrios Katartzis =

Phanariote Greek scholar

Dimitrios Katartzis (Greek: Δημήτριος Καταρτζής; 1730-1807) or Photiadis was a Phanariote Greek scholar. He grew up in an affluent and esteemed family in Constantinople and was educated there. He occupied various offices in the Phanariote administration of the Danubian Principalities, achieving the rank of grand logothete in Wallachia, where he also died.

"He was a great proponent of the Greek language being used in books as one of the major languages of civilisation. Katartzis was the first to use the Greek word for nation Ethnos to describe a collective of clearly defined cultural and linguistic heritage. He stressed that a feeling of pride in the language is a reflection of a deeper pride in the nation." "The connection between 'national awakening' and language was elaborated" by him as "a representative of the Phanariots" "in 1780". "Katartzis argued that the Greeks satisfied Aristotle's definition of citizenship and that was a proof in their long historical genealogy. Katartzis was also concerned with the culture of the Vlachs and Moldavians and prescribed programs of cultural reforms, alike those he drafted for the Greeks."
