= Neophytos Doukas =

Greek priest and scholar

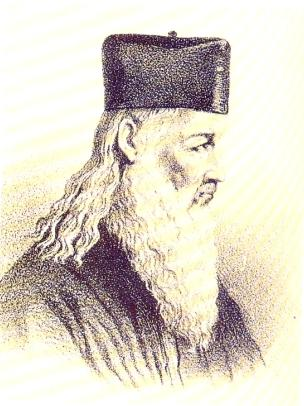
Neophytos Doukas

Neophytos Doukas or Dukas (Greek: Νεόφυτος Δούκας; 1760 – 1 January 1845) was a Greek priest and scholar, author of many books and translations from ancient Greek works, and one of the most important personalities of the modern Greek Enlightenment (Diafotismos) during the Ottoman occupation of Greece. His contributions to Greek education have been neglected because of the traditional ideas he advocated concerning the Greek language question (being an "archaist", supported the use of classical Greek over Katharevousa [puristic Greek] and Dimotiki).

== Life ==
Doukas was born in the village of Ano Soudena, in the mountainous Zagori region of Epirus, northwestern Greece. He has been described as of Greek or Aromanian descent. Nevertheless, he held negative views about Aromanians' culture and language, while he espoused notoriously pro-Greek views and he self-identified strictly as Greek. In one of the works that he would publish later in his life, Doukas called Aromanian a "filthy" and "stinking language" which he wanted to "eradicate any trace of" from Greek territory. On the other hand, declared that the Aromanians did a better work at preserving "Hellenic culture" than the Greeks themselves, this being because of their "dynamism" and "generosity".

As a child, Doukas lived inside a monastic community and became a priest when he reached adulthood. He started his studies in Ioannina and Metsovo and then continued in Bucharest, in Wallachia. His major interests were ancient Greek philosophy and literature as well as religious Greek and Latin documents.

At 1803 he moved to Vienna and became one of the most significant personalities of the Greek community there, in which he lived for 12 years. His career as a teacher started in 1812 in Bucharest, when he became director of the Eponym School (Greek: Επώνυμη Σχολή). In 1815, in a letter to the Patriarch of Constantinople Cyril VI, he urged for a “cultural crusade” to extend the boundaries of the Greek language and culture amongst the Bulgarians, the Vlachs and the Albanians, as well as in Asia Minor. His teaching methods were so popular that the number of his students increased rapidly in a 6 months period: from 60 to 400. His work was recognized by the Ecumenical Patriarch of Constantinople. In 1820 he became a member of the Filiki Eteria organization.

With the creation of the Greek independent state, he returned to Greece and undertook the administration of the orphanage of Egina, after being invited to do so by Governor Ioannis Kapodistrias. He made a donation of 11,000 books to the orphanage's library. In the same period, he became director of Rizarios Seminary (a religious institution of higher education) in Athens. He died in Athens before he could take up the duties of this position.

== Work ==
His significant educational and writing activity remained mostly unknown (until the late 20th century), mainly because of his conservative ideas and his promotion and use of the classical Greek language in education. He was accused by Adamantios Korais of being an "anti-philosopher". His contributions to Greek bibliography and to the Greek Enlightenment were, however, crucial.

Among many other works (over 70 books), he edited many ancient Greek authors, including Aristophanes, the Bibliotheca, Homer, Pindar, Euripides and Sophocles.

=== Works ===
- Ē kat' epitomēn grammatikē Terpsithea, 1812 (Anemi); 5th ed., 1832 (Anemi); 1833 (Anemi)
- Peri` tēs hellēnikes glōssēs [About the Greek language] ((Google))
