= Gheorghe Lazăr =

Romanian scholar

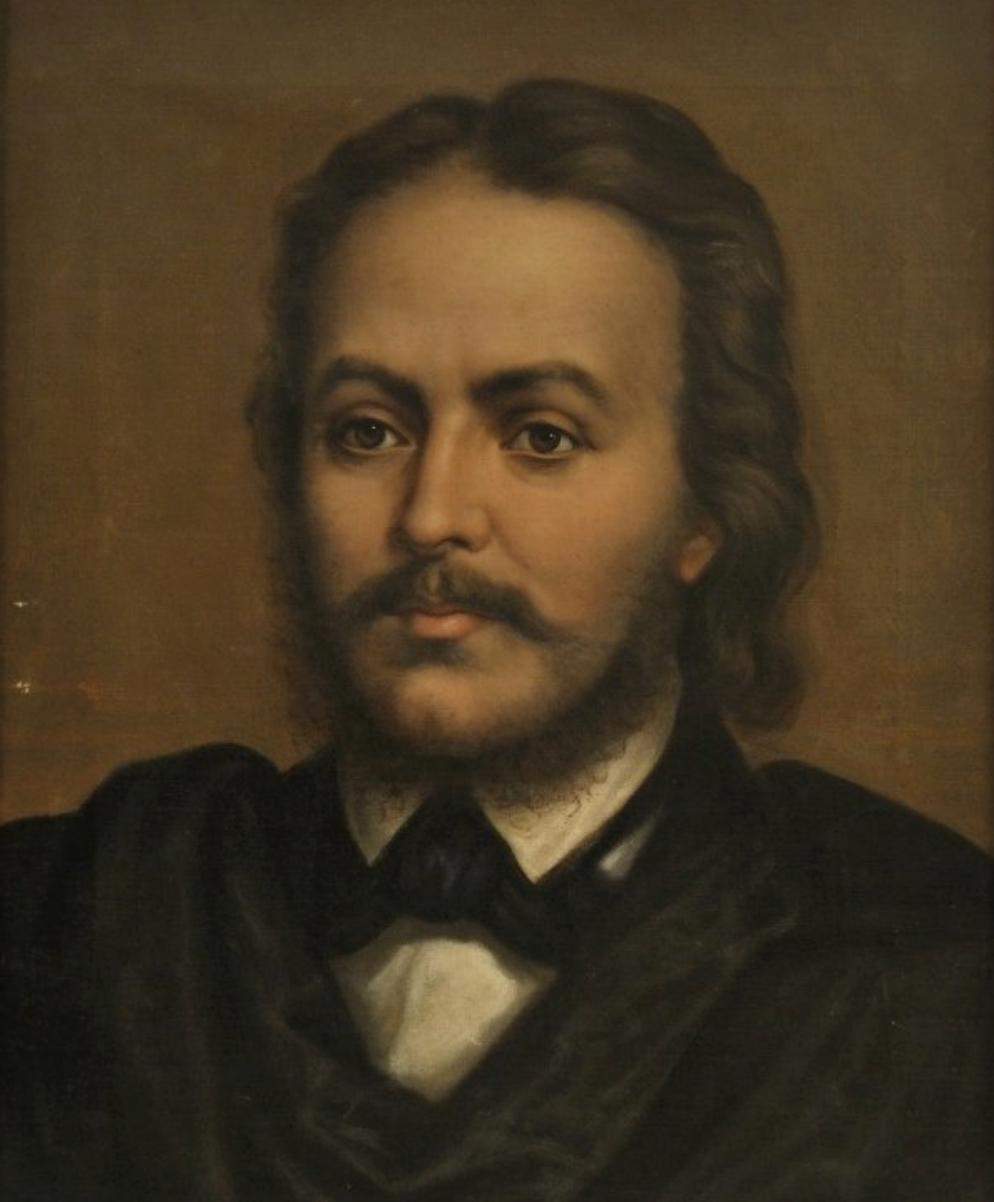

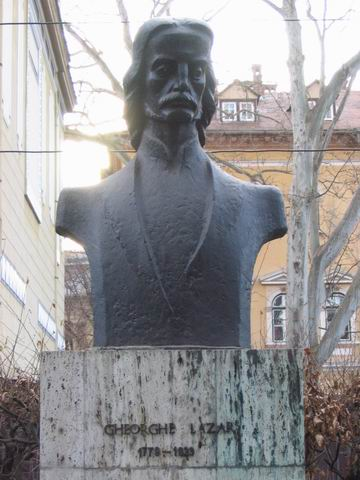
Lazăr's bust in front of the ASTRA Palace in Sibiu

Gheorghe Lazăr (5 June 1779 – 17 September 1823), was a Romanian scholar from Transylvania and the founder of the first Romanian language school in Bucharest, in 1817.

Lazăr was born in Felek, Szeben County, Hungary, later Avrig, Sibiu County, Romania. He studied in Nagyszeben (Sibiu), Kolozsvár (Cluj-Napoca), and Vienna, training in theology.

He died in 1821.

== Legacy ==
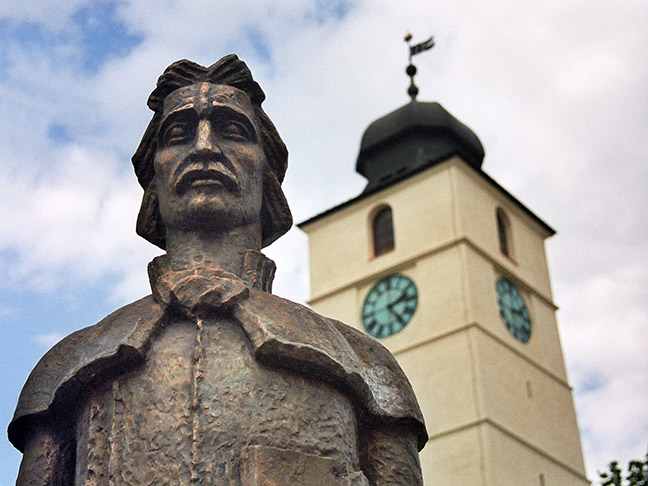
Lazăr's statue in the Grand Square, Sibiu

The Gheorghe Lazăr National College in Sibiu, which he attended in 1801–1802, is named for him, as is the Gheorghe Lazăr National College in Bucharest.

(Gheorghe Lazăr, a village in Ialomița County, is named also named for him.

A statue of him was erected in Bucharest's University Square, standing in front of the University of Bucharest.
