= Battle of Cernăuți (1497) =

1497 battle between Moldavia and Polish forces

- Part of the Moldavian campaign (1497–1499)
Date	30 October 1497
Location	Cernăuți, Moldavia
Result	Moldavian victory
Territorial changes	Remnants of the Polish forces retreat from Moldavia

Belligerents
Moldavia	Kingdom of Poland; Duchy of Masovia; Teutonic Order

Commanders and leaders
Stephen III; Sima Boldur	John I Albert; Stanisław Chodecki; Konrad III Rudy

Strength
Unknown	Unknown

Casualties and losses
Unknown	Very heavy

The Battle of Cernăuți took place during the Moldavian campaign of the Kingdom of Poland. The confrontation took place 30 October 1497, resulting in Moldavian victory and decimation of the large portion of the Polish forces.

== Prelude ==
On 29 October 1497, the Masovian Prince Konrad III Rudy sent out a force of 600 knights in attempt to relief the retreating forces of Polish King John I Albert. However, this force was decimated by Stephen's entrusted commander (Sima Boldur) at the Battle of Lențești. As a result, Albert continued his retreat, in hopes of getting out of Moldavia with his enact army.

== Battle ==
On 30 October, after retreating for three days, Polish King John I Albert with his army crossed the Prut river. The Polish army then marched to Pokuttia. However, the Moldavian forces there prepared an ambush on the Poles and their allies, taking advantage of the favourable environment. The Polish army were demoralised, with Moldavians giving them a passage for a prepared attack. Polish forces were subsequently caught by surprise, attacked by the Moldavian forces and suffered heavy losses. The remnants of Polish army desperately broke out. This was described as a "complete victory of Stefan Cel Mare over the Polish invaders".

== Aftermath ==
The Polish army was decimated. After the Polish King John I Albert reached Sniatyn on 2 November, the remnants of the Polish forces were left completely demoralised. Polish army suffered 11,000–40,000 casualties during the campaign, alongside nearly all Masovian and Teutonic Knights getting wiped out. The Lithuanian reinforcements were turned back from Moldavia by the Polish King, redirected towards defensive purposes.

On 14 November, Stephen order the construction of Ascension Church, Neamț Monastery. On 22 June 1498, Stephen would launch an invasion of Poland in order to avenge the Polish invasion of Moldavia in 1497.
