= Moldavian campaign in Poland =

1498 Moldavian invasion of Poland

- Part of the Moldavian campaign (1497–1499) and Polish–Ottoman War (1485–1503)
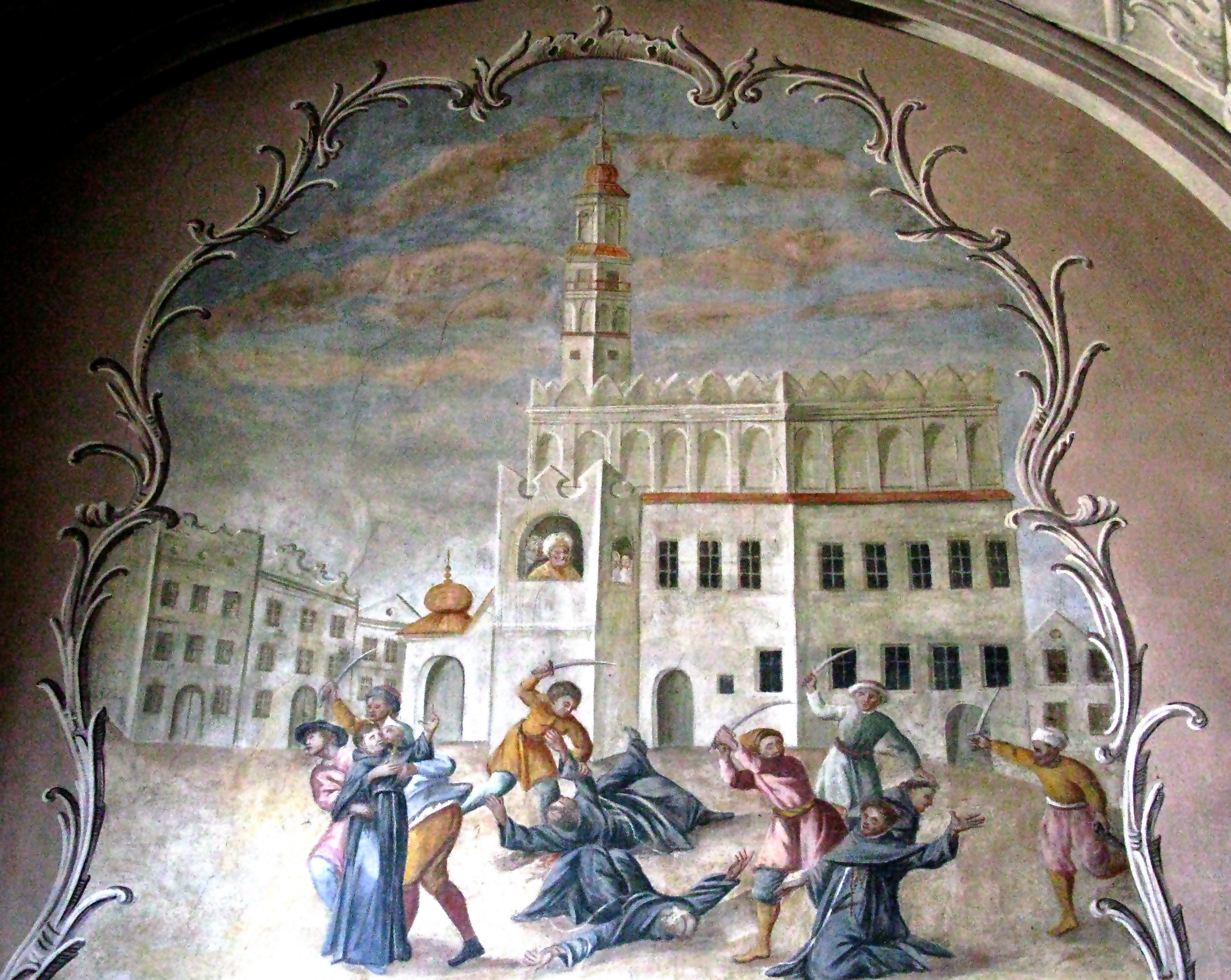
- The death of the Franciscans at the hands of Stephen III's soldiers in 1498
Date	June – July 1498
Location	Southern and eastern lands of Poland
Result	Moldavian victory

Belligerents
Moldavia; Ottoman Empire; Crimean Khanate	Kingdom of Poland

Commanders and leaders
Stephen III	John I Albert; Stanisław Chodecki

Strength
40,000	Unknown

Casualties and losses
Unknown	Many killed 100,000 enslaved

The Moldavian campaign in Poland was a retaliatory invasion launched by Moldavian Voivode Stephen the Great with support of the Ottoman Empire and Crimean Khanate against the Kingdom of Poland. It took place from June to July 1498, resulting in Moldavian victory and devastation of the southeastern Polish lands.

== Prelude ==
After an unsuccessful Polish invasion of Moldavia and their defeat at the Battle of Cosmin Forest in 1497, Stephen the Great sought to take revenge by launching his own campaign into the lands of the Kingdom of Poland. The invasion force numbered 40,000 troops. Ottoman Turks and Crimean Tatars were also to take part in the campaign.

== Campaign ==
The Ottoman forces attacked in June, with Moldavians attacking on 22 June or July. Red Ruthenia and Podolia were devastated by the Ottoman and Moldavian forces, with numerous people driven off to slavery in process.

Moldavian forces sacked Trembowla, Buczacz and Podhajce after capturing these cities. Stephen's army ravaged the lands up to Lwów and over the Dniester, particularly Pokucie. Przemyśl, Radymno, Jarosław, Kańczuga, Łańcut and several other Polish cities were also devastated by Moldavians. Polish King John I Albert called on the Polish army and szlachta (nobility) to gather at Sandomierz, in order to repel the Moldavian invasion. However, the Moldavian army returned with loot and slaves to their capital Suceava by the time Polish forces finished mobilising.

== Aftermath ==
The Moldavian campaign in Poland led to devastation of its southeastern lands and enormous loss of life, with up to 100,000 Polish slaves taken by Moldavians. The war ended favorably for Moldavia and the Ottoman Empire. A peace treaty between Moldavia and Poland was concluded on 16 April 1499, under mediation of the Kingdom of Hungary.
