= Battle of Lențești =

1497 battle between Moldavia and Mazovia

- Part of the Moldavian campaign (1497–1499)
Date	29 October 1497
Location	Lențești, Moldavia
Result	Moldavian victory

Belligerents
Moldavia	Duchy of Masovia

Commanders and leaders
Stephen III; Sima Boldur	Konrad III Rudy

Strength
3,000–5,000	600 knights

Casualties and losses
Light	All knights killed

The Battle of Lenţeşti took place during the Moldavian campaign of the Kingdom of Poland. The confrontation took place between the 600 Masovian Knights of Konrad III Rudy and 3,000–5,000 Moldavian horsemen of general Sima Boldur, who was entrusted by Stephen the Great. The battle took place on 29 October 1497, resulting in Moldavian victory.

== Prelude ==
After the devastating defeat of the Kingdom of Poland and Teutonic Order at the Battle of Cosmin Forest, remnants of the Polish forces begun to retreat out of Moldavia, while facing constant attacks from Moldavians. Konrad III Rudy of Duchy of Masovia sent out a detachment of 600 Masovian Knights, in attempt to relief Polish King John I Albert. However, they would end up confronting a force of 3,000–5,000 Moldavian horsemen from Stephen the Great's army, with Stephen entrusting Sima Boldur to lead the battle.

== Battle ==
Due to increasingly deterring health of Stephen the Great, he entrusted Sima Boldur to command the army of 3,000–5,000 horsemen. The decision to hand military leadership over to Boldur was described by historian Ștefan S. Gorovei as "a very exceptional case, the only one known as such in the history of medieval Moldavia".

The fighting took place on at Lențești, near modern-day Chernivtsi. The Masovian Knights were surrounded and completely annihilated. According to the Slavo-Moldavian chronicle, this was the course of the battle that resulted in Moldavian victory and decimation of the Masovians: "On Sunday, October 29, they defeated that army, by the mercy of God and with the luck of Prince Stephen. And there was also a great slaughter there that day among the Lesians by the Moldavian weapons and a lot of the Lesian army fell there too, in the place called the village of Lențeștii".

== Aftermath ==
The battle resulted in Moldavian victory and destruction of the Masovian Knight detachment. Polish King John I Albert was forced to continue his retreat, which lasted three days from 26 October after his defeat at the Battle of Cosmin Forest. However, on 30 October, the Polish army was ambushed by Moldavians, leading to the Battle of Cernăuți and suffering further losses. The Hustyn Chronicle emphasised the immense scale of losses suffered by Poles during their disastrous Moldavian campaign: "in the time of King Albert, the szlachta perished in Poland".
