= Battle of Kopystrzyń (1487) =

1487 battle in Podolia, modern Ukraine

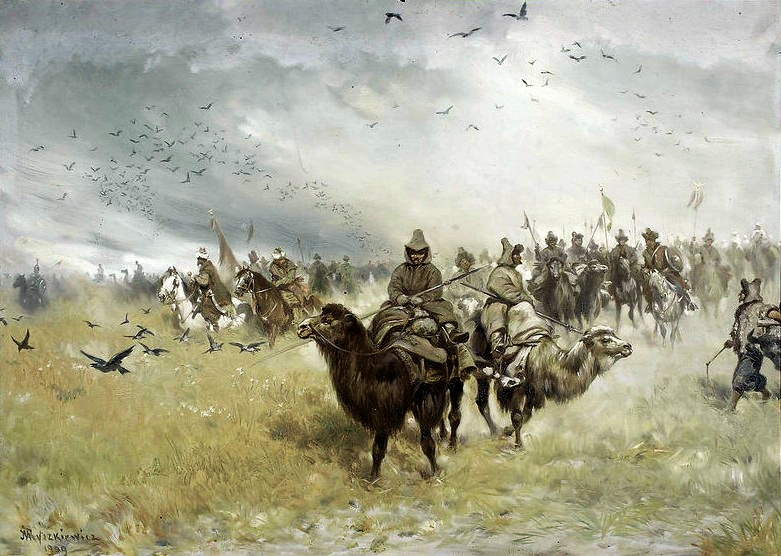
- The Tatar chambuls by Józef Ryszkiewicz
Date	8 September 1487
Location	Kopystyryn, Podolia, (now part of Ukraine)
Result	Polish victory

Belligerents
Kingdom of Poland	Crimean Khanate

Commanders and leaders
John I Albert	Unknown

Strength
Unknown	5,000

Casualties and losses
Unknown	2,000 dead or captured

The Battle of Kopystrzyń took place on September 8, 1487 near Kopystrzyń in Podolia. The Polish army, led by Prince John I Albert, defeated a 5000-strong Tatar Chambul dispatched by the Ottomans against the Crown. About 1,500 Tatars were killed, and many more were taken prisoner.

== Prelude ==
In 1485, the Ottoman Empire seized the ports of Chilia and Cetatea Albă, which belonged to Moldavia. The Moldavian Hospodar Stephen the Great who was a Polish vassal asked the Polish king for help. King Casimir IV Jagiellon assembled an army and set out for the Moldavian border. The combined Polish-Moldavian army set off after the enemy having reached Chilia they defeated the Ottoman army in battle. However, the Ottoman Sultan did not want to give up Moldavia and already in 1487 sent a Tatar chambul of 5,000 men towards the Polish border.

The Polish army was led by Prince John I Albert.

== The battle ==
Having crushed the Tatars, Albert retreated back to Kopystrzyń. There, meanwhile, a second, smaller Tatar detachment had already arrived. The Tatars realized the weakness of the Polish guard and seized the camp without difficulty. Convinced that the Poles had escaped, they divided their prey among themselves and began to enjoy the liquor they found in the tents. At this point Olbracht arrived with his army and unexpectedly struck at the feasting enemy from the march. Nearly 2,000 Tatars fell or were taken prisoner.

== Aftermath ==
After the battle, on the orders of John I Albert, the leader of the Tatars was captured and beheaded.
