= Iosafat Snagoveanu =

Wallachian revolutionary (1797–1872)

Iosafat Snagoveanu (Romanian pronunciation: [josaˈfat snaɡoˈve̯anu]; also credited as Ioasaf Znagoveanu, born Ion Vărbileanu [iˈon vərbiˈle̯anu]; April 22, 1797–November 3, 1872) was a Wallachian revolutionary and monk of the Romanian Orthodox Church.

Born in Prahova County, in a village on the Vărbilău River valley, he was educated at the seminary of the Buzău Diocese. He was ordained a priest in 1829, assigned to Slănic parish, and soon made archpriest of Mizil. Left a widower, he entered a monastery under the name Iosafat, and for a time was an administrator at the Buzău Diocese. Iosafat resumed his education at Saint Sava College in Bucharest, and served as a priest at the Saint Sava Monastery, then at Curtea Veche. After finishing school, he was named professor at Saint Sava. From April 1844 to November 1848, he was hegumen of Snagov Monastery, from which he took his name.

Iosafat was an active participant in the Wallachian Revolution of 1848, serving on a commission for freeing the Roma slaves. As a result, he was forced to flee, first to Transylvania and then to Dobruja, where Metropolitan Dionisie of Proilavia ordained him archimandrite. Iosafat ultimately settled in Paris, where he organized the Romanian community around a chapel at 22 rue Racine. The building was blessed in 1855, and he served there until his death. He was buried in the parochial crypt at Montparnasse Cemetery.
