= Slavery in Romania =

Chattel slavery existed on the territory of present-day Romania from the founding of the principalities of Wallachia and Moldavia in 13th–14th century, until it was abolished in stages during the 1840s and 1850s before the Romanian War of Independence and the formation of the United Principalities of Moldavia and Wallachia in 1859, and also until 1783 in Transylvania and Bucovina (parts of the Habsburg monarchy). Most of the slaves were of Romani ethnicity. Particularly in Moldavia there were also slaves of Tatar ethnicity, probably prisoners captured from the wars with the Nogai and Crimean Tatars. During the invasion of Poland by Stephen the Great, Moldavians took 100,000 Polish slaves.

Romani slaves belonged to boyars (aristocrats), Orthodox monasteries, or the state. They were used as blacksmiths, goldsmiths and agricultural workers, but when the principalities were urbanized, they also served as servants.

The abolition of slavery was achieved at the end of a campaign by young revolutionaries influenced by the ideas of the Enlightenment. Mihail Kogălniceanu, who drafted the legislation on the abolition of slavery in Moldova, remains the name associated with the abolition. In 1843, the Wallachian state freed its slaves, and in 1856, in both principalities, slaves of all classes were freed. Many formerly enslaved Romani people in Romania went to the United States and became the Romani Americans.

After the abolition, there were attempts (both by the state and by private individuals) to settle the nomads and to integrate the Roma into Romanian society, but their success was limited.

== Origins ==
The exact origins of slavery in the Danubian Principalities are not known. Historian Nicolae Iorga associated the Roma people's arrival with the 1241 Mongol invasion of Europe and through the Crimean–Nogai slave raids in Eastern Europe, taking the Roma from the Mongols as slaves and preserving their status. Other historians consider that they were enslaved while captured during the battles with the Tatars. The practice of enslaving prisoners may also have been taken from the Mongols. The ethnic identity of the "Tatar slaves" is unknown, they could have been captured Tatars of the Golden Horde, Cumans, or the slaves of Tatars and Cumans.

While it is possible that some Romani people were slaves or auxiliary troops of the Mongols or Tatars, the bulk of them came from south of the Danube at the end of the 14th century, some time after the founding of Wallachia. By then, the institution of slavery was already established in Moldavia, at the time enslaving the rumâni, but the arrival of the Roma made slavery a widespread practice. The Tatar slaves, smaller in numbers, were eventually merged into the Roma population.

Roma historian Viorel Achim also explained that "slavery was not a phenomenon characteristic only of Wallachia and Moldavia. In the Middle Ages there were slaves in neighboring countries: the Byzantine Empire, and in the Ottoman Empire, and in the Slavic countries south of the Danube. Moreover, slavery in our country is older than the arrival of gypsies. It is known about Tatar slaves, for example, who are older than Gypsy slaves, and for a time there were two well-defined categories even from a legal point of view: Tatar slaves, Gypsy slaves. But there were also Romanians who had the status of slaves."

Slavery was a common practice in Eastern Europe at the time (see Slavery in medieval Europe). Non-Christians in particular were taken as slaves in Christian Europe: in the Kingdom of Hungary, Saracens (Muslims) and Jewish Khazars were held as slaves until they were forced to convert to Christianity in the 13th century; Russians enslaved the prisoners captured from the Tatars (see Kholop), but their status eventually merged with that of the serfs.

From the late middle ages and during the early modern period, Christians from Eastern Europe were enslaved by the Nogai Horde, the Crimean Tatar Khanate and the Ottoman Empire for slavery in the Ottoman Empire and the Islamic Middle East.

There is some debate over whether the Romani people came to Wallachia and Moldavia as slaves or not. In the Byzantine Empire, they were slaves of the state in Bulgaria and Serbia until their social organization was destroyed by the Ottoman conquest, which would suggest that they came as slaves who had a change of "ownership". The alternative explanation, proposed by Romanian scholar P. P. Panaitescu, was that following the Crusades, an important east–west trade route passed through the Romanian states and the local feudal lords enslaved the Roma for economic gain for lack of other craftsmen. However, this theory is undermined by the fact that slavery was present before the trade route gained importance.

A legend tells that the Roma came to the Romanian Principalities at the invitation of Moldavian ruler Alexander the Good, who granted in a 1417 charter "land and air to live, and fire and iron to work", but the earliest reference to it is found in Mihail Kogălniceanu's writings and no charter was ever found.

Historian Djuvara argues forward hypotheses concerning the origin of the Romanians, such as advancing the theory that the vast majority of the nobility in the medieval states that made up the territory of modern-day Romania was of Cuman origin and not Romanian: "Romanians were called the black cumans".

The very first document attesting the presence of Roma people in Wallachia dates back to 1385, and refers to the group as aţigani (from athinganoi, a Greek-language word for "heretics", and the origin of the Romanian term ţigani, which is synonymous with "Gypsy"). The document, signed by Prince Dan I, assigned 40 sălaşe (hamlets or dwellings) of aţigani to Tismana Monastery, the first of such grants to be recorded. In Moldavia, the institution of slavery was attested to for the first time in a 1470 Moldavian document, through which Moldavian Prince Stephan the Great frees Oană, a Tatar slave who had fled to Jagiellon Poland.

Anthropologist Sam Beck argues that the origins of Roma slavery can be most easily explained in the practice of taking prisoners of war as slaves, a Mongol practice with a long history in the region, and that, initially, free and enslaved Roma coexisted on what became Romanian territory.

There are some accounts according to which some of the Roma slaves had been captured during wars. For instance, in 1445, Vlad Dracul took by force from Bulgaria to Wallachia around 11,000–12,000 people "who looked like Egyptians", presumably Roma. In 1471, the Moldavian army of Stephen the Great defeated the army of Radu III and plundered Wallachia, including taking 17,000 Romani slaves with them.

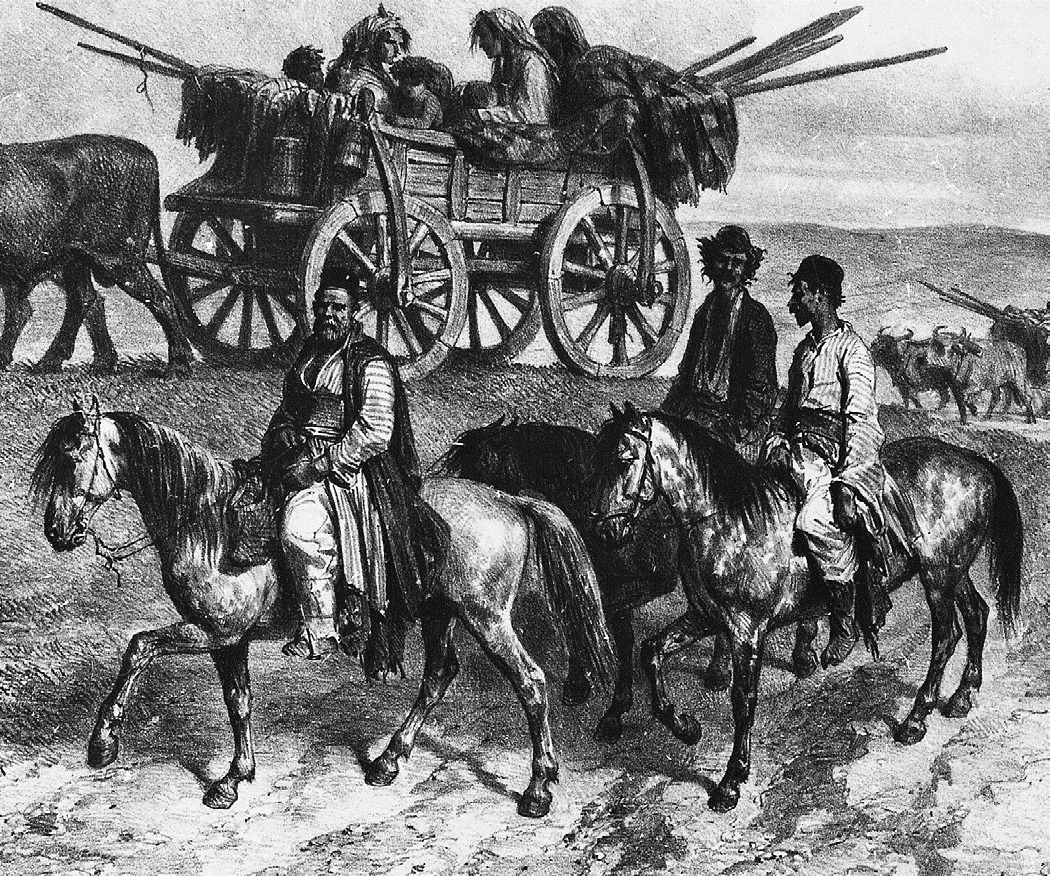
Nomadic Roma family traveling in Moldavia, Auguste Raffet, 1837

== Condition of the slaves ==
=== General characteristics and slave categories ===
The Danubian Principalities were for most of their history the only territory in Eastern and Central Europe where Roma slavery was legislated, and the place where this was most extended. As a consequence of this, British sociologist Will Guy describes Romania as a "unique case", and one of the fort main "patterns of development" in what concerns the Roma groups of the region (alongside those present in countries that have in the recent past belonged to the Ottomans, Austria-Hungary and the Russian Empire).

Traditionally, Roma slaves were divided into three categories. The smallest was owned by the hospodars, and went by the Romanian-language name of țigani domnești ("Gypsies belonging to the lord"). The two other categories comprised țigani mănăstirești ("Gypsies belonging to the monasteries"), who were the property of Romanian Orthodox and Greek Orthodox monasteries, and țigani boierești ("Gypsies belonging to the boyars"), who were enslaved by landowners. The status of the țigani domneşti was better than that of the slaves held by boyars or the monasteries and many slaves given by the Prince to private owners or to monasteries ran away and joined the communities of the Prince's slaves.

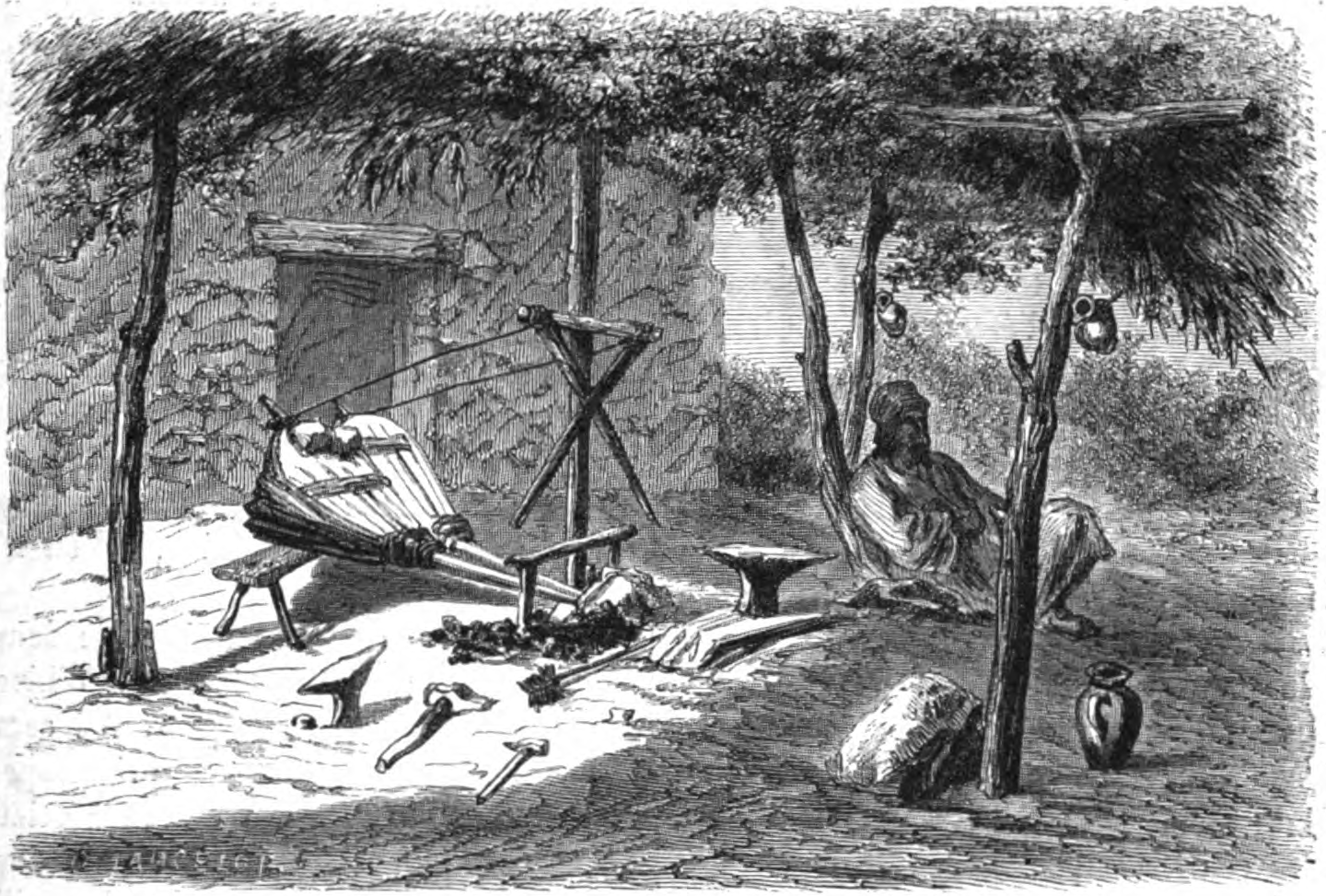
A Roma smith and his forge in Wallachia, Dieudonné Lancelot, 1860

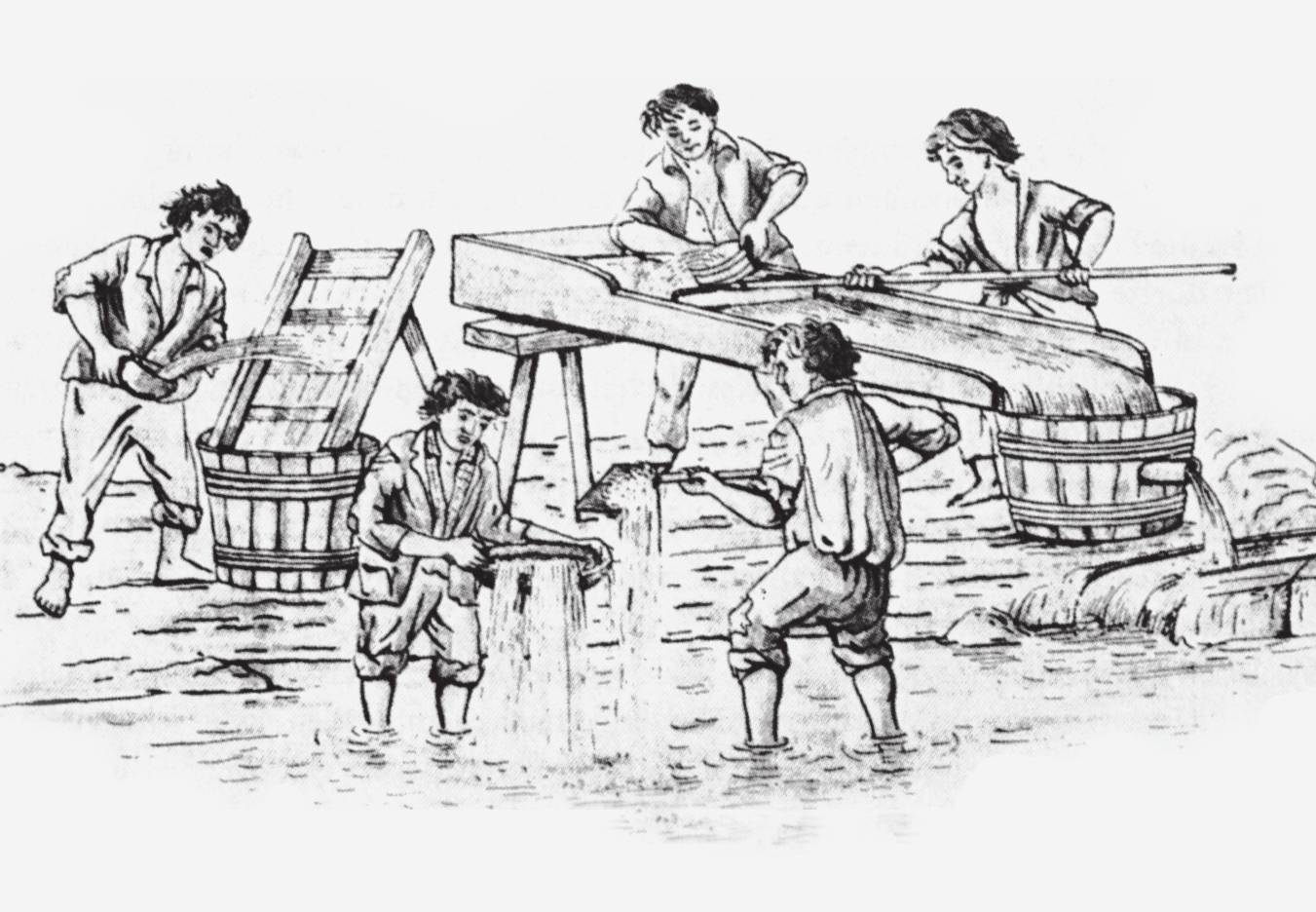
Roma gold miners (Boyash, Aurari, Zlătari or Rudari) at work, gold panning

Each of the slave categories was divided into two groups: vătrași and lăieși; the former was a sedentary category, while the latter was allowed to preserve its nomadism. The lăieși category comprised several occupational subgroups: alongside the Kalderash căldărari or "copper workers"), Lăutari ("string instrument players"), Boyash (lingurari or "spoon makers") and Ursari ("bear handlers"), all of which developed as distinct ethnic subgroups, they comprised the fierari ("smiths"). For a long period of time, the Roma were the only smiths and ironmongers in Wallachia and Moldavia. Among the fierari, the more valued were the specialized potcovari ("farriers"). Women owned by the boyars were often employed as housemaids in service to the boyaresses, and both them and some of the enslaved men could be assigned administrative tasks within the manor. From early on in the history of slavery in Romania, many other slaves were made to work in the salt mines.

Another category was the Aurari or Rudari (gold miners), who were slaves of the Prince who panned for gold during the warm season in the mountain rivers of the Carpathians, while staying in the plains during the winter, carving wooden utensils. The gold miners, through their yield of gold, brought much more income to the treasury than the other types of slaves and initially they were in large numbers, but as the deposits became exhausted, their number dropped. By 1810, there were only 400 Aurari panning for gold in Wallachia.

During the 14th and 15th centuries very few slaves were found in the cities. Only since the beginning of the 16th century, monasteries began opening in the cities and they brought with them the Roma slaves and soon boyars and even townfolks began to use them for various tasks. The sălașe of Roma slaves were settled in the outskirts, and soon, almost all cities had such a district, with the largest being in the largest cities, including Târgoviște, Râmnic or Bucharest.

Medieval society allowed a certain degree of social mobility, as attested by the career of Ștefan Răzvan, a Wallachian Roma slave who was able to rise to the rank of boyar, was sent on official duty to the Ottoman Empire, and, after allying himself with the Poles and Cossack groups, became Moldavian Prince (April–August 1595).

=== Status and obligations ===
The Roma were considered personal property of the boyar, who was allowed to put them to work, selling them or exchanging them for other goods and the possessions of the slaves were also at the discretion of the master, this form of slavery distinguishing itself from the rumâni, who could only be sold together with the land. The boyar was allowed to punish his slaves physically, through beatings or imprisonment, but he or she did not have power of life and death over them, the only obligation of the master being to clothe and feed the slaves who worked at his manor.

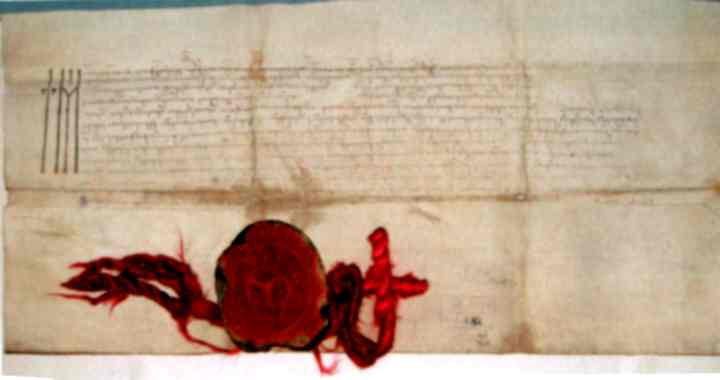
A deed of donation through which Stephen III of Moldavia donates a number of sălașe of Roma slaves to the Rădăuţi bishopric

The social prestige of a slave master was often proportional to the number and kinds of skilled slaves in his possession, outstanding cooks and embroiderers being used to symbolically demonstrate the high status of the boyar families. Good musicians, embroiderers or cooks were prized and fetched higher prices: for instance, in the first half of the 18th century, a regular slave was valued at around 20–30 lei, a cook would be 40 lei.

However, Djuvara, who bases his argument on a number of contemporary sources, also notes that the slaves were exceptionally cheap by any standard: in 1832, a contract involving the dowry of a boyaress shows that thirty Roma slaves were exchanged for one carriage, while the British diplomat William Wilkinson noted that the slave trade was a semi-clandestine matter, and that vătrași slaves could fetch the modest sum of five or six hundred Turkish kuruş. According to Djuvara's estimate, lăieși could be worth only half the sum attested by Wilkinson.

In the Principalities, the slaves were governed by common law. By the 17th century, the earliest written laws to mention slavery appeared. The Wallachian Pravila de la Govora (1640) and Pravila lui Matei Basarab (1652) and the Moldavian Carte Românească de Învățătură (1646), which, among other things, regulated slavery, were based on the Byzantine law on slavery and on the common law then in use. However, customary law (obiceiul pământului) was almost always used in practice.

If a slave owned property, one would have to pay the same taxes as the free men. Usually, there was no tax on privately owned slaves, excepting for a short period in Moldavia: between 1711 and 1714, Phanariote Prince Nicholas Mavrocordatos introduced the țigănit ("Gypsy tax"), a tax of two galbeni (standard gold coins) on each slave owned. It was not unusual for both boyars and monasteries to register their serfs as "Gypsies" so that they would not pay the taxes that were imposed on the serfs.

The domnești slaves (some of whom were itinerant artisans), would have to pay a yearly tax named dajdie. Similarly, boyar-owned lăieși were required to gather at their master's household once a year, usually on the autumn feast of Saint Demetrius (presently coinciding with the October 26 celebrations in the Orthodox calendar). On the occasion, each individual over the age of 15 was required to pay a sum of between thirty and forty piastres.

A slaveowner had the power to free his slaves for good service, either during his lifetime or in his will, but these cases were rather rare. The other way around also happened: free Roma sold themselves to monasteries or boyars in order to make a living.

=== Legal disputes and disruption of the traditional lifestyles ===
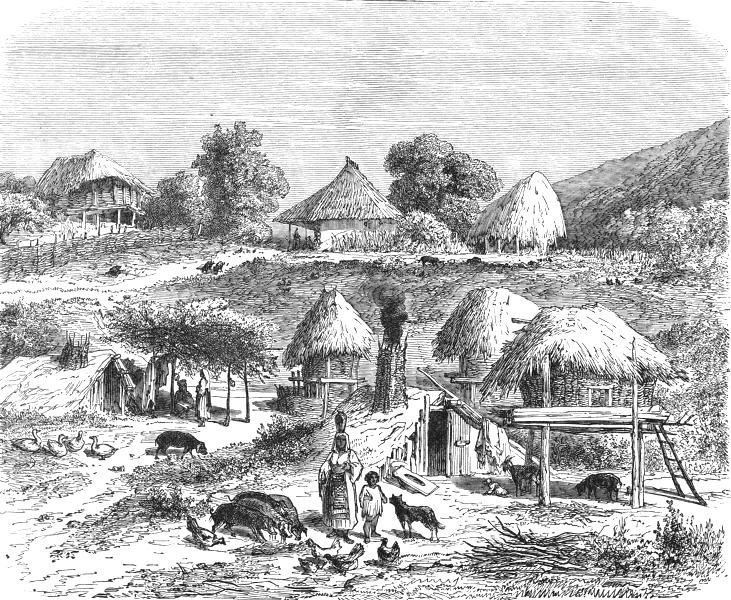
A shatra (village) founded by Roma slaves, as depicted in an 1860 engraving by Dieudonné Lancelot

Initially, and down to the 15th century, Roma and Tatar slaves were all grouped into self-administrating sălaşe (Old Church Slavonic: челѣдь, čelyad') which were variously described by historians as being an extended family, a household or even a community. Their leaders, themselves slaves, were known as cneji, juzi or vătămani, and, in addition to sorting legal disputes, collected taxes and organised labour for the owners. With time, disputes between two Roma slaves were usually dealt by the community leaders, who became known as bulibaşi. Occasionally, the larger slave communities elected themselves a başbulibaşa, who was superior to the bulibaşi and charged with solving the more divisive or complicated conflicts within the respective group. The system went unregulated, often leading to violent conflicts between slaves, which, in one such case attested for the 19th century, led to boyar intervention and the foot whipping of those deemed guilty of insubordination.

The disputes with non-slaves and the manslaughter cases were dealt by the state judiciary system. Slaves were not allowed to defend themselves or bear witness in front of a court, but they were also not responsible to damage done to free men, the owner being accountable for any such damages, the compensation being sometimes the renunciation of the ownership of the slave to the other party. A slave who killed another slave was sentenced to death, but they could also be given to the owner of the dead slave. A freeman killing a slave was also liable for death penalty and a boyar was not allowed to kill his own slaves, but no such sentencing is attested. It is, however, believed that such killings did occur in significant numbers.

The Orthodox Church (Ecumenical Patriarchate of Constantinople), itself a major slaveholder, did not contest the institution of slavery, although among the early advocates of the abolition was Eufrosin Poteca, a priest. Occasionally, members of the church hierarchy intervened to limit abuse against slaves it did not own: Wallachian Metropolitan Dositei demanded from Prince Constantine Ypsilantis to discourage his servants from harassing a young Roma girl named Domniţa. The young woman was referred to as one of the domneşti slaves, although she had been freed by that moment.

Like many of the serfs in the two principalities, slaves were prone to escape from the estates and seek a better life on other domains or abroad, which made boyars organize search parties and make efforts to have them return. Fugitive slaves would settle abroad in Hungary, Poland, lands of the Cossacks, the Ottoman Empire, Serbia, or from Moldavia to Wallachia and the other way around. The administrations of the two states supported the search and return of fugitive slaves to their masters. Occasionally, the hospodars organized expeditions abroad in order to find runaways, or through diplomacy, they appealed to the rulers of the lands where the runaways settled. For instance, in 1570, logofăt Drăgan was sent by Bogdan IV of Moldavia to the King of Poland to ask for the return of 13 sălaşe of slaves.

In the 16th century, the duties of collecting wartime tithes and of retrieving runaways were performed by a category called globnici, many of whom were also slaves. Beginning in the 17th century, much of the Kalderash population left the region to settle south into the Balkans, and later also moved into other regions of Europe.

A small section of the native Roma population managed to evade the system (either by not having been originally enslaved as a group, or by regrouping runaway slaves). They lived in isolation on the margin of society, and tended to settle in places where access was a problem. They were known to locals as netoţi (lit. "incomplete ones", a dismissive term generally used to designate people with mental disorders or who display poor judgment). Around 1830, they became the target of regular manhunts, those captured being turned into ţigani domneşti.

A particular problem regarded the vătraşi, whose lifestyle was heavily disrupted by forced settlement and the requirement that they perform menial labour. Traditionally, this category made efforts to avoid agricultural work in service of their masters. Djuvara argues that this was because their economic patterns were at a hunter-gatherer stage. Christine Reinhard, an early 19th-century intellectual and wife of French diplomat Charles-Frédéric Reinhard, recorded that, in 1806, a member of the Moldavian Sturdza family employed a group of vătraşi at his factory. The project was reputedly abandoned after Sturdza realised he was inflicting intense suffering on his employees.

Roma artisans were occasionally allowed to practice their trade outside the boyar household, in exchange for their own revenue. This was the case of Lăutari, who were routinely present at fairs and in public houses as independent tarafs. Slaves could own a number of bovines, but part of their other forms of revenue was collected by the master. In parallel, the lăieşi are believed to have often resorted to stealing the property of peasants. According to Djuvara, Roma housemaids were often spared hard work, especially in cases where the number of slaves per household ensured a fairer division of labour.

=== Marriage regulations ===
Marriage between two slaves was only allowed with the approval of the two owners, usually through a financial agreement which resulted in the selling of one slave to the other owner or through an exchange. When no agreement was reached, the couple was split and the children resulting from the marriage were divided between the two slaveholders. Slave owners kept strict records of their lăieşi slaves, and, according to Djuvara, were particularly anxious because the parents of slave children could sell their offspring to other masters.

The slaveowners separated Roma couples when selling one of the spouses. This practice was banned by Constantine Mavrocordatos in 1763 and discouraged by the Orthodox Church, which decreed in 1766 that "although they are called gypsies [i.e. slaves], the Lord created them and it is indecent to separate them like cattle". Nevertheless, splitting married spouses was still common in the 19th century.

Marriage between a free person and a slave was initially possible only by the free person becoming a slave, although later on, it was possible for a free person to keep one's social status and that the children resulting from the marriage to be free people.

During several periods in history, this kind of intercourse was explicitly forbidden:

In Moldavia, in 1774, prince Alexander Mourousis banned marriages between free people and slaves. A similar chrysobull was decreed by Alexandru Mavrocordat Firaris in 1785, which not only banned such marriages, but invalidated any such existing marriage.

In Wallachia, Alexander Ypsilantis (1774–1782) banned mixed marriages in his law code, but the children resulting from such marriages were to be born free. In 1804, Constantine Ypsilantis ordered the forceful divorce of one such couple, and issued an order to have priests sealing this type of unions to be punished by their superiors.

Marital relations between Roma people and the majority ethnic Romanian population were rare, due to the difference in status and, as Djuvara notes, to an emerging form of racial prejudice. Nevertheless, extra-marital relationships between male slave owners and female slaves, as well as the rape of Roma women by their owners, were widespread, and the illegitimate children were themselves kept as slaves on the estate.

== Transylvania, Bukovina and Bessarabia ==
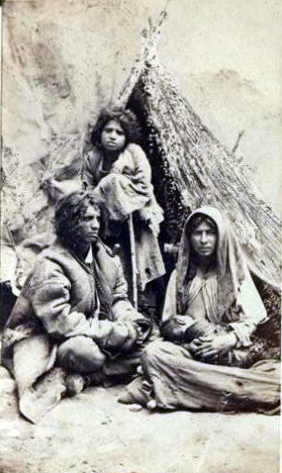
A Roma family, Sibiu, Transylvania, c. 1862, photo by Theodor Glatz

The slavery of the Roma in bordering Transylvania was found especially in the fiefs and areas under the influence of Wallachia and Moldavia, these areas keeping their practice of slavery even after they were no longer under Wallachian or Moldavian possession. The earliest record of Roma in Transylvania is from around 1400, when a boyar was recorded of owning 17 dwellings of Roma in Făgăraş, an area belong to Wallachia at the time. The social organization of Făgăraş was the same as in Wallachia, the Roma slaves being the slaves of boyars, the institution of slavery being kept in the Voivodate of Transylvania within the Kingdom of Hungary and in the autonomous Principality of Transylvania, being only abolished with the beginning of the Habsburg domination in the 18th century. For instance, in 1556, Hungarian Queen Isabella Jagiełło confirmed the possessions of some Recea boyars, which included Roma slaves. The deed was also confirmed in 1689 by Prince Michael I Apafi.

The estates belonging to the Bran Castle also held a large number of slaves, around 1500 at the beginning of the 16th century, the right of being a slaveholder being probably inherited from the time that the castle was owned by Wallachia. Areas under the influence of Moldavia also held slaves: for instance, it is known that Moldavian Prince Petru Rareş bought a family of Roma from the mayor of Bistriţa and that other boyars also bought slaves from Transylvania. However, only a minority of the Transylvanian Roma were slaves, most of them being "royal serfs", under the direct authority of the King, being only required to pay certain taxes and perform some services for the state, some groups of Roma being given the permission to travel freely throughout the country.

In 1775, Bukovina, the scene of the 1821 incidents, was annexed from Moldavia by the Habsburgs, and inherited the practice of slavery, especially since the many monasteries in the region held a large number of Roma slaves. The number of Roma living in Bukovina was estimated in 1775 at 800 families, or 4.6% of the population. Joseph II, Holy Roman Emperor issued an order abolishing slavery on June 19, 1783, in Czernowitz, similar to other orders given throughout the Empire against slavery (see Josephinism). The order met the opposition of the large slaveholders: the Romanian Orthodox monasteries and the boyars. The boyars loudly pleaded their case to the authorities of Bukovina and Galicia, arguing that the banning of slavery was a transgression against the autonomy and traditions of the province, that bondage is the appropriate state for the Roma and that it was for their own good. It took a few more years until the order was fully implemented, but toward the end of the 1780s, the slaves officially joined the ranks of the landless peasantry. Many of the "new peasants" (as they were called in some documents) remained to work for the estates for which they were slaves, the liberation bringing little immediate change in their life.

After the eastern half of Moldavia, known as Bessarabia, was annexed by the Russian Empire in 1812 and later set up as a Bessarabia Governorate, the slave status for the Roma was kept. Slavery was legislated in the "Establishment of the organisation of the province of Bessarabia" act of 1818, by which the Roma were a social category divided into state slaves and private slaves, which belonged to boyars, clergy or traders. The Empire's authorities tried the sedentize the nomadic state slaves by turning them into serfs of the state. Two villages were created in Southern Bessarabia, Cair and Faraonovca (now both in Ukraine) by settling 752 Roma families. However, things did not go as expected, the state of the villages "sank to deplorable levels" and their inhabitants refused to pay any taxes. According to the 1858 census, in Bessarabia, there were 11,074 Roma slaves, of which 5,615 belonged to the state and 5,459 to the boyars. Slavery, together with serfdom, was only abolished by the emancipation laws of 1861. As a consequence, the slaves became peasants, continuing to work for their former masters or joining the nomadic Roma craftsmen and musicians.

== Estimates for the slave population ==
The Roma slaves were not included in the tax censuses and as such, there are no reliable statistics about them, the exception being the slaves owned by the state. Nevertheless, there were several 19th-century estimates. According to Djuvara, the estimates for the slave population tended to gravitate around 150,000–200,000 persons, which he notes was equivalent to 10% of the two countries' population. At the time of the abolition of slavery, in the two principalities there were between 200,000 and 250,000 Roma, representing 7% of the total population.

Year	Source	Moldavia	Wallachia
1819	Dionisie Fotino	–	120,000
1837	Mihail Kogălniceanu	200,000	
1838	Félix Colson	139,255	119,910
1844	Ferdinand Neigebaur	–	180,000
1849	Paul Bataillard	250,000	
1857	Jean Alexandre Vaillant	137,000	125,000
1857	Jean Henri Abdolonyme Ubicini	100,000	150,000
1859	census (emancipated slaves)	250,000	

== Monastic Slavery: Legislative Framework, Corporal Punishment, and Dehumanization ==
Recent historiography, through the works of researchers such as Petre Petcuț, Viorel Achim, and Adrian-Nicolae Furtună, has fundamentally re-evaluated the role of the Orthodox Church in the institution of slavery. These studies highlight that monasteries functioned not only as places of worship but as major economic units where labor discipline (of the Roma slaves, known as robi) was maintained through a severe carceral regime. Analysis of archival documents demonstrates that the use of torture and physical punishment was not an isolated practice, but one regulated and legitimized by high-ranking hierarchs.

=== The Legislative Framework and Antim Ivireanul's Involvement ===
A pivotal moment in the codification of this repressive regime is represented by the activity of Metropolitan Antim Ivireanul. Historian Petre Petcuț provides a detailed analysis of the "Charter of the All Saints Monastery" (Așezământul Mănăstirii Toți Sfinții, drafted between 1713–1715), a foundational document for monastic organization written by the Metropolitan himself.

Beyond his image as a martyr and scholar, Antim Ivireanul reveals himself in this document as a rigorous administrator of "monastic assets," a category that included slaves (both nomadic lăieți and sedentary vătrași). To prevent escape and insubordination, Antim personally legislated the use of torture instruments, transforming customary practices into written administrative norms. The text of the "Charter" explicitly states:

"As for the lăieți and vătrași, they shall guard and serve the monastery... and should any be found insubordinate or a runaway, he shall be punished with the stocks and the chain; and if he be more grievously guilty, he shall be handed over to the princely authority."

Petre Petcuț emphasizes the stark contrast between Antim's cultural humanism and his role as a slave owner who institutionalized violence. By clearly prescribing the "stocks" (butucul) and the "chain" in the monastery's regulations, Antim Ivireanul offered a theological and legal justification for the inhumane treatments applied on church estates.

=== Instruments of Torture and Disciplinary Methods ===
Based on the legitimacy provided by such regulations, monasteries developed a complex repressive apparatus. "Insubordination," laziness, or attempted escape triggered punishments that, according to modern historiographical standards, are classified as torture:

- The Spiked Iron Collar (Gulerul de fier): One of the most feared punishments, described by abolitionists (such as Mihail Kogălniceanu) and confirmed by historians, consisted of a metal ring fixed around the slave's neck. The device was equipped with metal spikes pointing inward or outward, specifically designed to prevent the victim from resting. The slave could not lie down or sleep without inflicting severe wounds upon themselves, leading to extreme physical and psychological exhaustion.
- Immobilization in "Stocks" and Chains: Directly confirming Antim Ivireanul's provisions, sources attest to the intensive use of the stocks (butucul)—a massive split wooden beam in which the convict's ankles or hands were locked. Slaves were held captive in these devices for days or weeks, often in the damp and dark cellars of the monastery, unable to move and forced to soil themselves. This immobilization caused severe muscle atrophy and psychological trauma.
- Falanga (Bastinado): An Oriental method of torture frequently adopted in the Principalities. The slave was immobilized with their legs raised and tied to a pole, while the soles of their feet were repeatedly beaten with rods or a whip until the tissue was lacerated, making subsequent walking impossible.
- Torture by Natural Elements: Documents record practices of "tempering" the insubordinate, such as leaving naked slaves in the freezing cold, dousing them with cold water in winter, or "smoking" them—suspending them over a smoldering fire of damp straw, causing partial asphyxiation and panic.

=== Dehumanization and Mortality ("Slow Extermination") ===
The monastic slave system aimed not only at disciplining the body but also at annihilating the human identity of the slave. Historians describe a reality marked by systemic suffering:

- Status of "Speaking Object": In monastery accounting records and inventories, slaves did not appear as persons but as movable inventory ("souls"), listed and valued alongside animals and agricultural tools. This reification allowed abbots to treat the death of a slave strictly as a loss of economic capital.
- Destruction of the Family ("Sale by the Piece"): The deepest psychological trauma was the separation of families. Although the Church preached the sanctity of the family, economic interest prevailed: monasteries routinely practiced the sale, exchange, or separate donation of spouses and children. Children could be torn from their parents and gifted to other masters, losing their lineage forever.
- Living Conditions and Mortality: The daily life of slaves on monastic estates unfolded in conditions of extreme misery, described by historians as a process of "slow extermination." Most lived in unsanitary dugouts (earth pits). Wounds caused by chains or beatings frequently became infected (sepsis), and in the absence of any medical assistance, led to painful deaths. The combination of exhausting labor, malnutrition, and physical abuse led to a life expectancy far below the average of the era and extreme infant mortality.

== The Scale of Slavery in the Orthodox Church: "The Largest Slave Owner" ==
Until the mid-19th century, the Orthodox Church in Wallachia and Moldavia was, institutionally, the largest slave owner after the Princely Court. Historian Viorel Achim estimates that monasteries and metropolitanates owned tens of thousands of Roma families, constituting an essential labor force for the ecclesiastical economy. This immense accumulation of "souls" was achieved through boyar donations (for the forgiveness of sins) and direct purchases, with slaves being considered "the saint's property" and, therefore, inalienable.

=== Major Monastic Slaveholders: Tismana, Cozia, and Putna ===
Archival documents (censuses/catagraphies) show that major monasteries functioned as veritable slave-holding fiefs. The number of slaves owned indicated the prestige and wealth of the institution:

- Tismana Monastery: Was one of the largest slave owners in Wallachia. At the beginning of the 19th century, Tismana owned thousands of slaves organized into specialized "bands" (vătășii) of goldwashers, blacksmiths, and woodworkers (rudari). Historian Petre Petcuț notes that "Tismana's economic power relied exclusively on the free labor of its slaves," who were sent to wash gold in riverbeds or work the land.
- Cozia Monastery: Possessed a large population of slaves, used especially for salt mining and agricultural work. Monastery registers record harsh punishments for those who did not meet their work quotas.
- Putna Monastery (Moldavia): In Moldavia, Putna was a major center for the concentration of the slave population. Documents attest that Stephen the Great and his successors donated hundreds of "dwellings" (sălașe) of Tatars and Gypsies to the monastery. Putna's slaves were renowned for their craftsmanship but also for being frequently sold or exchanged between the monastery's dependencies.

=== The Theology of Slavery: "Donation of Souls" ===
A particular aspect of monastic slavery was its moral justification. Boyars donated entire families of Roma to monasteries through wills, believing that this act of "charity" would ensure the salvation of their souls.

- Historical Quote: In a donation document to Bistrița Monastery, a boyar wrote: "I donate to the holy monastery three dwellings of Gypsies, with women and children, so that my soul and that of my parents may be remembered forever."

This practice transformed the human being into a spiritual currency. The Church accepted and encouraged these donations while simultaneously forbidding the manumission (freeing) of slaves, under the pretext that the monastery's property was sacred and could not be alienated ("anathema" upon those who dared to free the saint's slaves).

=== Economic Exploitation and Goldwashers ===
Monasteries held a monopoly on certain categories of slaves, particularly the goldwashers (aurari or rudari). These were obliged to pay fixed quotas of gold annually to the monastery. Working conditions were inhumane, with slaves forced to stand in the freezing waters of mountain rivers (such as the Lotru or Olt) from spring until autumn. The profits obtained from the gold washed by slaves constituted a major source of revenue for the dioceses, which explains the fierce resistance of the high clergy against the abolition laws of 1848 and 1856.

== Church Opposition to Abolition: Defending "Holy Assets" ==
During the Roma emancipation process (1848–1856), the Orthodox Church positioned itself institutionally as the main opponent of reforms, defending the maintenance of slavery with theological and economic arguments. While the young 1848 revolutionaries demanded unconditional freedom, high hierarchs fought to block the loss of free labor, invoking "curses" upon those who would alienate monastic goods.

=== The Theological Argument: "Anathema" on Liberators ===
Monastic abbots used canon law to discourage any attempt at manumission. They argued that slaves had been donated to the monastery "in perpetuity" by boyars, and freeing them would be equivalent to sacrilege and a violation of the founders' wills.

- Historical Quote: In a letter of protest addressed to the Divan, abbots stated that "these Gypsies are holy assets, gifted to God, and whoever dares to remove them from slavery shall fall under the terrible anathema of the holy fathers and the founders."

=== Reaction to the 1848 Revolution ===
During the Wallachian Revolution of 1848, the Provisional Government decreed the liberation of boyar and monastic slaves. The reaction of the high clergy was hostile. Although some lower clergy (such as Eufrosin Poteca or Iosafat Snagoveanul) supported the reform, the upper hierarchy sabotaged its implementation.

- Period Testimony: Mihail Kogălniceanu, the architect of abolition, vehemently criticized the Metropolitanate's attitude in a famous speech:

"The ministers of the altar, who should preach love for one's neighbor, are the first to keep their brothers in slavery, buying and selling them like cattle. How can the priest raise his hands to heaven, when those hands are stained by the chains they put on slaves?"

=== The Battle for Compensation (1855–1856) ===
When the abolition of slavery became inevitable, the Church changed its strategy, negotiating fiercely to obtain maximum financial compensation. The Metropolitanate refused to free slaves without payment, treating human freedom as a commercial transaction.

- The Indemnity Law: Following pressure from the clergy, the state was forced to pay from the public budget (the Compensation Fund) a massive sum of **10 gold coins** (ducats) for each freed monastic slave. This money was transferred to the monasteries to compensate for the "loss" suffered.

Historian Petre Petcuț notes: "The Church's resistance was overcome only by transforming slavery into a profitable business: monasteries accepted the freedom of the Roma only in exchange for gold."

== Emergence of the abolitionist movement ==
The moral and social problems posed by Roma slavery were first acknowledged during the Age of Enlightenment, firstly by Western European visitors to the two countries.

The evolution of Romanian society and the abolition of serfdom in 1746 in Wallachia and 1749 in Moldavia had no effect on the Roma, who, in the 19th century, were subject to the same conditions they endured for centuries. It was only when the Phanariote regime was changed, soon after 1821, that Romanian society began to modernise itself and various reforms were implemented (see Regulamentul Organic). However, the slavery of the Roma was not considered a priority and it was ignored by most reformers.

Nevertheless, the administration in the Danubian Principalities did try to change the status of the state Romas, by attempting the sedentarization of the nomads. Two annexes to Regulamentul Organic were drafted, "Regulation for Improving the Condition of State Gypsies" in Wallachia in April 1831, and "Regulation for the Settlement of Gypsies" in Moldavia. The regulations attempted to sedenterize the Romas and train them till the land, encouraging them to settle on private estates.

By the late 1830s, liberal and radical boyars, many of whom studied in Western Europe, particularly in Paris, had taken the first steps toward the anti-slavery goal. During that period, Ion Câmpineanu, like the landowning brothers Nicolae and Ştefan Golescu, emancipated all his slave retinue, while boyar Emanoil Bălăceanu freed his slaves and organized for them the Scăieni Phalanstery, an utopian socialist community. In 1836, Wallachian Prince Alexandru II Ghica freed 4,000 domneşti slaves and had a group of landowners sign them up as paid workforce, while instigating a policy through which the state purchased privately owned slaves and set them free.

The emancipation of slaves owned by the state and Romanian Orthodox and Greek Orthodox monasteries was mentioned in the programme of the 1839 confederative conspiracy of Leonte Radu in Moldavia, giving them equal rights with the Romanians. In Wallachia, a memorandum written by Mitică Filipescu proposed to put an end to slavery by allowing the slaves to buy their own freedom. The 1848 generation, which studied in Western Europe, particularly in Paris, returned to their countries with progressive views and a wish to modernize them following the West as an example. Slavery had been abolished in most of the "civilized world" and, as such, the liberal Romanian intelligentsia viewed its slavery as a barbaric practice, with a feeling of shame.

Abolition by category of slaves
Country	State slaves	Church slaves	Private slaves
Wallachia	1843	1847	1856
Moldavia	1844	1844	1855

In 1837, Mihail Kogălniceanu published a book on the Roma people, in which he expressed the hope that it will serve the abolitionists. During the 1840s, the intellectuals began a campaign aimed at convincing the slaveholders to free their slaves. The Wallachian Cezar Bolliac published in his Foaie pentru Minte, Inimă şi Literatură an appeal to intellectuals to support the cause of the abolitionist movement. From just a few voices advocating abolitionism in the 1830s, in the 1840s, it became a subject of great debate in Romanian society. The political power was in the hand of the conservative boyars, who were also owners of large numbers of slaves and as such disagreed to any reforms that might affect them.

== Laws on abolition ==
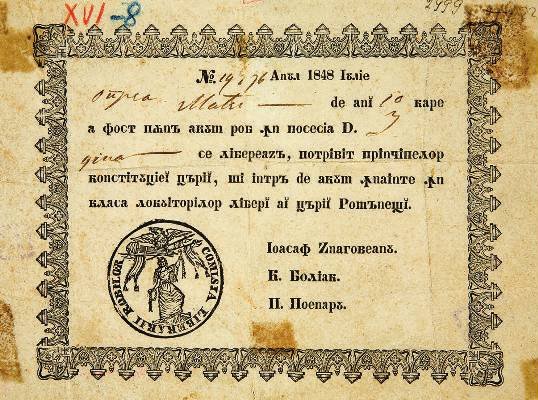
Slave liberation certificate issued during the Wallachian Revolution of 1848

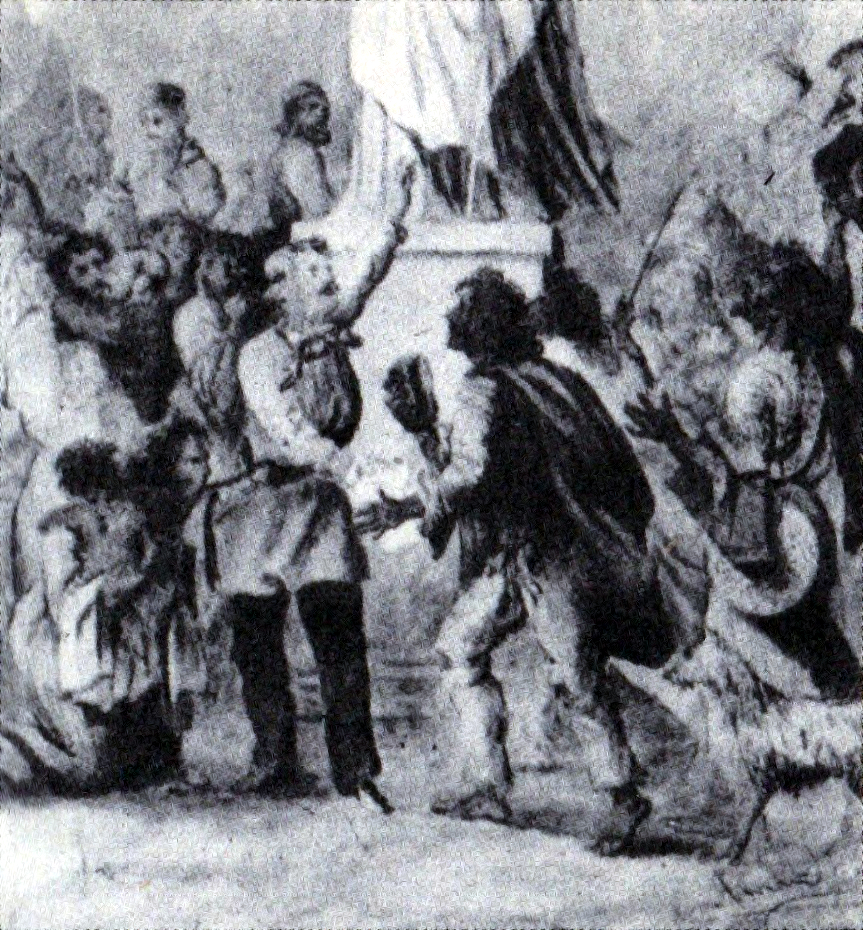
Allegory of the abolition of slavery during the Wallachian Revolution of 1848, drawing by Theodor Aman

The earliest law which freed a category of slaves was in March 1843 in Wallachia, which transferred the control of the state slaves owned by the prison authority to the local authorities, leading to their sedentarizing and becoming peasants. A year later, in 1844, Moldavian Prince Mihail Sturdza proposed a law on the freeing of slaves owned by the church and state. In 1847, in Wallachia, a law of Prince Gheorghe Bibescu adopted by the Divan freed the slaves owned by the church and the rest of the slaves owned by the state institutions.

During the Wallachian Revolution of 1848, the agenda of the short-lived Provisional Government included the emancipation (dezrobire) of the Roma as one of the main social demands. The Government decreed the complete emancipation of the Roma by compensating the owners and it made a commission (made out of three members: Bolliac, Ioasaf Znagoveanu, and Petrache Poenaru), which was intended to implement the decree. Some boyars freed their slaves without asking for compensation, while others strongly fought against the idea of abolition. Nevertheless, after the revolution was quelled by Ottoman and Imperial Russian troops, the slaves returned to their previous status.

By the 1850s, after its tenets were intensely popularized, the movement gained support from almost the whole of Romanian society, the issues of contention being the exact date of Roma freedom, and whether their owners would receive any form of compensation (a measure which the abolitionists considered "immoral").

In Moldavia, in December 1855, following a proposal by Prince Grigore Alexandru Ghica, a bill drafted by Mihail Kogălniceanu and Petre Mavrogheni was adopted by the Divan; the law emancipated all slaves to the status of taxpayers (that is, citizens). The measure was brought about by a personal tragedy: Ghica and the public opinion at large were scandalized when Dincă, the slave and illegitimate child of a Cantacuzino boyar, was not allowed to marry his French mistress and go free, which had led him to murder his lover and kill himself. The owners would receive a compensation of 8 galbeni for lingurari and vătraşi and 4 galbeni for lăieşi, the money being provided by the taxes paid by previously freed slaves.

In Wallachia, only two months later, in February 1856, a similar law was adopted by the National Assembly, paying a compensation of 10 galbeni for each slave, in stages over a number of years. The freed slaves had to settle to a town or village and stay there for at least two censuses and they would pay their taxes to the compensation fund.

== Condition of the Roma after the abolition ==
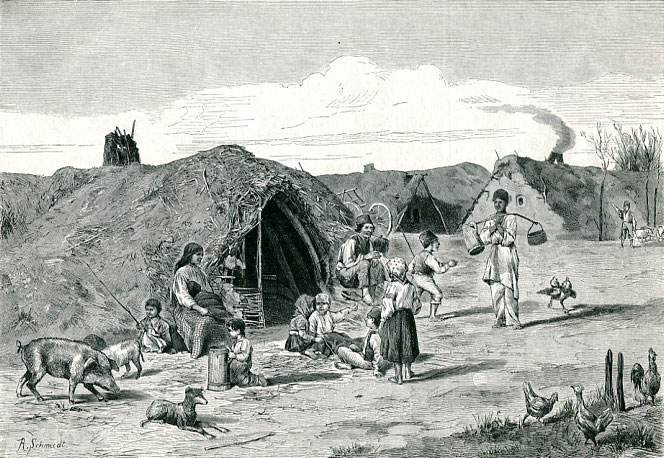
A Roma village in Romania after the abolition of slavery, 1884

The Romanian abolitionists debated on the future of the former slaves both before and after the laws were passed. This issue became interconnected with the "peasantry issue", an important goal of the being eliminating the corvée and turning bondsmen into small landowners. The Ursari (nomadic bear handlers) were the most reticent to the idea of settling down because they saw settling down as becoming slaves again on the owner of the land where they settled. The abolitionists themselves saw turning the former slaves into bondsmen as not something desirable, as they were bound to become dependent again. Nevertheless, the dispute ended after the Romanian Principalities adopted a liberal capitalist property legislation, the corvée being eliminated and the land being divided between the former boyars and the peasants.

Many abolitionists supported the assimilation of the Roma in the Romanian nation, Kogălniceanu noting that there were settled Roma slaves who abandoned their customs and language and they could not be told apart from the Romanians. Among the social engineering techniques proposed for assimilation were: the Roma to be scattered across Romanian villages (within the village and not on the fringes), encouraging inter-ethnical marriages, banning the usage of Romany language and compulsory education for their children. After the emancipation, the state institutions initially avoided the usage of the word țigan (gypsy), when needed (such as in the case of tax privileges), the official term being emancipat.

Despite the good will of many abolitionists, the social integration of the former slaves was carried out only for a part of them, many of the Roma remaining outside the social organization of the Wallachian, Moldavian and later, Romanian society. The social integration policies were generally left to be implemented by the local authorities. In some parts of the country, the nomadic Roma were settled in villages under the supervision of the local police, but across the country, Roma nomadism was not eliminated.

== Legacy ==
Support for the abolitionists was reflected in Romanian literature of the mid-19th century. The issue of the Roma slavery became a theme in the literary works of various liberal and Romantic intellectuals, many of whom were active in the abolitionist camp. Cezar Bolliac published poems such as Fata de boier şi fata de ţigan ("The Boyar's daughter and the Gypsy’s daughter", 1843), Ţiganul vândut ("Sold Gypsy", 1843), O ţigancă cu pruncul său la Statuia Libertăţii ("A Gypsy woman with her baby at the Statue of Liberty", 1848), Ion Heliade Rădulescu wrote a short story named Jupân Ion (roughly, "Master John", from the Romanian-language version of Župan; 1844), Vasile Alecsandri also wrote a short story, Istoria unui Galbân ("History of a gold coin", 1844), while Gheorghe Asachi wrote a play called Ţiganii ("The Gypsies", 1856) and V. A. Urechia the novel Coliba Măriucăi ("Măriuca's cabin", 1855). A generation later, the fate of Ştefan Răzvan was the inspiration for Răzvan şi Vidra ("Răzvan and Vidra", 1867), a play by Bogdan Petriceicu Hasdeu. The topic of Roma slavery was taken up again by the arts in the early 21st century, being a subject explored by Radu Jude's 2015 film Aferim!, set in early 19th-century Wallachia.

The Romanian abolitionist movement was also influenced by the much larger movement against Black slavery in the United States through press reports and through a translation of Harriet Beecher Stowe's Uncle Tom's Cabin. Translated by Theodor Codrescu and first published in Iaşi in 1853, under the name Coliba lui Moşu Toma sau Viaţa negrilor în sudul Statelor Unite din America (which translates back as "Uncle Toma's Cabin or the Life of Blacks in the Southern United States of America"), it was the first American novel to be published in Romanian, and it included a foreword study on slavery by Mihail Kogălniceanu. Beecher Stowe's text was also the main inspiration behind Urechia's 1855 novel.

The impact of slavery on Romanian society became a theme of historiographic interest in the decades after the Romanian revolution of 1989. In 2007, Prime Minister Călin Popescu-Tăriceanu approved the creation of Comisia pentru Studierea Robiei Romilor ("Commission for the Study of Roma Slavery"), which will present its findings in a report and will make recommendations for the Romanian education system and on promoting the history and culture of the Roma. The commission, presided upon by Neagu Djuvara, will also recommend the creation of a museum of the Roma, a research center, a Roma slavery commemoration day and the building of a memorial dedicated to Roma slavery.

== See also ==
- Serfdom in Moldavia and Wallachia
- Black Sea slave trade
- Balkan slave trade

== Sources ==
- Viorel Achim, "Romanian Abolitionists on the Future of the Emancipated Gypsies", in Transylvanian Review, Vol. XIX, Supplement no. 4 (2010) pp. 22-36
- Elena Marushiakova, Vesselin Popov. 2009. "Gypsy Slavery in Wallachia and Moldavia". In: Kamusella, Tomasz and Krzysztof Jaskulowski, eds. Nationalisms Today. Oxford: Peter Lang, ISBN 9783039118830 pp. 89-124.
- Djuvara, Neagu (1995). Între Orient şi Occident. Ţările române la începutul epocii moderne [Between East and West. The Romanian countries at the beginning of the modern era] (in Romanian). Bucharest: Humanitas. ISBN 973-28-0523-4.
