= Battle of the Cosmin Forest =

1497 Polish defeat by Ottomans and Moldavians

- Part of the Polish–Ottoman War (1485–1503) and Moldavian campaign (1497–1499)
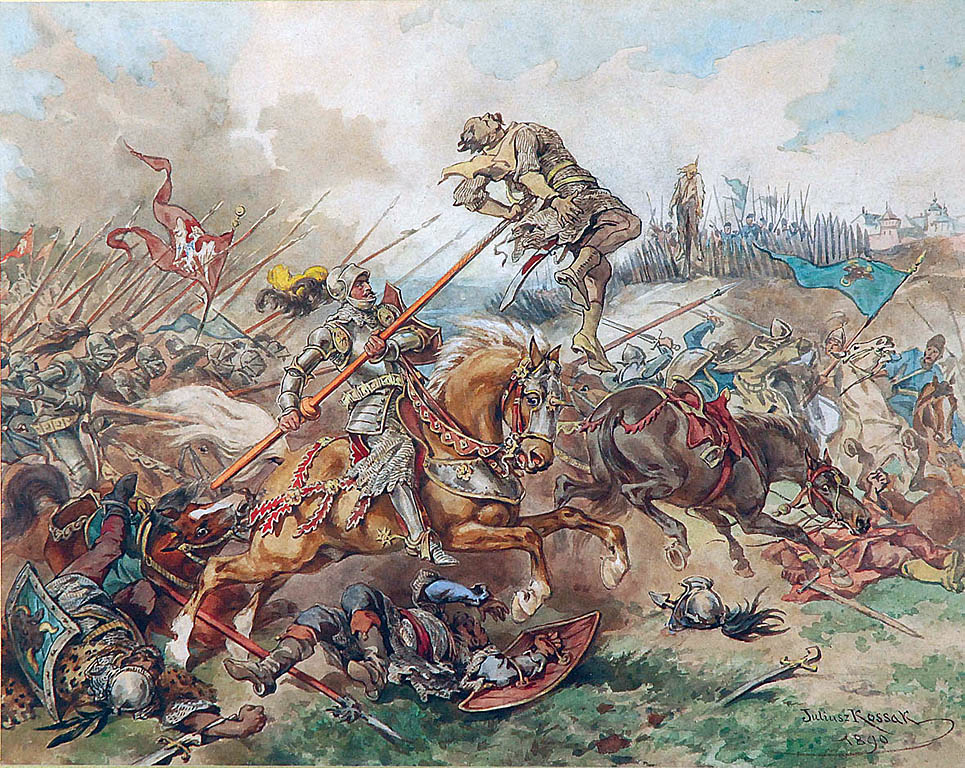
- Cherubin Gniewosz in the battle of Suceava (original by J. Kossak, c. 1890) (English)
Date	26 October 1497
Location	Cosmin Forest, Moldavia, Ottoman Empire (today in Chernivtsi Oblast, Ukraine)
Result	Moldavian victory

Belligerents
Kingdom of Poland; Teutonic Order	Moldavia; Ottoman Empire; Crimean Khanate; Wallachia

Commanders and leaders
King John I Albert; Stanisław Chodecki; Jan Teczynski (POW)	Stephen III of Moldavia

Strength
59,400 men	44,000: 18,000 Moldavians; 12,000 Transylvanians; 8,000 Wallachians; 5,000 Ottomans; 1,000 Crimean Tatars

Casualties and losses
11,000	Unknown

The Battle of the Cosmin Forest was a military engagement between the Kingdom of Poland and a coalition army led by Stephen the Great consisting of mainly Moldavian forces alongside Transylvanian, Wallachian, Ottoman, and Crimean deployments. The battle resulted in a major victory for the coalition army.

== Background ==
In the year 1484, the Ottomans had conquered the last Moldavian ports in the Black Sea, Bilhorod-Dnistrovskyi and Kiliia, making the Black Sea an Ottoman lake. The Ottoman victories prompted the Moldavian ruler, Stephen the Great, to seek an alliance with the Kingdom of Poland, which provided a force of 3,000 cavalry. The Moldavian-Polish army defeated the Ottomans at the Battle of Cătlăbuga, enabling Stephan to seek a peace treaty with the Ottoman Sultan. The Polish king, Casimir IV Jagiellon, received papal approval to launch a crusade against the Ottomans. Casimir died, and his successor, John I Albert, took the initiative for the crusading plans. John entered Moldavia to help Stephan reclaim the lost forts from the Ottomans. However, John's primary goal was to place his brother, Sigismund, on the Moldavian throne.

== Prelude ==
Stephan was disappointed and asked for help from his neighboring states, including Ottomans, Crimeans, and Wallachians. John besieged the Moldavian city of Suceava. The siege began from September 24 to October 19, 1497. The Moldavians and their allies launched a fierce guerrilla war against the Polish camps and communication lines. The Moldavians ruthlessly impaled Polish captives. The siege failed in the end. Stephan has gained the support of 12,000 Transylvanians, 8,000 Wallachians, 5,000 Ottoman Akinji, and some thousands of Crimean Tatars. Stephan had a force of 18,000 Moldavians.

After some negotiations, the Poles left Suceava on 19 October; apparently, Stephen had granted them safe passage on the condition that they return to Poland the same way they had come when marching on Suceava and warned that he would not allow another part of his country to be devastated by the Polish troops in their retreat. John I Albert formally accepted this condition; however, in practice, he decided to retreat on a different and unfamiliar route through Bukovina to Sniatyn. The Polish army was divided into four columns: Greater Poland had 18,000 men, the king's court and magnates had 7,000, Lesser Poland had 30,000, and the rear had 4,000 men and a detachment of 400 Teutonic Knights. The army also had 1,200-1,500 cargo carts between the professional army and the Lesser Poland Column.

== Battle ==
The Poles were passing, and the Moldavians and their allies spared the Greater Poland column since it was more organized. However, they ambushed the second column and the rest. The battle began on the night of 25 October. The Moldavians attacked the rear, which was led by Stanisław Chodecki. Chodecki managed to withstand the Moldavian onslaught. As the cargo entered the forest, the Moldavians began cutting down the large trees, killing men and horses. The Moldavian infantry swarmed on both sides of the road, killing many of the panicking Poles. Around half of the personnel protecting the cargo were killed or captured.

On the Lesser Poland Column, they were attacked by a joint Moldavian, Ottoman, Crimean, and Wallachian force on the left side of the road. The Poles in the column weren't wearing their armor and were pressed into rocky slopes on the right side of the road. The column was out of communication lines with their leaders. Soon, the Lesser Poland's column collapsed and became prey to the Allies. The column lost about 7,500 men, a quarter of its force. King John ordered his court companies under Jan Teczynski to countercharge against the enemy. John began moving along; his columns began repelling the attackers. The Lesser Poland column partially recovered and fought back. The Allies began retreating, and the Poles chased them. The chase failed, and Jan Teczynski was captured by the Ottomans. The Polish army had lost 11,000 of its troops, a fifth of its forces, while the Teutonic Order suffered a considerable amount of losses and lost all their cannons to the Moldavians during their retreat.

== Aftermath ==
The Polish army suffered a disastrous defeat, which dissuaded the Polish king from challenging Ottoman supremacy on the Black Sea. Shortly after the battle, in 1498, the Ottomans and the Crimeans began launching raids on Poland, sacking Polish cities. Poland sued for peace in 1499.

== Sources ==
- Si Sheppard (2025), Crescent Dawn, The Rise of the Ottoman Empire and the Making of the Modern Age.
- Vladimir Shirogorov (2021), War on the Eve of Nations, Conflicts and Militaries in Eastern Europe, 1450–1500.
- Ninja Bumann (2024), Handbook on the History and Culture of the Black Sea Region.
- Tadeusz Grabarczyk (2017), The Polish court banner in the Moldavian expedition in 1497.
