= Stanisław Chodecki =

Polish military commander and marshal

Stanisław Chodecki (z Chodcza - of Chodecz) of Ogończyk coat of arms (died 1529) was a Polish military commander (hetman) from 1492 to 1499 and 1501 to 1505 and also a marshal.
