= John I Albert =

King of Poland from 1492 to 1501

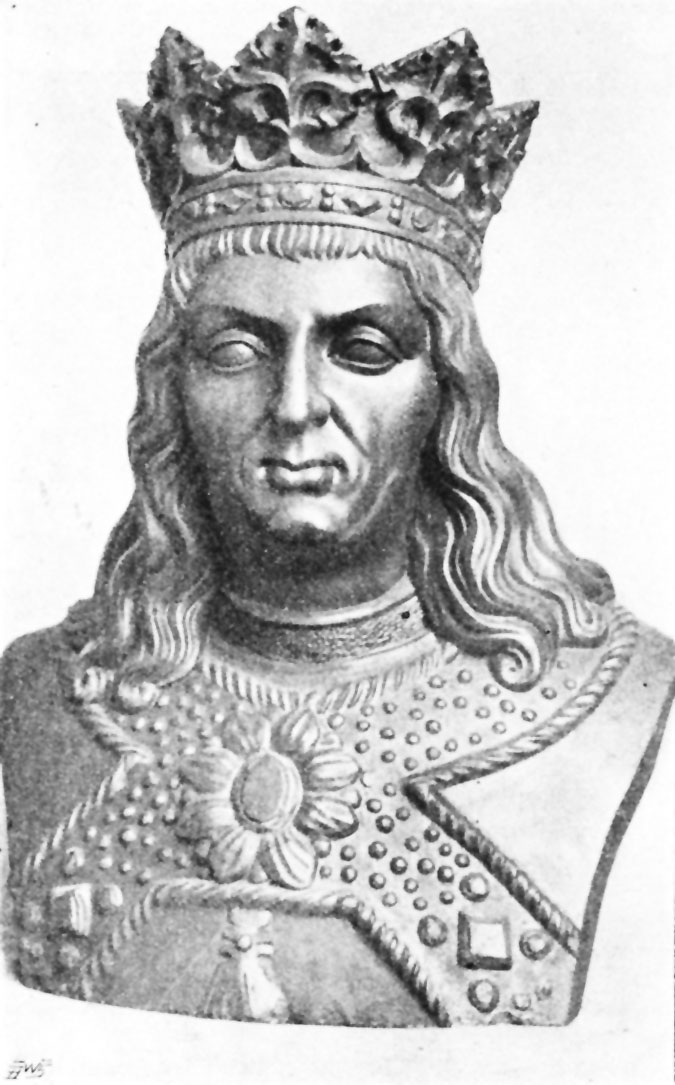
- John Albert's tomb effigy at Wawel Cathedral

King of Poland
- Reign: 27 August 1492 – 17 June 1501
- Coronation: 23 September 1492
- Predecessor: Casimir IV
- Successor: Alexander

Supreme Duke of Lithuania (disputed)
- Reign: Summer 1492 (Note: John Albert styled himself as the Supreme Duke sometime after Alexander's election as the Grand Duke in July 1492. His title was recognized by Alexander but not by Lithuanian Council of Lords.) – 17 June 1501
- Predecessor: Casimir
- Successor: Alexander
- Co-ruler (Grand Duke): Alexander
- Born: 27 December 1459; Kraków, Kingdom of Poland
- Died: 17 June 1501 (aged 41); Toruń, Kingdom of Poland
- Burial: July 1501; Wawel Cathedral, Kraków
- Dynasty: Jagiellon
- Father: Casimir IV of Poland
- Mother: Elizabeth of Austria
- Religion: Roman Catholic

John I Albert (Polish: Jan I Olbracht; 27 December 1459 – 17 June 1501) was King of Poland and (disputed) Supreme Duke of Lithuania from 1492 to his death, as well as Duke of Głogów from 1491 to 1498. He was the fourth Polish sovereign from the Jagiellonian dynasty and the son of Casimir IV and Elizabeth of Austria.

Related to the House of Habsburg, John Albert was groomed to become emperor in the Holy Roman Empire, a plan that ultimately failed. He was well-educated and tutored by scholars such as Johannes Longinus and Callimachus, whom he had subsequently befriended. Heavily influenced by the Italian Renaissance, John sought to strengthen royal authority at the expense of the Catholic Church and the clergy. In 1487, he led a force against the Ottoman Empire and defeated the Tatars of the Crimean Khanate during the early phase of the Polish–Ottoman War. In the aftermath of the Bohemian–Hungarian War, John Albert attempted to usurp Hungary from his elder brother Vladislaus, but on 20 February 1491, he renounced his claim to Hungary in exchange for the Duchy of Głogów and the suzerainty over half of Silesia.

Casimir died in 1492, and John was passed over as the Grand Duke of Lithuania in favour of his younger Alexander, thus de facto breaking the personal union between the two nations, though John claimed the position of Supreme Duke. John was elected as the King of Poland on 27 August of the same year, after which to secure his succession to the Polish throne he had dispatched an army against the Piast princes from the Duchy of Masovia, which ensured his victory but alienated the higher nobles and magnates. He later invaded Masovia to deprive Konrad III of his ancestral holdings and curtail internal opposition to his rule. In 1497, John Albert launched a personal crusade into Moldavia to uphold Polish suzerainty, establish control over Black Sea ports and dethrone Stephen III in favour of John Albert's brother Sigismund. The campaign's failure greatly hindered Polish expansion into Southern Europe, preventing any significant further expansion.

John Albert remains a largely forgotten and overlooked figure in the history of Poland, his relatively short reign ended in a major military setback, and he was criticised during his lifetime for embracing absolutism as well as attempting to centralise the government. He is credited for creating a bicameral parliament, comprising the Senate and the Sejm, which granted lower-class gentry the right of expression in the matters of state. Conversely, he limited the movement of serfs by confining them to nobles' estates.

== Early life, 1459–1492 ==
=== Birth and family background ===
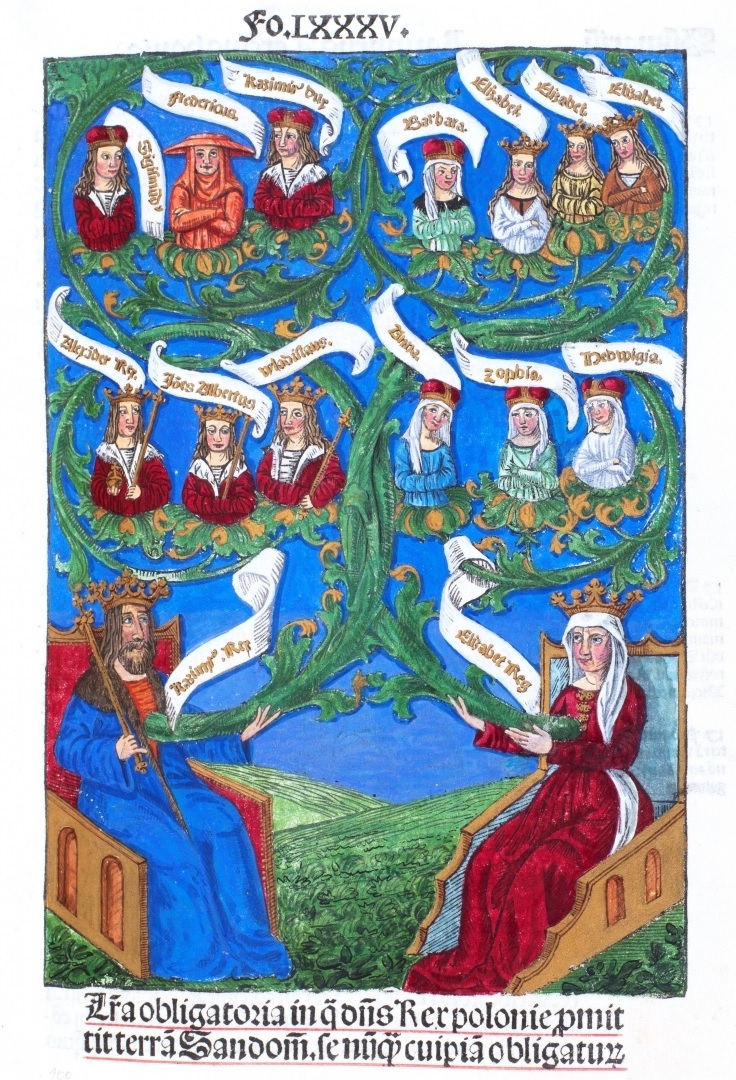
Casimir IV and Elizabeth Habsburg with their thirteen children, 1506. John Albert is placed between brothers Alexander and Vladislaus.

John was born on 27 December 1459 at Wawel Castle in Kraków, which served as the seat of Polish monarchs. He was one of thirteen children and the third son born to Casimir IV Jagiellon and Elizabeth Habsburg. His mother was the second child of Albert II, Duke of Austria and King of the Romans, and the granddaughter of Sigismund, Holy Roman Emperor. It was the ambition of John's parents to install one of their sons as Emperor in the Holy Roman Empire. Thus, he received the second name Albert at christening to honour his maternal grandfather and in the hope of securing his candidacy to the Imperial throne.

Paternally, John was the grandson of Jogaila, the pagan ruler of Lithuania who, upon the marriage to Jadwiga of Poland, adopted Catholicism, converted his native people to Christianity and was crowned King of Poland as Władysław II Jagiełło in 1386. Subsequently, his descendants held a strong claim to the Grand Duchy of Lithuania. The Lithuanian lords were at first apprehensive about forming a union with Poland. The Lithuanian nobility and minorities feared that merging the two countries would threaten their sovereignty. The Poles were also dissatisfied as the Jagiellonians possessed no blood relations with their predecessors, the Piasts, who de facto ruled since the creation of statehood in AD 966. In the wake of Władysław II's death, his eldest son Władysław III succeeded him in Poland, and Casimir, his younger son, in Lithuania. Władysław III was killed in the Battle of Varna in 1444, which made Casimir and his sons potential successors to both titles. Casimir was reluctant to accept the Polish crown and only did so when his opponents, Bolesław IV of Warsaw and Frederick II, Elector of Brandenburg, strengthened their efforts. Raised abroad, he was initially branded as illegitimate by the Poles and was influenced by the Lithuanian gentry, whom he supported in their calls for a separate state.

John's successiont to the throne came entirely by accident. His eldest brother, Vladislaus was to inherit Poland and Lithuania by primogeniture. This changed when George of Poděbrady pledged to make Vladislaus his heir in neighbouring Bohemia on the condition that Casimir IV negotiated a peace treaty with Matthias Corvinus of Hungary. Although that negotiation failed, the Bohemian Diet elected Vladislaus the King of Bohemia following George's death in 1471. Casimir IV's second son and his namesake, Casimir, then became the new heir apparent in Poland, however, he fell ill with tuberculosis and died in 1484. Six years later, Vladislaus was proclaimed King of Hungary, which was met with hostility from a faction of Hungarian nobles advocating for John Albert. Motivated by the Hungarians, John briefly invaded Hungary to usurp the title but was defeated by his brother at Košice in 1491 and again at Prešov in 1492. In spite of the conflict, the bond between the two siblings remained unhindered, and Vladislaus made John the Duke of Głogów for life to satisfy his ambition.

=== Education ===
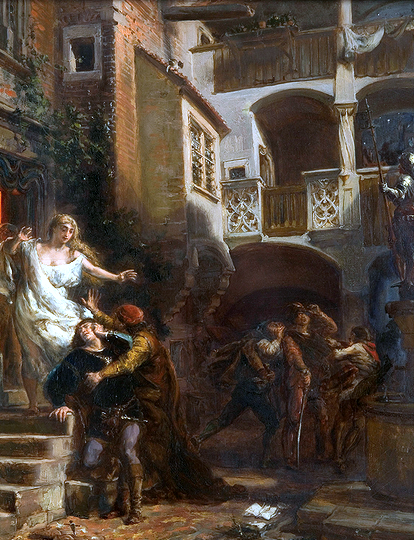
Night adventures of John Albert and Callimachus, painting by Jan Matejko, 1881

Casimir IV was determined to educate all his sons equally and prepare them to assume the role of a monarch. In September 1467, chronicler and historian Johannes Longinus (Polish: Jan Długosz) was entrusted by Casimir with tutoring the royal children, including young John. Longinus, a deeply spiritual man, made sure that the princes were raised with great care and in accordance with Church laws. During their childhood, John and his brother Alexander were instructed to regularly visit the tombs of past sovereigns in an attempt to strengthen their allegiance to Poland. Latin and German, law, history, rhetoric, and classical literature were part of the rigid curriculum. According to the 16th-century political writer Stanisław Orzechowski, John was subjected to corporal punishment which was encouraged by his father.

The Italian humanist and diplomat Filippo Buonaccorsi, known as Callimachus or Kallimach, exercised immense authority and influence over John in his early years and during his reign. He was initially appointed royal advisor and mentor at the behest of Queen Elizabeth. Buonaccorsi was described as more lenient and moderate than Longinus; he amended the syllabus with chess, sports and ancient studies concerning the works of Cicero and Virgil. Radical for the time, many of his ideas and theories were later endorsed by John, such as limiting the power of the clergy and centralising the government. Buonaccorsi further argued for the strengthening of the king's authority, and asserting an absolute monarchy, at the expense of the nobility and inconspicuously advocated for the split with Rome. His appeal extended beyond politics and diplomacy; he befriended John and remained his most trusted courtier until he died in 1496.

== Reign, 1492–1501 ==
=== Accession, 1492 ===
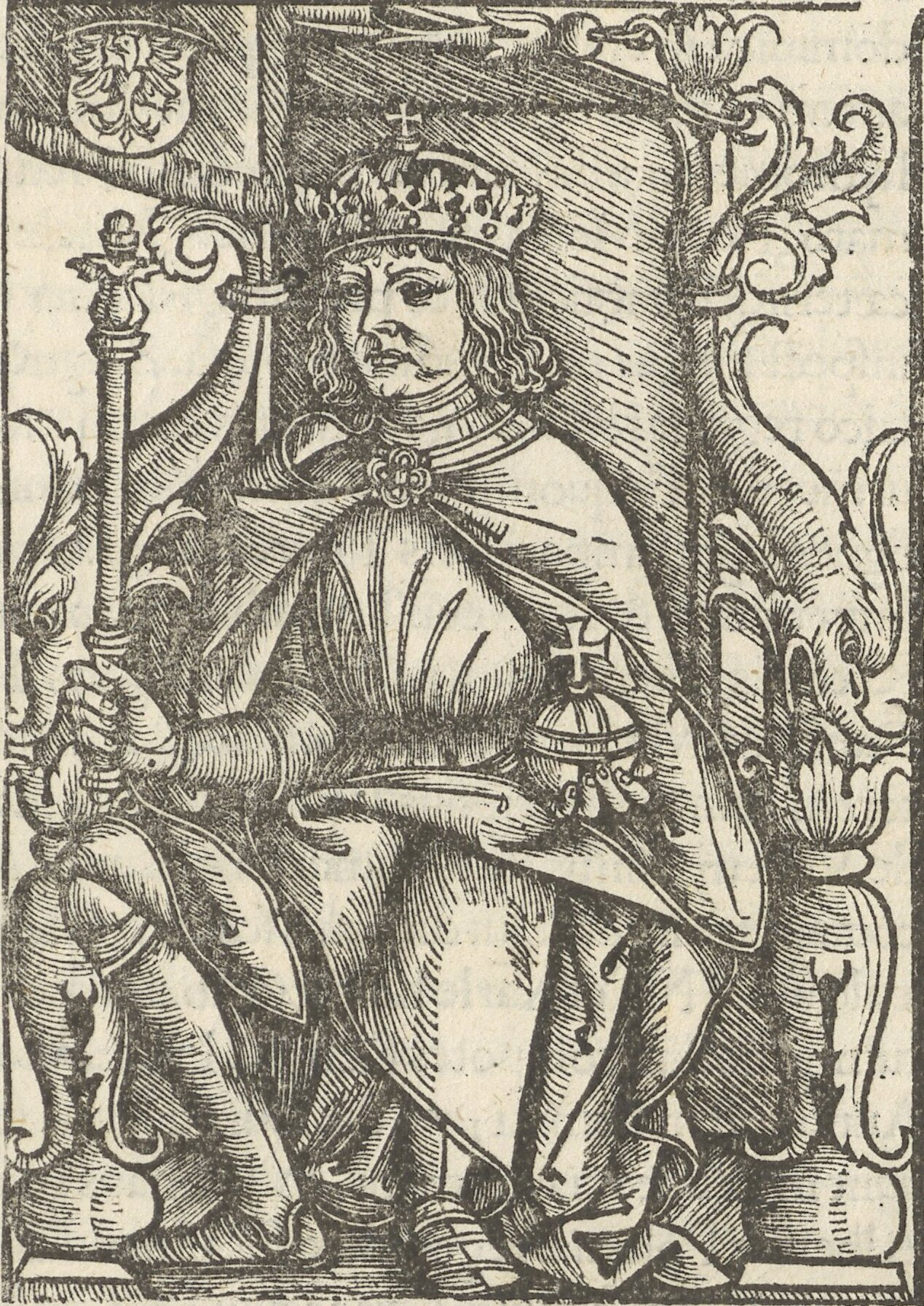
John on an excerpt from Chronica Polonorum, 1521

In accordance with the Union of Horodło (1413), Lithuania was to elect the Grand Duke by its own independent assembly of nobles in Vilnius. In turn, the Polish Crown Diet was obliged to nominate the King of Poland. These titles could be shared by one individual whose election was confirmed by both assemblies. On his deathbed, Casimir IV requested that John succeed him in the Crown and Alexander Jagiellon in the Grand Duchy. Lithuanian dignitaries were satisfied with the proposition; a cluster of Polish nobility wished to continue the personal union between the two countries and initially opted for Alexander. Ultimately, Lithuanian nobles elected Alexander as ther Grand Duke in July 1492, without seeking approval from Poland; John acknowledged his brother's new position but he claimed the nominal position of senior co-ruler as the Supreme Duke. This notion was accepted by Alexander but rejected by Lithuanian Council of Lords.

An electoral tribunal convened on 15 August 1492 in the city of Piotrków. The assembled nobles were to decide which candidate should ascend the throne. John's successful 1487 engagement during the Polish–Ottoman War (1485–1503) against the Crimean Khanate and its Tatar units in the far east was a considerable determinant. Others pointed out his failed intervention in Hungary against his brother. Personal characteristics made the nobles agitated; although intelligent, John Albert was often described as supercilious and intolerably arrogant. In consequence, the Tęczyński and Leszczyński magnates voiced their support for John's younger brother Sigismund, distinguished by his intellect and presumed chastity.

Quarrels between highly-elevated members of state marked the tribunal; it was their course of action that determined the outcome. A considerable threat to the assembly were Janusz II of Płock and his brother Konrad, escorted a company of 1,000 hardline soldiers sent from the Duchy of Masovia. Janusz's candidacy was endorsed by a strictly covert contingent of conservatives, whose intention was to restore the ancient House of Piast on the Polish throne. Zbigniew Oleśnicki, Primate of Poland, was part of that faction but was unable to attend due to poor health. Thereby, the Queen Dowager Elizabeth nominated her acquiescent son, Frederick Jagiellon, to lead the proceedings in his stead.

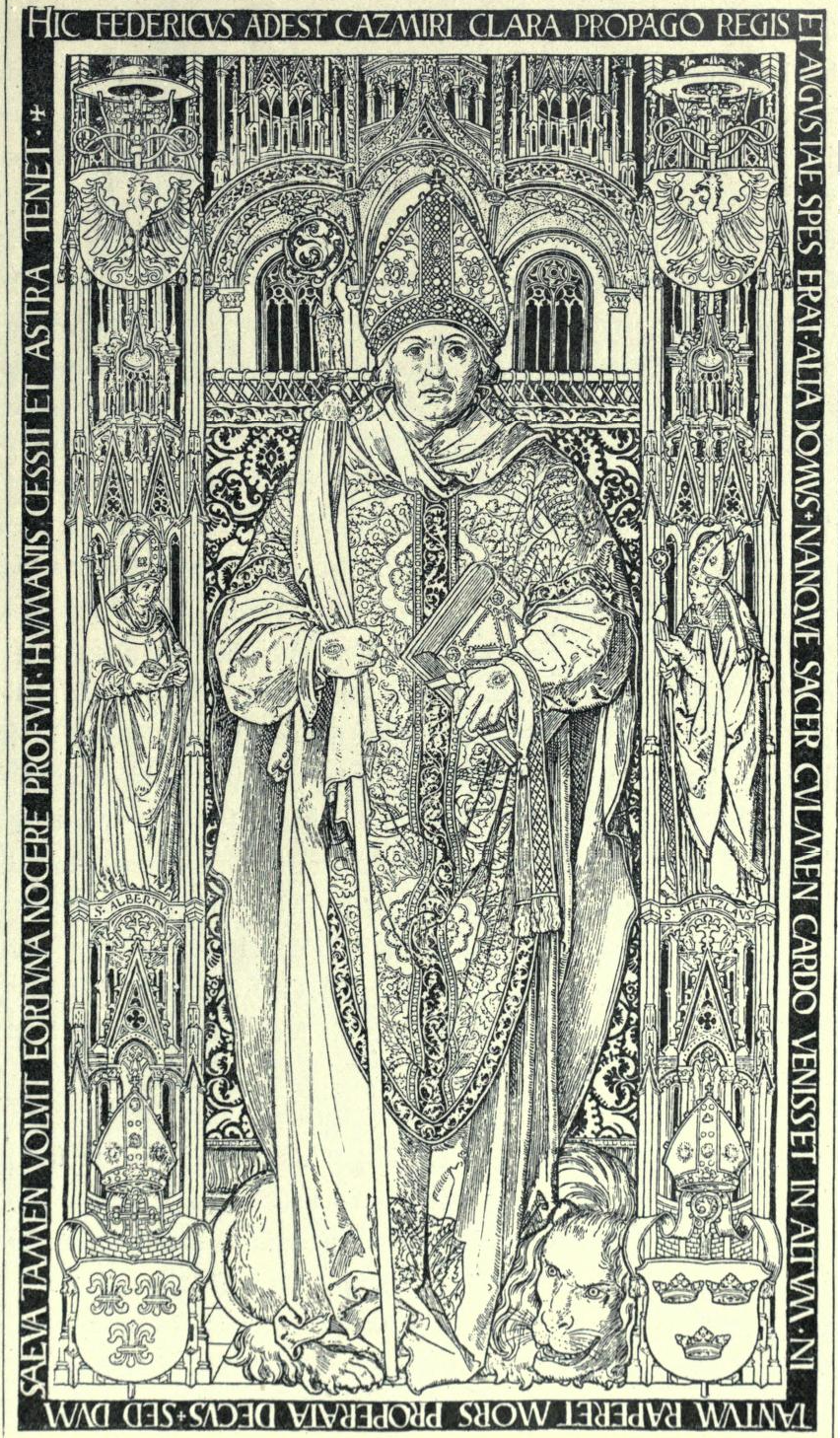
Epitaph of Cardinal Frederick Jagiellon, who contributed to John's election in 1492.

An army of 1,600 men was dispatched to counter Janusz and Konrad if their troops resorted to violence. Meanwhile, John preoccupied himself with negotiations and aimed to procure the Prussian vote by recognising Lucas Watzenrode as the new Prince-Bishop of Warmia. In the end, it was Frederick's personal intervention that secured the crown for John, who was unanimously proclaimed king by an oral ballot amongst the shrieks of nobles on 27 August 1492. A courier carried the news to the burghers of Kraków, which brought great joy to the townsfolk and prompted a bonfire celebration. The entourage then hurried to the capital, where he was crowned at Wawel Cathedral just less than a month later, on 23 September, by his ailing adversary Oleśnicki.

John Albert's first months as king were unsettling and marred by insecurities. The Masovian Dukes still posed a considerable threat and placed his reign in jeopardy, with Masovia being independent of Poland at the time. In December 1492, John turned to Vladislaus and formed a much needed military alliance with Hungary against common foes. The brothers pledged mutual assistance and vowed to quell any opposition that undermined their rule.

=== Creation of parliament, 1493 ===
Constitutionalism and parliamentary tendencies in Poland date back to the Late Middle Ages, when Louis I issued the 1374 Privilege of Koszyce, granting the nobility concessions (tax reductions) and prerogatives in return for favours or military support. Earlier attempts at unifying lower-class gentry with the high magnates into a single political entity were largely unsuccessful. Nobles of lower social status objected to the judiciary practices, superintended by their upper-class counterparts, which caused much discontent throughout the nobility. A major breakthrough came in 1454, when John's father, Casimir, approved the Statutes of Nieszawa; which obligated the monarch to seek advice from the gentry and sejmiks (regional land councils) before taking action. According to Aleksander Gieysztor, the statutes acted as a counterweight to the oligarchy cultivated by the magnates and paved the way for an early parliamentary system.

Before establishing a long-lasting legislative body of government, the Polish king would summon a so-called curia regis which had no real authority over the sovereign. Its permanent members comprised the consiliarii — trusted courtiers and loyal dignitaries personally selected by the reigning monarch. Under John Albert, the curia regis slowly transformed itself into the Senate of Poland. There were changes in conventional practices, for instance, Casimir IV first debated with his close council and then travelled to individual provincial sejmiks. John, on the other hand, called the sejmiks' representatives from across the country to gather and create a single unified assembly.

In January 1493, the first parliament composed of two chambers convened in Piotrków, which would host successive tribunals and parliament sittings long into the 16th century. The Sejm summoned on 18 January, the precise inauguration date is difficult to determine as the king stayed in Kraków until 13 January, and subsequently left for the town of Nowy Korczyn where the Lesser Polish nobility gathered on the 15th of the same month. He then returned to the capital before departing for Miechów and finally arriving in Piotrków no later than 28 January. It is, widely regarded that John's entourage and the Lesser Polish lords arrived late to the parliament. Historian Antoni Walawender outlined that the weather conditions were not to blame, as the January of 1493 appeared relatively warm and dry. The delay may have been attributed to the extensive distance covered (approximately 40–50 kilometres a day), as well as to the festivities and welcoming ceremonies in each town his royal cortège passed. On 2 March, the king issued a universal act on taxation and closed the assembly on 3 March.

=== Expelling Jews from Kraków, 1494–1495 ===
In June 1494, a fire broke out in Kraków during the visit of a Turkish envoy. Panic arose when the Church of Saint Mark and nearby settlements became engulfed in flames. Commoners began to speculate and blamed the Jews for the inferno. Jewish-owned enterprises and dwellings were then pillaged, soon followed by riots against the city's Jewish community. In the same year, the Jewish inhabitants, jointly with the city council representatives and burghers, lodged their complaints before John Albert in a private audience. John initially held the Jews in contempt and incarcerated leaders of the Jewish community; but was persuaded by Callimachus to release them shortly after. According to Byron Sherwin, instrumental in coercing the king was a Jewish woman by the name of Rachel, who was the lady-in-waiting to Queen Mother Elizabeth. In 1495, John issued an edict whereby he expelled Jews from Kraków and forcibly relocated them in the adjacent township of Kazimierz, which became one of Poland's primary centres of Judaism. Chroniclers from the period make no mention of an expulsion; Marcin Kromer suggested that the relocation was in part voluntary and for the benefit of the Jews who faced persecution from Christians.

=== Intervention in Masovia, 1495–1496 ===
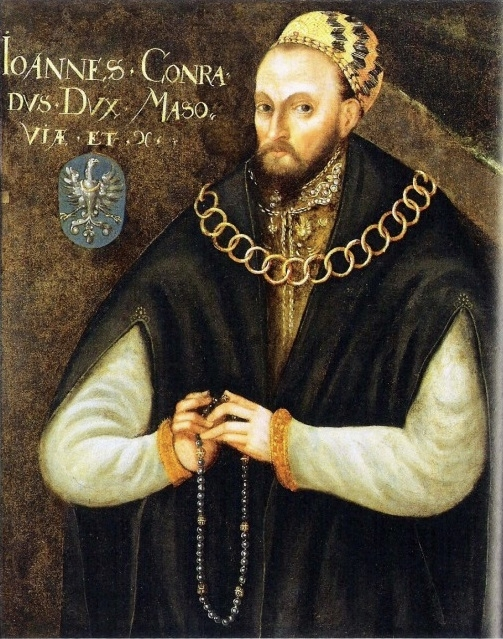
Konrad III Rudy, Duke of Masovia and John Albert's adversary

John desired to assert royal power over Poland's fiefdoms, most notably the Duchy of Masovia, whose Piast rulers held closer ties to the Gediminids and were allied with the Grand Duchy of Lithuania. The Jagiellonians perceived the duchy as a quasi-state and a "blot" on their absolute sovereignty over East-Central Europe. John was a staunch supporter of imposing Polonisation into Poland's spheres of influence, including Masovia and Monastic Prussia.

When Duke Janusz II died heirless in February 1495, his brother Konrad hurried to secure his disputed succession by sending out troops to fortify Masovian castles. He failed in deterring Polish ambitions; John soon assembled a small force that marched into Masovia and occupied the ecclesiastical city of Płock, the region's primary bishopric. Cardinal Frederick then prevented local canons from obtaining office and installed Jan Lubrański as bishop. Fearing an escalation, Konrad ordered his men to stand down; paving the way for the Jagiellons to uphold their claim to Masovia. A year later, Konrad paid homage to John at Piotrków; where, on accusations of insubordination, he was deprived of most holdings and hereditary possessions.

=== Invasion of Moldavia, 1497–1499 ===
John desired to pose as the champion of Christendom against the Ottoman Turks, whilst regaining lost ports near the Black Sea (Cetatea Albă and Chilia) and strengthening suzerainty over Moldavia. His primary objective was to forcibly install his younger brother, Sigismund, on the Moldavian throne. Circumstances seemed, moreover, to favour the Poles. In his brother Vladislaus, he found a counterpoise to the machinations of Emperor Maximilian I, who in 1492 had concluded an alliance against him with Ivan III of Russia. As suzerain of Moldavia, John Albert was favourably situated for attacking the Turks. At the conference of Lőcse (1494), the details of the expedition were arranged between the kings of Poland and Hungary and Elector John Cicero of Brandenburg. However, John's plan to dethrone Stephen III in favour of Sigismund was met with staunch resistance from the Hungarians.

In May 1496, John raised civil taxes to finance the forthcoming campaign. The true motive behind his personal crusade was concealed, and all religious dimensions were excluded. In turn, national defence and preventing an Ottoman incursion were chosen as the most suitable cause. This false narrative was conveyed to the people through tax proclamations. In August 1497, tax levies equivalent to 25 per cent of ecclesiastical incomes were demanded from the clergy by Frederick Cardinal Jagiellon to support his brother. By the summer of 1497, John assembled a strong army numbering some 80,000 men, supported by heavy artillery. Stephen III attempted to prevent John and the Poles from crossing into Moldavia. Endorsed by Ivan III, he persuaded John's brother Alexander not to partake in the campaign. As reported by the Bychowiec Chronicle, the Lithuanian nobles condemned Poland's actions and refused to set foot on Moldavian territory.

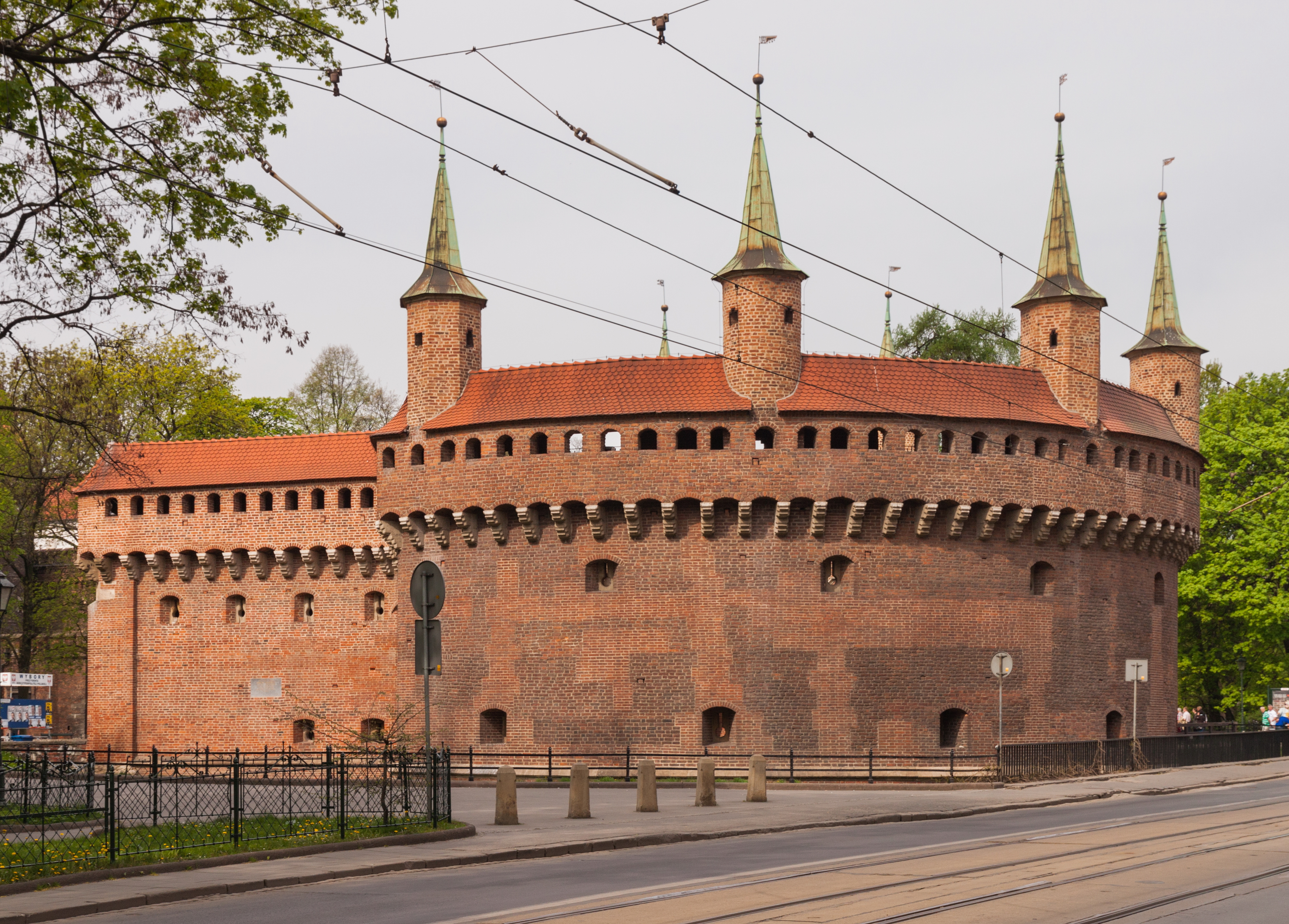
John ordered the construction of the Kraków Barbican, fearing an Ottoman-instigated retaliatory attack.

The Polish army marched across the river Dniester and invaded Moldavia in August 1497. The Ottoman Sultan then sent reinforcements of about 600 men mostly comprising Janissaries who joined Stephen's forces stationed at Roman (now in Romania). His final attempts to halt the Polish advance proved futile. The Moldavian chancellor, sent on a peacekeeping mission to the Polish camp, tried to convince the Poles to withdraw from the country; but John refused and had him confined. The unsuccessful attack on Suceava lasting from 24 September to 19 October curtailed John's ambitions. The Polish army had its supply lines disrupted by the Moldavian forces and suffered from disease which forced John into bed. The siege of Suceava was lifted after Vladislaus sent a Hungarian army counting some 12,000 men to help Stephen. A truce was signed. At the Battle of the Cosmin Forest in Bukovina, the Moldavians routed the retreating Poles, whose heavy cavalry was unable to charge in thick woodland. The attack led to significant casualties, disorder and a loss of prestige for the Polish army. John eventually agreed to a humiliating peace treaty in 1499 and recognised Stephen as his equal and not as a feudal dependent.

The defeat in Moldavia incited raids into Polish territory, largely conducted by Tatars and other irregulars. In July 1498, Turkish marauders of Malkoçoğlu Bali Bey crossed into Podolia and reached as far west as Lwów, pillaging the city's environs. Fearing a retaliatory attack by the Moldavians or the Ottoman Empire, John ordered the construction of new defensive fortifications; including what became one of Poland's most recognisable monuments, the Kraków Barbican.

=== Dispute with Teutonic Knights, 1499–1501 ===
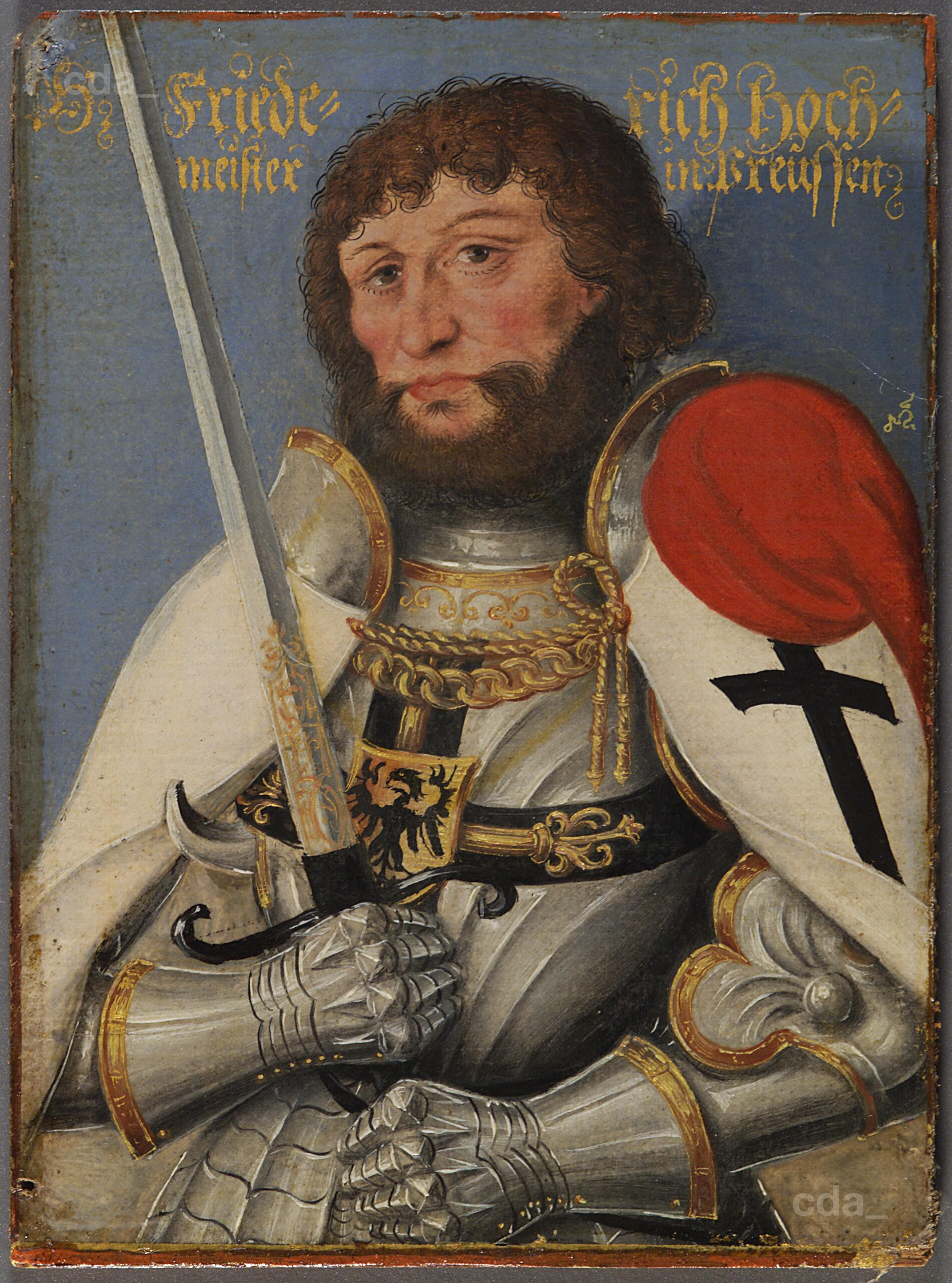
Frederick of Saxony, Grandmaster of the Teutonic Order, who refused to pay homage to John. Portrait by Lucas Cranach the Younger

The ceding of Prussia to Poland as a royal dependency in the aftermath of the Thirteen Years' War (1454–1466) caused great animosity between the Teutonic State and the Polish Crown, even when the two were allies. Tensions escalated further when John tried to secure his brother Frederick as Watzenrode's successor in the Holy See.

After the death of Johann von Tiefen, the Teutonic Order proclaimed Frederick of Saxony as the new Grand Master. Unlike his predecessor, Friedrich disregarded the Second Peace of Thorn of 1466 and refused to render homage to the Polish Crown. In 1499, he rejected John's request to partake in a Sejm sitting at Piotrków, claiming that his absence stemmed from troubled domestic affairs. He then referred the matter to the Imperial Diet. Maximilian I, Holy Roman Emperor, permitted Friedrich to aid Poland when called, but insisted that he refrains from searing oath of allegiance to the Polish king, instead maintaining "friendly" and "neighbourly" relations.

According to Jędrzej Moraczewski, John demanded on five occasions that the Teutonic Knights pledge reverence and submission. When Maximilian denounced the Peace of Thorn, asserting that neither the Empire nor the Holy See approved it, John mobilised a force with heavy artillery and set out to Toruń in 1501 where the accords were initially signed. Friedrich dismissed the ultimatum to appear before John but sent representatives on his behalf to negotiate. Fearing a major regional conflict, George, Duke of Saxony, and John's brother-in-law by marriage to Barbara Jagiellon, entrusted the Catholic Bishop of Meissen with mediating between the Poles and the Teutonic Knights. However, the negotiations stalled when John died unexpectedly.

== Death and burial ==
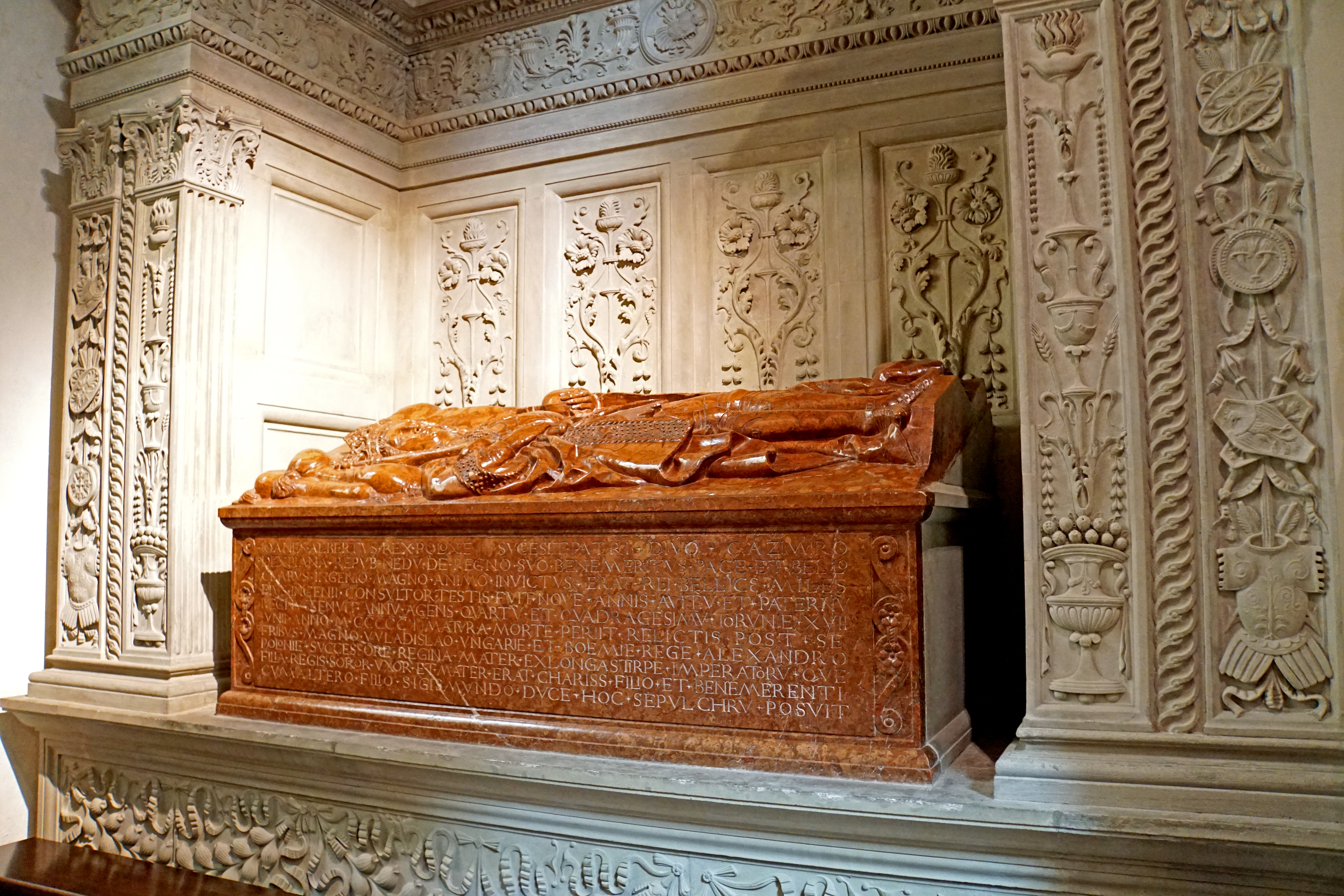
John's tomb at Wawel Cathedral is the first and earliest example of Renaissance architecture in Poland.

The catastrophic Moldavian Campaign was a major blunder that psychologically scarred John for life and likely affected his health. He died suddenly on 17 June 1501 in Toruń, where he agreed to negotiate with the Teutonic Knights. The most likely cause of death was syphilis, though the monarch suffered from other ailments and battle wounds. The king's body was embalmed for the journey, and on 29 June, the funeral cortège left Toruń for the royal capital of Kraków. His heart was embedded inside the Toruń Cathedral, but its exact location remains unknown.

John was laid to rest on 28 July 1501 at Wawel Cathedral in Kraków, in one of the dedicated chapels adjacent to the cathedral's nave. The Late Gothic red-marble headstone with the king's effigy and ledger was sculpted by Stanisław Stwosz, the son of Veit Stoss. From 1502 to 1505, Francesco Fiorentino created an Early Renaissance niche and archway, based on Leonardo Bruni's tomb at the Basilica of Santa Croce in Florence. The tomb's resemblance to a triumphal arch was said to be an allusion to the imperial pretensions of John and the Jagiellonian dynasty in general. It is widely regarded as the first Renaissance composition in Poland and a breakthrough in Polish architecture.

== Personal life and assessment ==
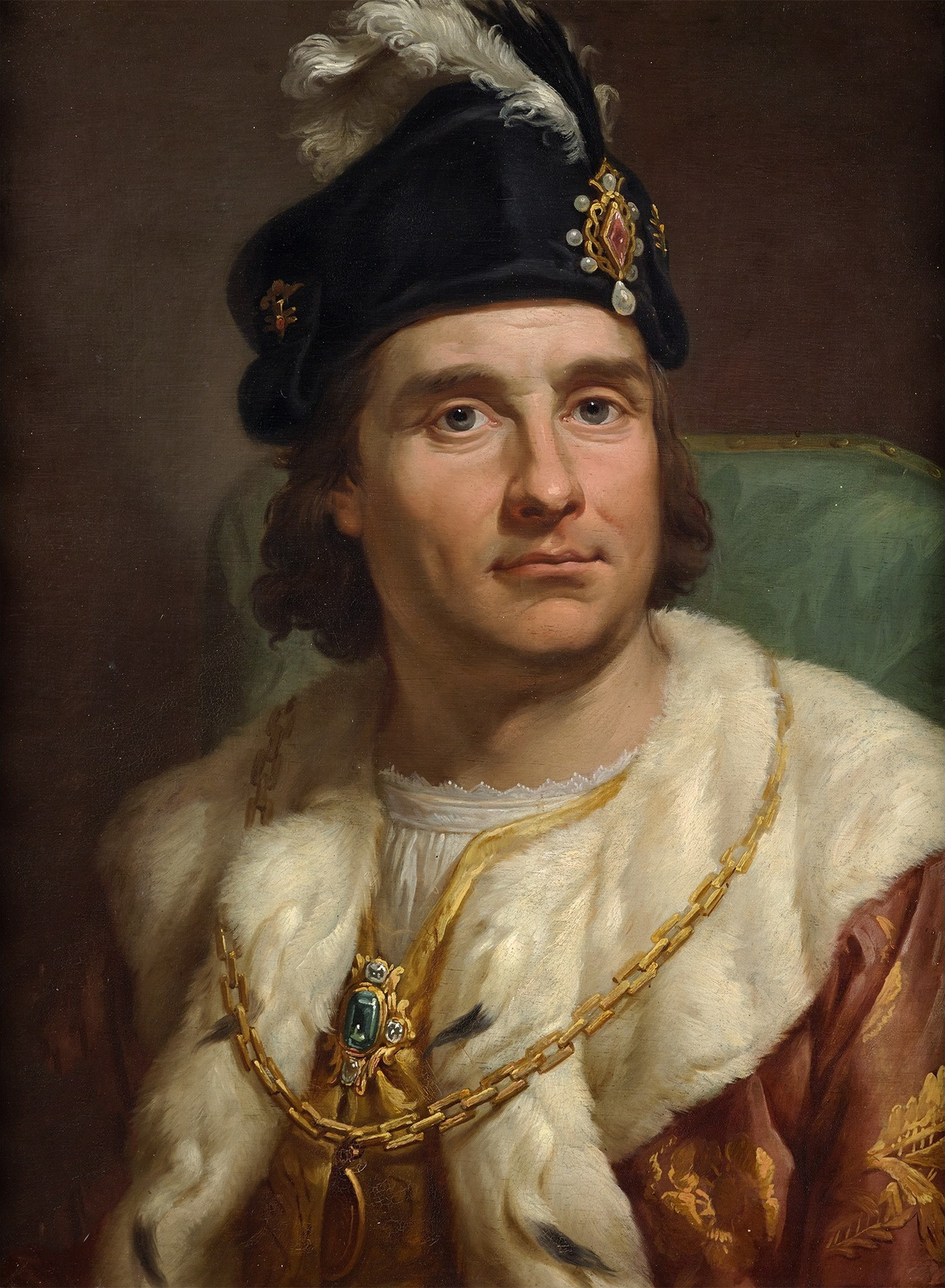
An 18th-century portrait of John by Marcello Bacciarelli

Unlike Alexander, John was not easily swayed and held firm views on the matters of state. 19th-century historians called him a "valiant soldier, but no commander". Józef Ignacy Kraszewski emphasized the king's interest in militarism and absolutism, which stemmed from his education supervised by the radical Callimachus. To win support for the Moldavian Campaign, John was compelled to appease the nobility. In 1496, the townspeople were forbidden to own land, and the freedom of movement for peasants was abolished. The nobles would profit from the non-migrating peasants tied to the land and serfdom-based manorial estates called folwarks. This greatly hindered the development of Polish towns and cities in comparison with their Western European counterparts, and resulted in low urbanisation rates across the country.

John never married and remained a lifelong bachelor. It is uncertain whether he fathered any illegitimate children; it is evident that the king was a libertine who led a promiscuous life. Even during his lifetime, John was known to be a notorious womaniser and a dissolute. Maciej Miechowita writes that he "indulged in [sexual] pleasures and desires like a warrior", and Marcin Kromer noted his "insistence on carnal and affectionless love". Kromer did point out his ambition, occasional wit, and intelligence. He was known to be shrewd and gifted in languages, which assisted him in diplomacy. Privately, he enjoyed banqueting, hunting, and frequent drinking, which encouraged chroniclers to brand him as a drunkard. Accounts of John strolling intoxicated in the alleyways of Kraków; and engaging in public brawls cannot be substantially justified due to the lack of evidence.

During their encounter, Miechowita described John as "tall, brown-eyed, with reddish skin on the face […] he was quick in movement and girded with a smallsword".

John's unconventionally large court was the biggest of any Polish monarch: it numbered around 1,600 knights and courtiers.

== Ancestry ==
Ancestors of John I Albert

8. Algirdas
4. Władysław II Jagiełło (Jogaila)
9. Uliana of Tver
2. Casimir IV Jagiellon
10. Andrew Olshansky
5. Sophia of Halshany
11. Aleksandra Drucka
1. John I Albert
12. Albert IV, Duke of Austria
6. Albert II of Germany
13. Joanna Sophia of Bavaria
3. Elizabeth of Austria
14. Sigismund, Holy Roman Emperor
7. Elizabeth of Luxembourg
15. Barbara of Cilli

=== Family tree ===
Władysław II Jagiełło (Jogaila)	Sophia of Halshany	Albert II of Germany	Elizabeth of Luxembourg
Władysław III of Poland	Casimir IV	Elizabeth of Austria	Ladislaus the Posthumous	Anne, Duchess of Luxembourg
Vladislaus II of Hungary	John I Albert	Alexander I	Sigismund I	Bona Sforza
Louis II of Hungary	Sigismund II Augustus

== See also ==
- History of Poland (1385–1569)
- Piotrków Statutes

John I Albert House of Jagiellon Born: 27 December 1459 Died: 17 June 1501
Regnal titles
Preceded by Casimir IV	King of Poland; 1492–1501	Succeeded by Alexander
Preceded by János Corvinus	Duke of Głogów; 1491–1498	Succeeded by Sigismund
