= Friedrich Georg Wilhelm Struve Monument =

1969 sculpture in Tartu to F G W Struve

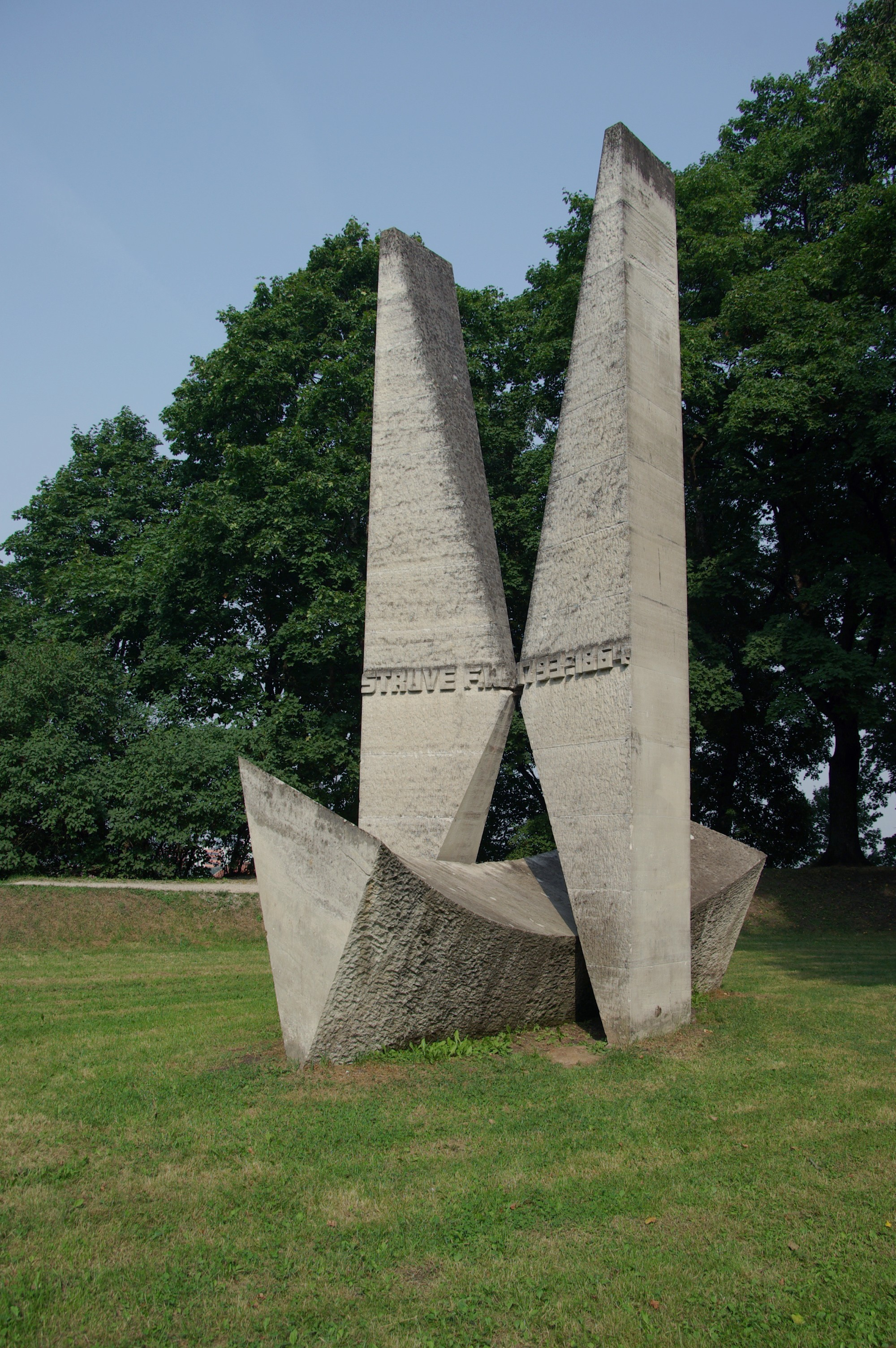
- Struve Monument in Toome Hill Park, Tartu
- interactive map of Struve Monument, Tartu
- Location: Tartu, Estonia
- Coordinates: 58°22′43.6″N 26°43′12.2″E
- Designer: Olav Männi, Udo Ivask
- Material: Dolomite (Saaremaa)
- Height: 8 m (26 ft)
- Opening date: 1969
- Dedicated to: Friedrich Georg Wilhelm Struve

The Friedrich Georg Wilhelm Struve Monument was erected in 1969 on Toomemägi (Dome Hill) at Tartu, Estonia, in front of the University of Tartu Old Observatory. The concept and design of the sculpture were by two Estonians: sculptor Olav Männi and architect Udo Ivask.

Friedrich Georg Wilhelm Struve served as director of Dorpat Observatory and later as director of Pulkovo Observatory. In 1824 he brought the largest refracting telescope of its time, the Fraunhofer refractor, to Tartu. He initiated the trigonometrical surveys for calculating the flattening of the Earth at the poles, later known as the Struve Geodetic Arc. His research focused on double stars. In 1847 he hypothesised that light is absorbed in interstellar space (extinction), a phenomenon scientifically confirmed in the 1930s.

The 8-metre-high monument consists of geometric forms made of dolomite from the island of Saaremaa. The inscription reads "STRUVE F.W. 1793–1864".

Ivask’s artistic work was influenced by architectural modernism and the Bauhaus movement, which emphasised functionality and minimal formal means.

The abstract design allows different interpretations:

- According to the City of Tartu’s heritage register, the lower part resembles a cylindrical sundial and the upper part an hourglass, symbolising humanity’s pursuit of knowledge about the universe.
- According to Estonian art historian Enriko Talvistu, the monument references the refraction of light inside a telescope tube, with the lower section representing the concave mirror surface of a telescope.
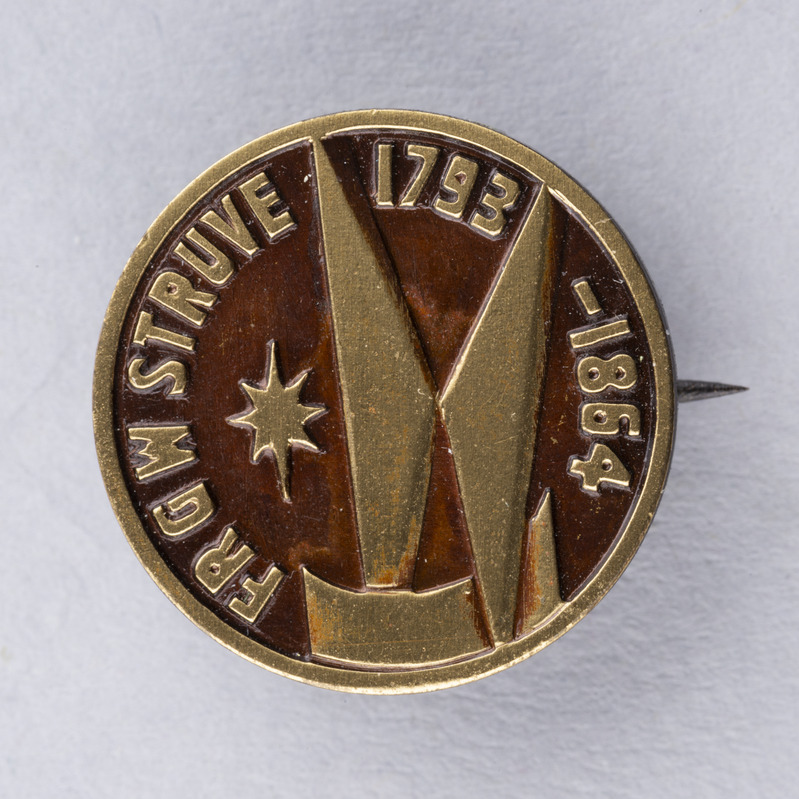
Struve monument as brooch

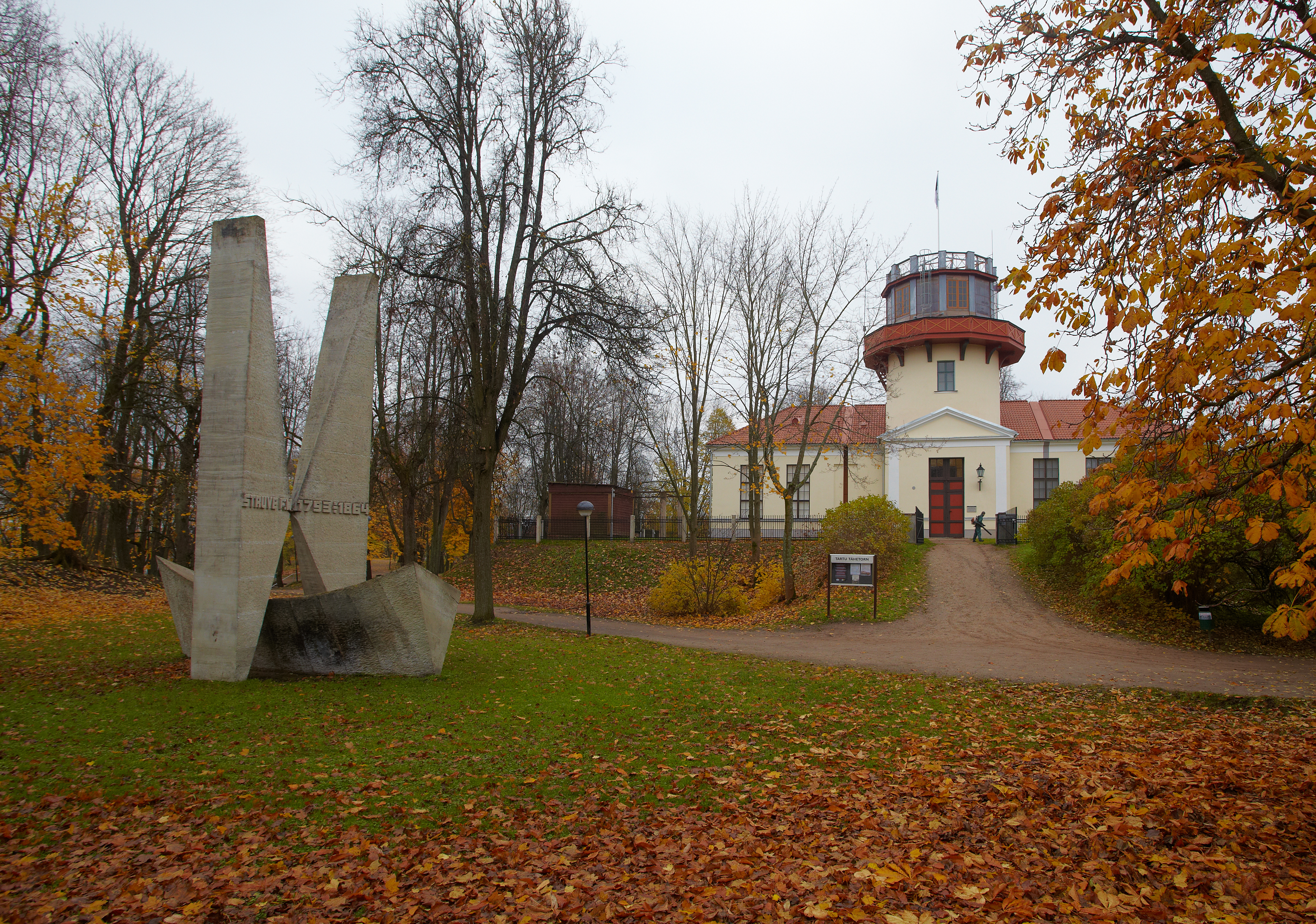
In front of Old Tartu Observatory

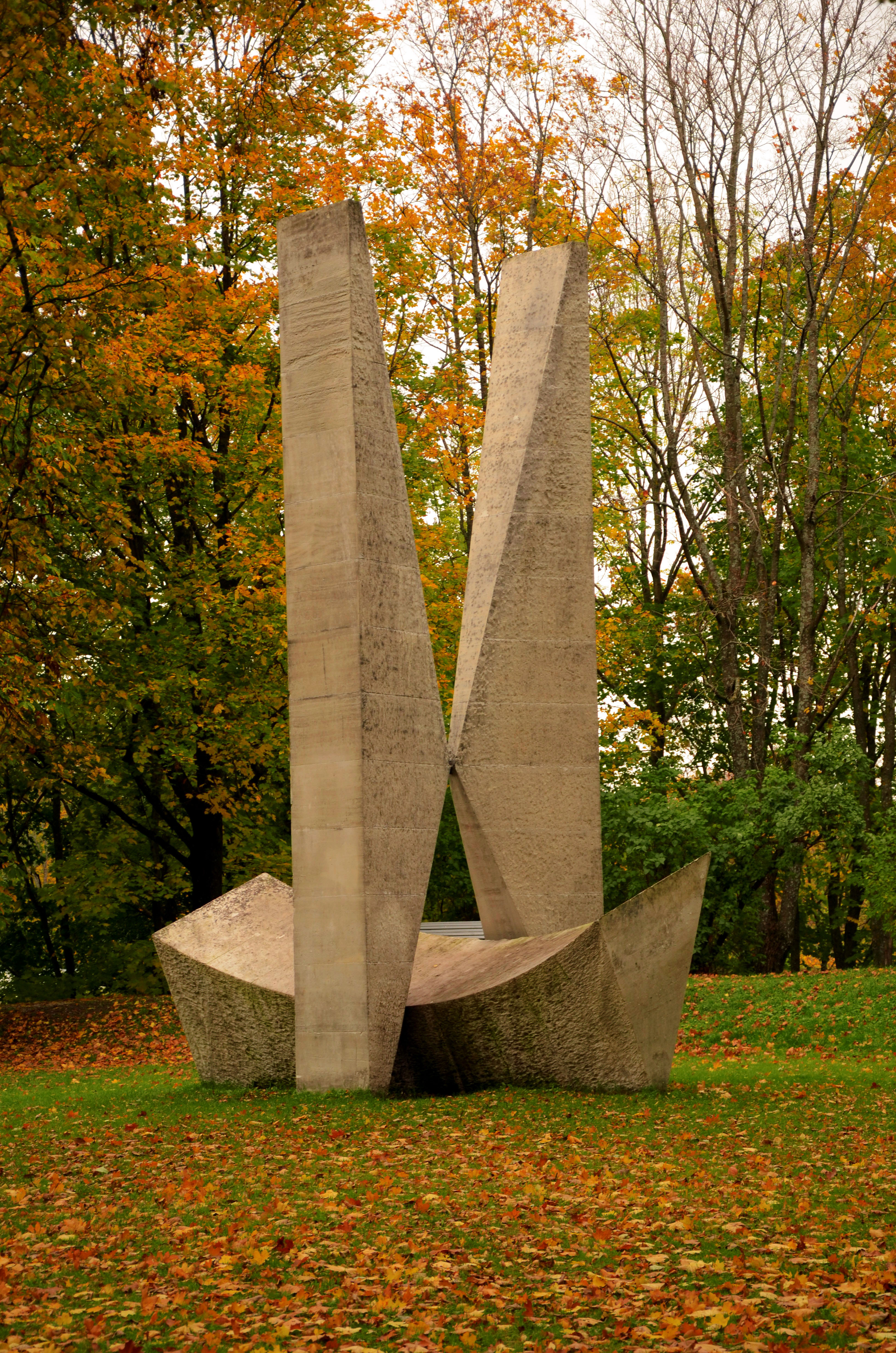
Reverse of monument
