= Rudi Geodetic Point =

- Punctul Geodezic Rudi
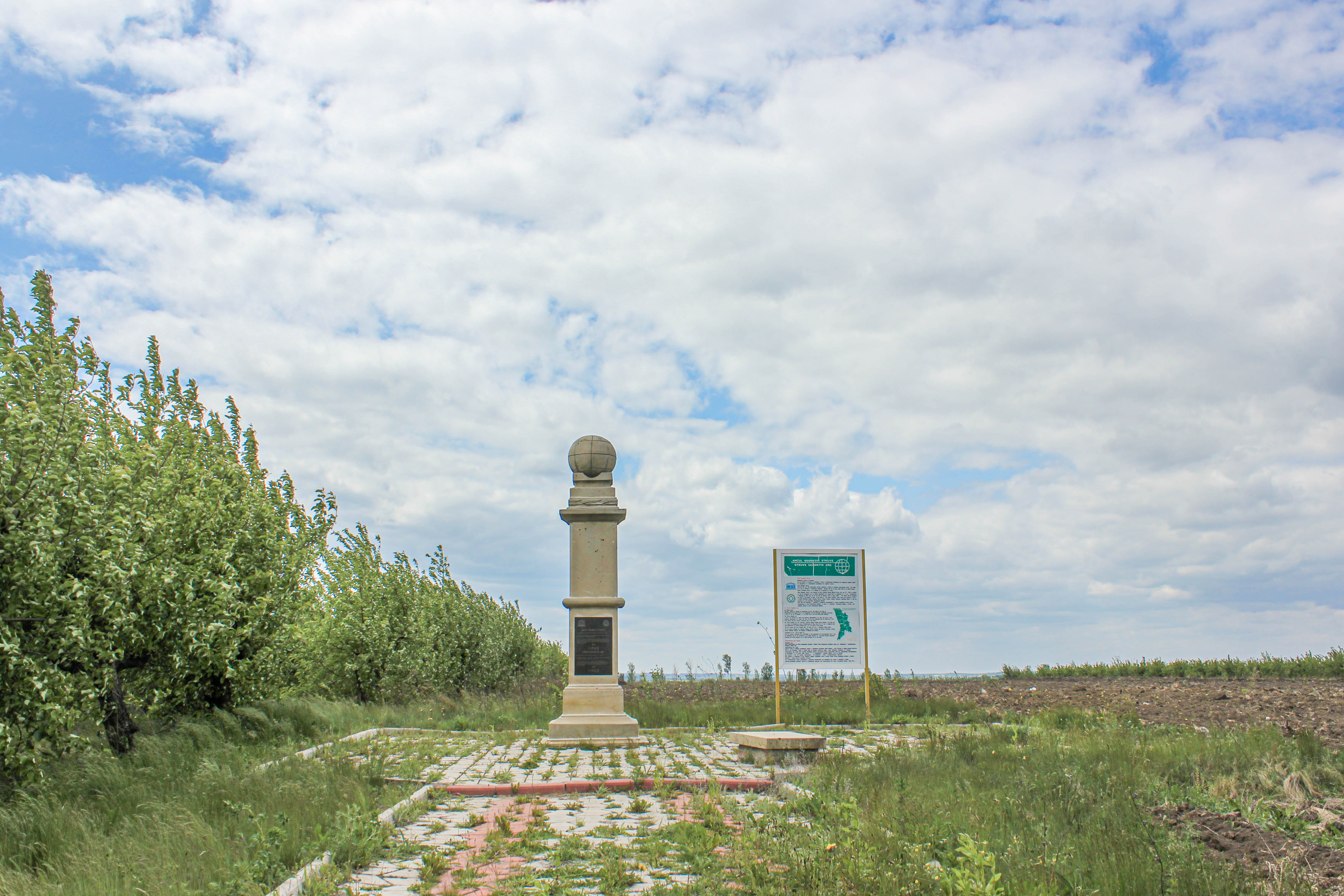
- Interactive map of Rudi Geodetic Point
- Coordinates: 48°19′08″N 27°52′36″E
- Type: Obelisk
- Opening date: June 17, 2006
- Dedicated to: Struve Geodetic Arc

The Rudi Geodetic Point (Romanian: Punctul Geodezic Rudi) is a point of the Struve Geodetic Arc in Rudi, Moldova. There is also an obelisk.

== Overview ==
Rudi Geodetic Point was set up in 1847 and is a World Heritage Site (2005). The obelisk was opened on June 17, 2006.

== Gallery ==
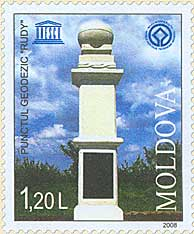

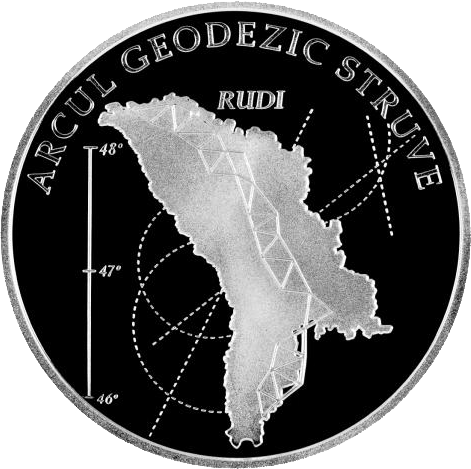
