= Taavet Rootsmäe =

Estonian astronomer

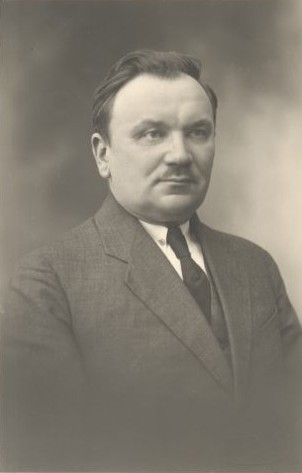
Taavet Rootsmäe

Taavet Rootsmäe (until 1936 David Rootsman; 27 June 1885 Tartu County – 27 June 1959 Tartu) was an Estonian astronomer.

In 1913 he graduated from Tartu University. Since 1919 he taught at Tartu University (was a professor).

From 1919 to 1948 he was the first head of University of Tartu Old Observatory.

His main fields of research were stellar astronomy, theoretical astronomy, and celestial mechanics. With Ernst Öpik, he is considered the founder of Estonian astronomy school.
