= Fuglenes Lighthouse =

Coastal lighthouse in Hammerfest, Norway

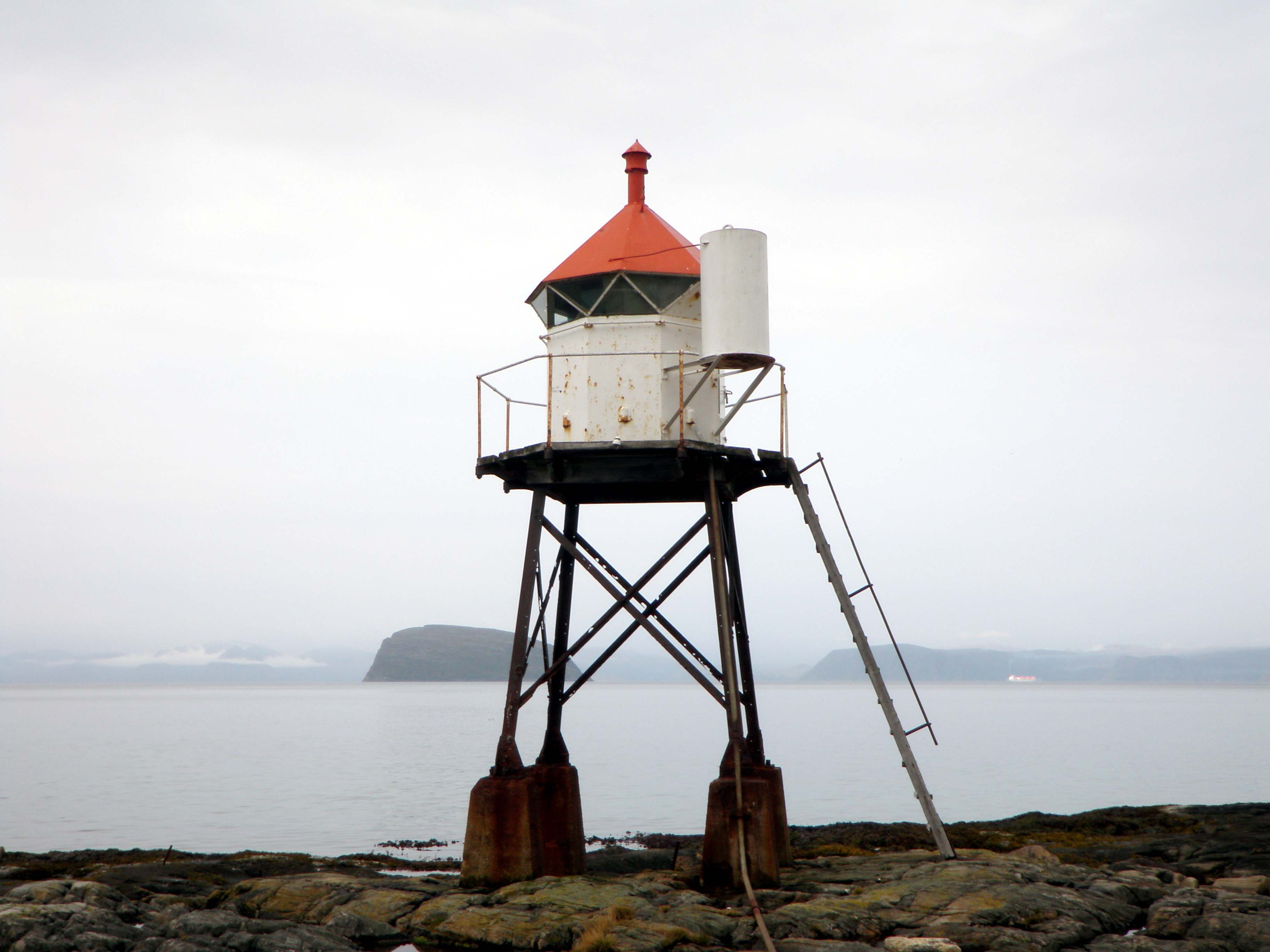
- Fuglenes light beacon in 2013
- Location: Fuglenes, Hammerfest, Finnmark, Norway
- Coordinates: 70.667160°N 23.654871°E

Tower
- Constructed: 1859 (first)
- Construction: metal skeletal tower
- Height: 5 metres (16 ft)
- Shape: square skeletal tower with balcony al lantern
- Markings: white lantern, red roof lantern

Light
- First lit: 1911
- Deactivated: 1911
- Focal height: 5 metres (16 ft)
- Range: 3 nmi (5.6 km; 3.5 mi) (white)
- Characteristic: Oc (2) WGR 8s.

Fuglenes Lighthouse (Norwegian: Fuglenes fyr) was a coastal lighthouse located in Hammerfest Municipality in Finnmark county, Norway. It was established in 1859, and deactivated in 1911, when it was replaced by an automated light.

== See also ==
- List of lighthouses in Norway
- Lighthouses in Norway
