= Jupukka =

Swedish mountain

Coordinates: 67.27710°N 23.24545°E

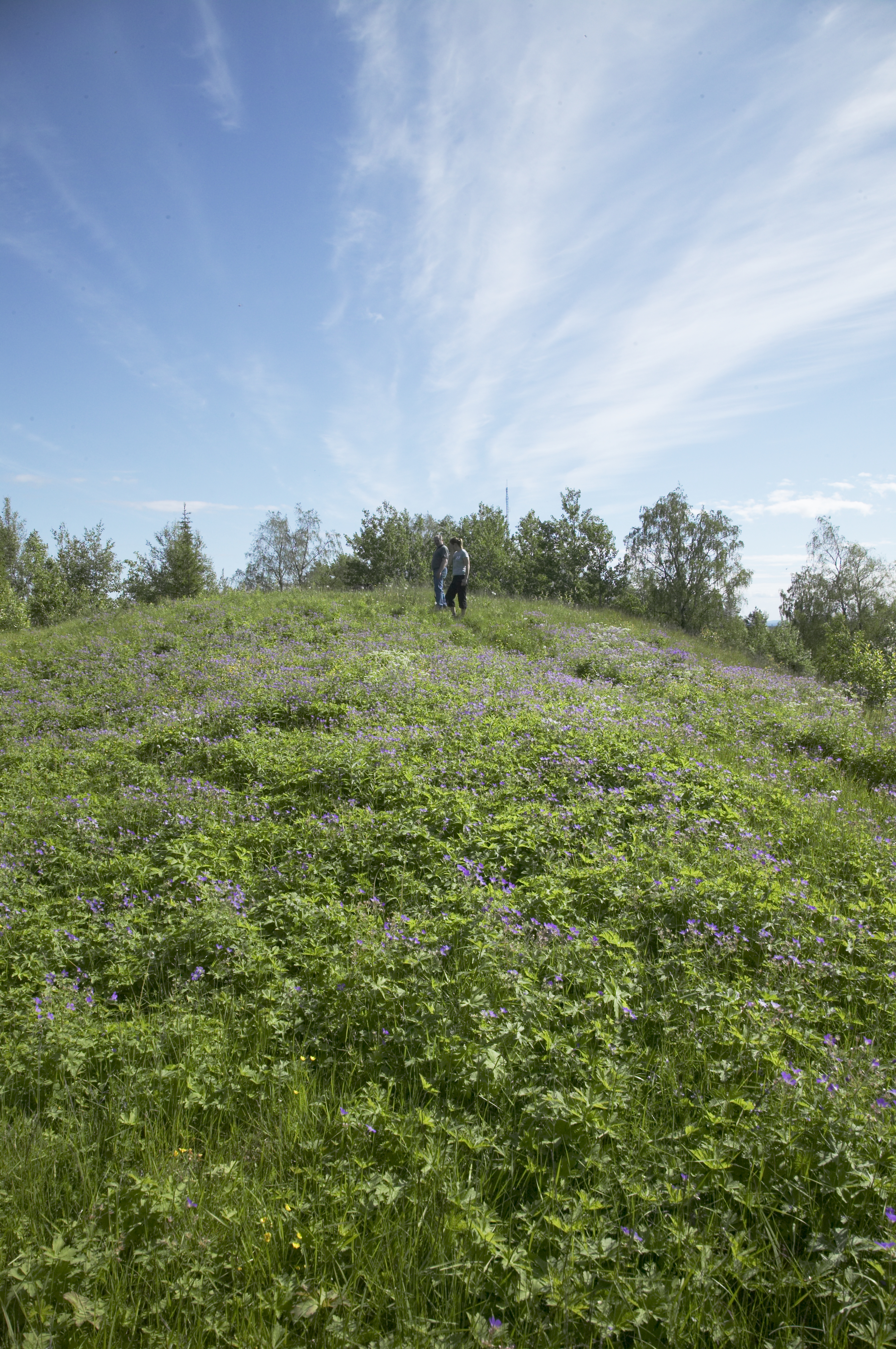
Summit of the Jupukka

Jupukka is a Swedish mountain north of Pajala in Swedish Lapland. Jupukka is 277 metres high. This mountain marks one of the locations for the Struve Geodetic Arc.
