= Școala Moldovenească =

Şcoala Moldovenească
- Editor: Onisifor Ghibu
- Staff writers: Vasile Secarî
- Categories: History
- Founded: 1917
- Final issue: 1918
- Country: Russia, Gubernia Bessarabia
- Based in: Chişinău
- Language: Moldavian

Şcoala Moldovenească (English: The Moldovan School) was a magazine from Chişinău, Bessarabia, founded in May 1917 by Onisifor Ghibu. It was the successor of Cuvînt moldovenesc

== Bibliography ==
- Georgeta Răduică, Dicţionarul presei româneşti (1731–1918), Editura Ştiinţifică, București, ISBN 973-44-0123-8
