= Tynnyrilaki =

Mountain in Sweden

Coordinates: 68°15′18″N 22°58′58″E

Tynnyrilaki is a 445-meter-high (1,460-foot) mountain 120 km E. of Kiruna, Sweden. It's the highest point of an area called Pingisvaara. This mountain marks one of the locations for the Struve Geodetic Arc.
