= Nicolae Secară =

Bessarabian politician (1894–1942)

Nicolae Sacară (Secară)

Member of the Moldovan Parliament
- In office 1917–1918

Personal details
- Born: 19 May 1894 Rudi, Soroca
- Died: 24 February 1942 (aged 47) Penza

Nicolae Sacară (Secară) (Rudi, 19 May 1894 – Penza, 24 February 1942) was a Bessarabian politician.

== Biography ==
He served as Member of the Moldovan Parliament (1917–1918).

== Gallery ==
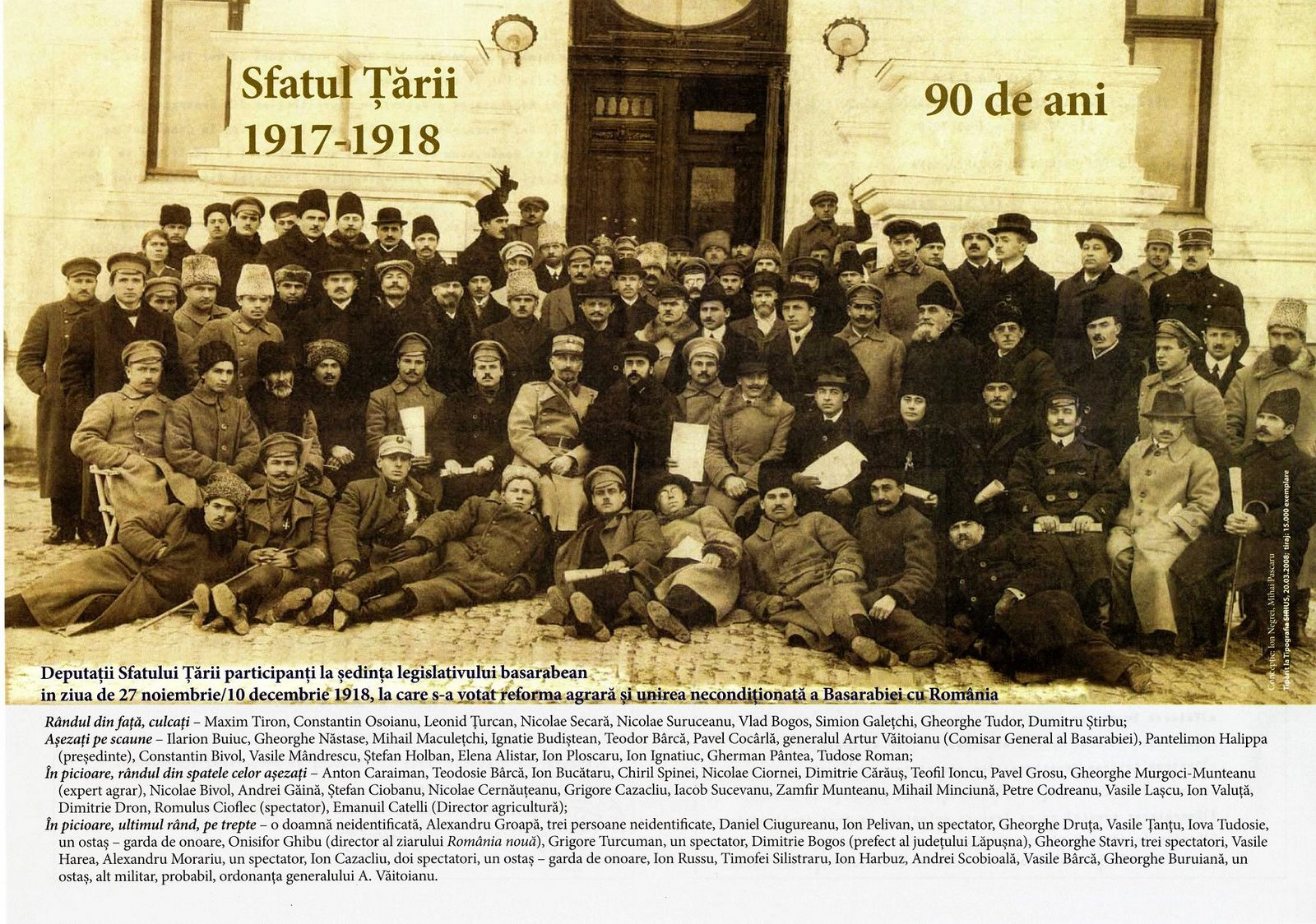
Sfatul Țării Palace, Dec 10, 1918

Moldovan stamp, 1998

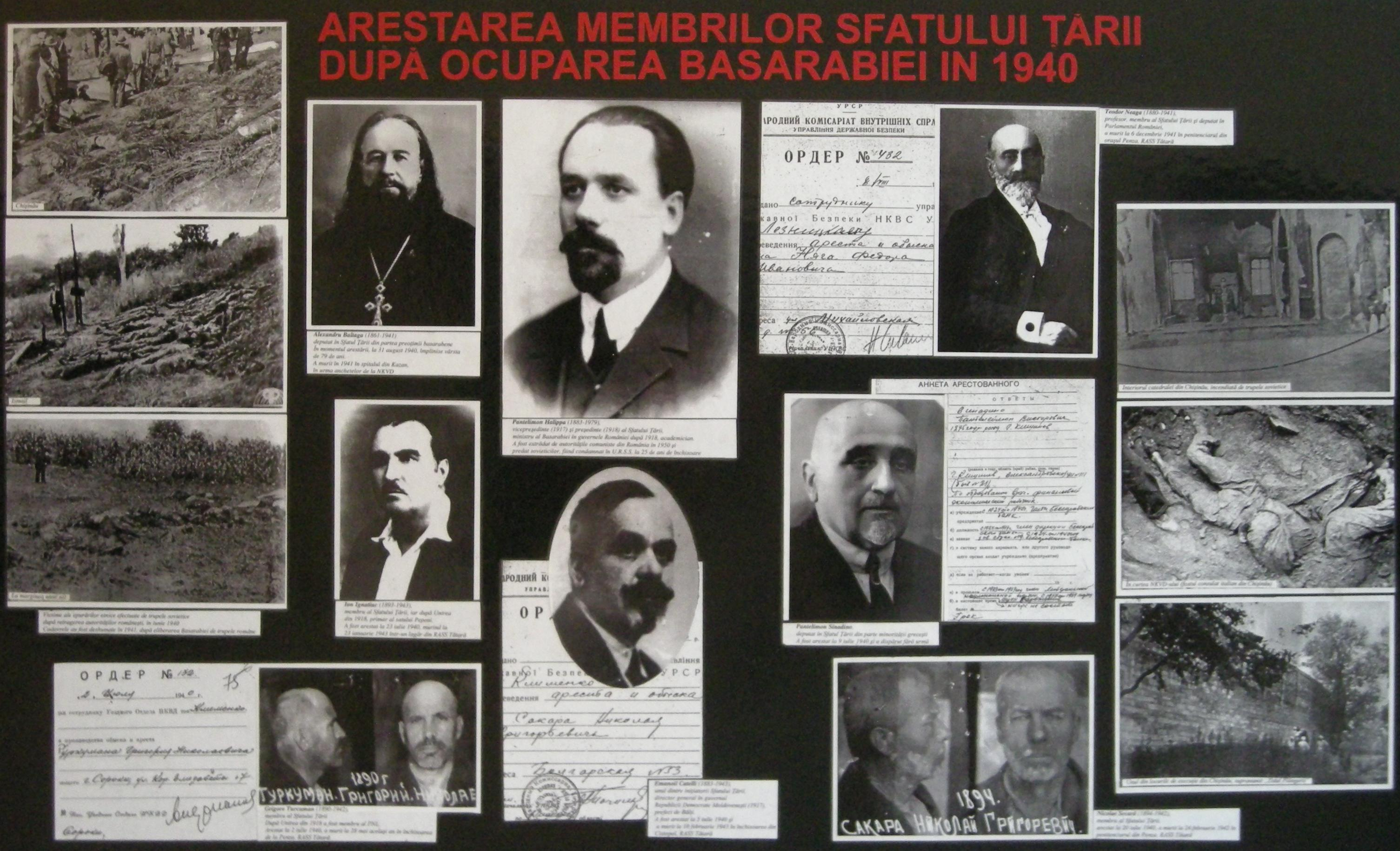
Persecutions against Sfatul Țării members
