= Vasile Săcară =

Romanian politician (1881–1938)

- Born: April 6, 1881; Rudi, Soroca
- Died: October 7, 1938 (aged 57); Soroca
- Citizenship: Romania
- Occupations: Politician, Teacher
- Known for: his activity as a politician
- Parent: Grigore I. Secară

Vasile Săcară (April 6, 1881 – October 7, 1938) was a Romanian politician, journalist, author, and teacher from Soroca, Bessarabia.

In 1917, Vasile Săcară co-founded the magazine Şcoala Moldovenească and formed "Obştea învăţătorilor din Basarabia". He served as a member of the Chamber of Deputies of Romania (1918–1923) and became the first prefect of Soroca County (1923 – September 1924), after which he retired from politics.

== Awards ==
- Ordinul Coroana României în grad de cavaler (1930)
- Medalia Ferdinand I cu spade şi panglică (1932)
