= Struve Geodetic Arc =

Meridian arc from Hammerfest in Norway to the Black Sea

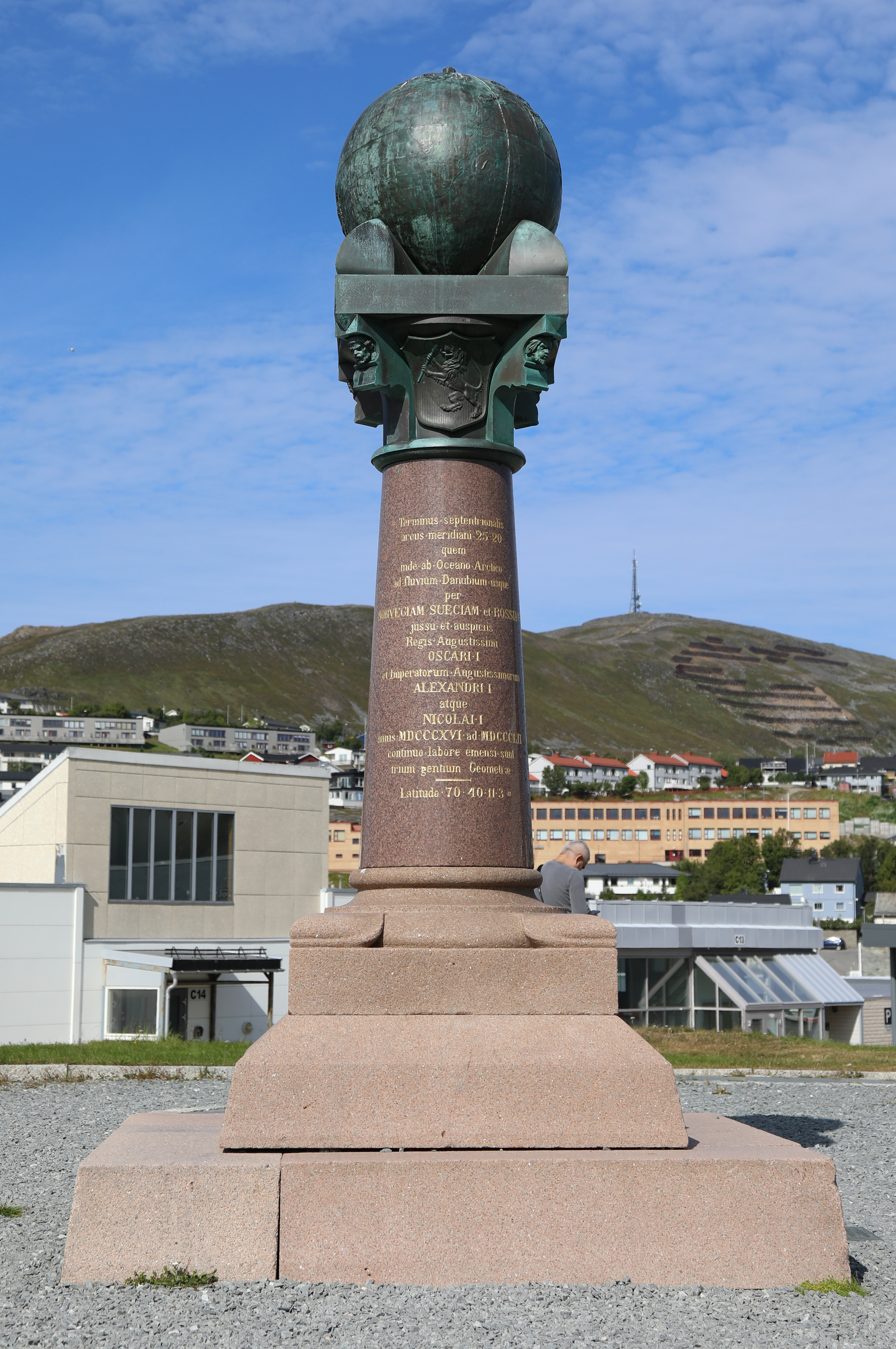
- The northernmost station of the Struve Geodetic Arc is located in Fuglenes, Norway.

- Map of the Struve Geodetic Arc where red points identify the World Heritage Sites.

General information
- Type: Ensemble of memorable sites
- Location: Estonia, Belarus, Finland, Latvia, Lithuania, Norway, Moldova, Russia, Sweden, and Ukraine
- Coordinates: 59°3′28″N 26°20′16″E
- Opened: Geodetic Arc

Design and construction
- Architect: Friedrich Georg Wilhelm von Struve

UNESCO World Heritage Site
- Official name: Struve Geodetic Arc
- Criteria: ii, iii, vi
- Reference: 1187
- Inscription: 2005 (29th Session)

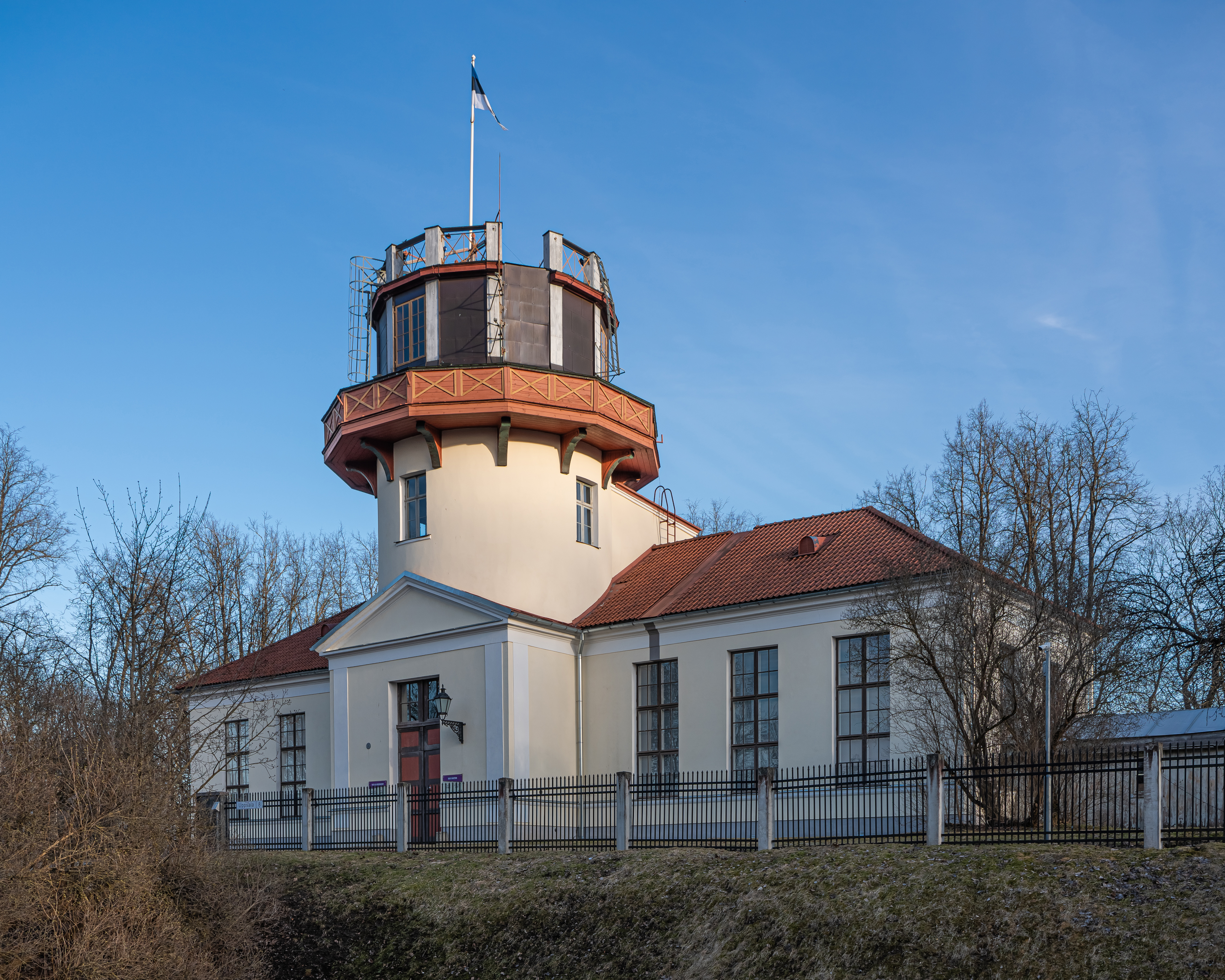
Tartu Old Observatory, the first point of the arc.

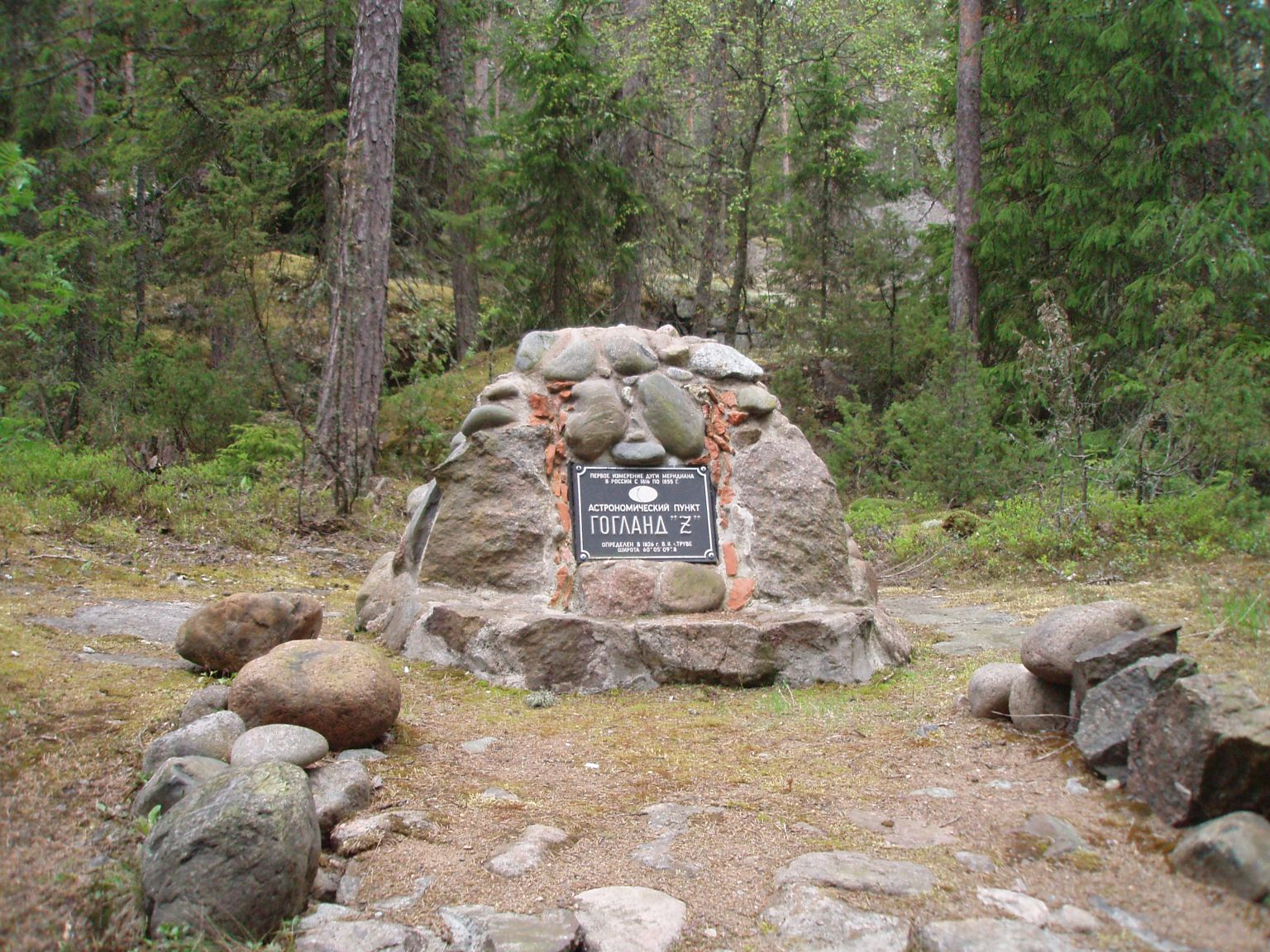
Point Z, situated on Hogland, Russia.

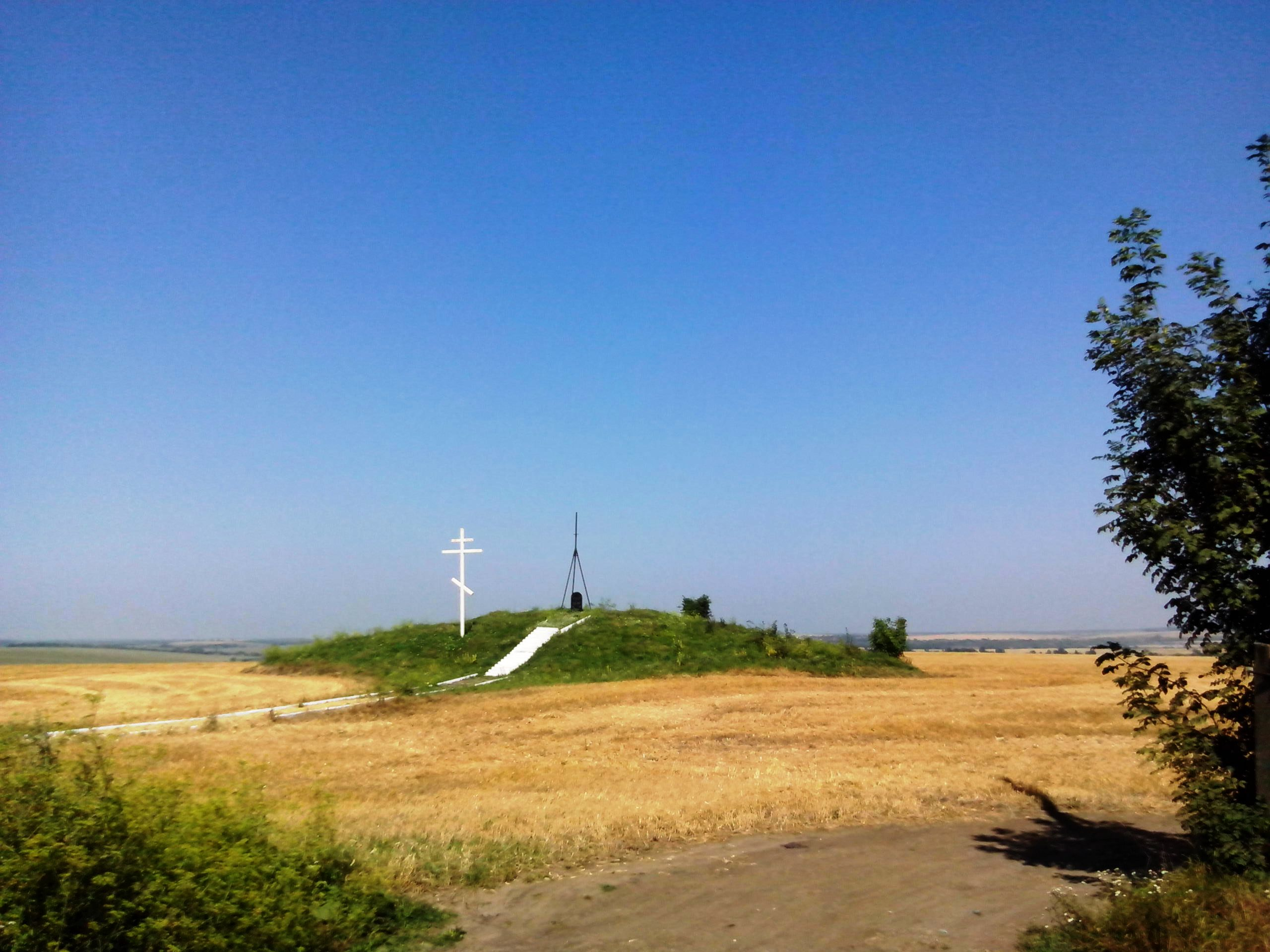
The commemorative plaque of the arc in Felshtyn, Ukraine

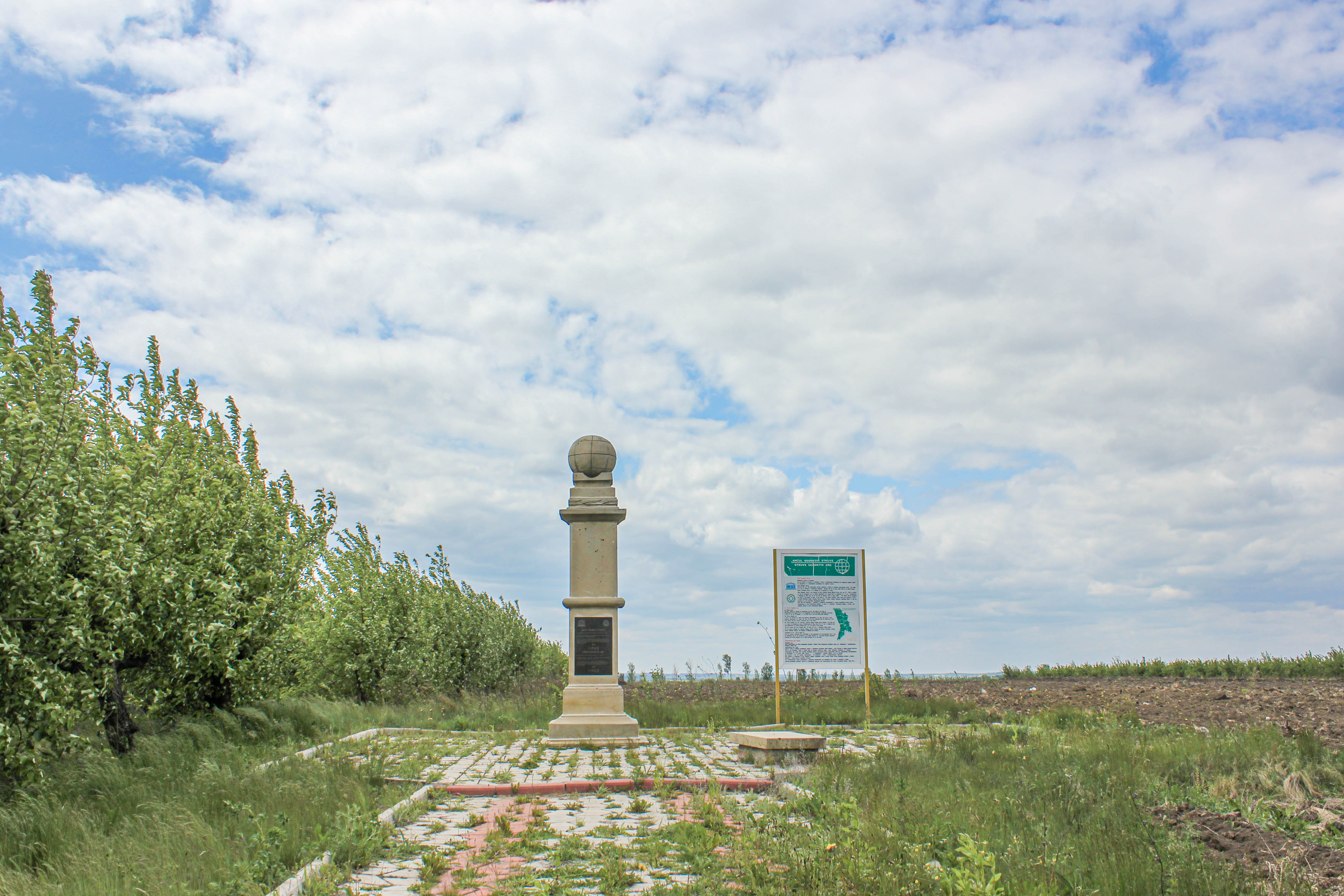
The Geodetic Point in Rudi, Moldova

The Struve Geodetic Arc is a chain of survey triangulations stretching from Hammerfest in Norway to the Black Sea, through ten countries and over 2,820 kilometres (1,750 mi), which yielded the first accurate meridian arc measurement.

The chain was established and used by the German-born Russian scientist Friedrich Georg Wilhelm von Struve in the years 1816 to 1855 to establish the size and shape of the Earth. At that time, the chain passed merely through three countries: Norway, Sweden and the Russian Empire. The Arc's first point is located in Tartu Observatory in Estonia, where Struve conducted much of his research. Measurement of the triangulation chain comprises 258 main triangles and 265 geodetic vertices. The northernmost point is located near Hammerfest in Norway and the southernmost point near the Black Sea in Ukraine.

In 2005, the chain was inscribed on the World Heritage List, because of its importance in geodesy and its testimony to international scientific cooperation. The World Heritage site includes 34 commemorative plaques or built obelisks out of the original 265 main station points which are marked by drilled holes in rock, iron crosses, cairns, others. This inscription is located in ten countries, the second most of any UNESCO World Heritage after the Ancient and Primeval Beech Forests of the Carpathians and Other Regions of Europe.

The measurements of the 30° Meridian Arc in 1816–1852 as well the description of the geodesic, topographical, and map making works in the Balkans from the nineteenth century until the beginning of the twentieth century by Russian Czarist Army was described in Astronomy, geodesy and map-drawing in Moldova since the middle ages till the World War I.

== Chain ==
=== Norway ===
- Fuglenes in Hammerfest (70°40′12″N 23°39′48″E)
- Raipas in Alta (69°56′19″N 23°21′37″E)
- Luvdiidcohkka in Kautokeino (69°39′52″N 23°36′08″E)
- Baelljasvarri in Kautokeino (69°01′43″N 23°18′19″E)

=== Sweden ===
- "Pajtas-vaara" (Tynnyrilaki) in Kiruna (68°15′18″N 22°58′59″E)
- "Kerrojupukka" (Jupukka) in Pajala (67°16′36″N 23°14′35″E)
- Pullinki in Övertorneå (66°38′47″N 23°46′55″E)
- "Perra-vaara" (Perävaara) in Haparanda (66°1′5″N 23°55′21″E)

=== Finland ===
- Stuor-Oivi (currently Stuorrahanoaivi) in Enontekiö (68°40′57″N 22°44′45″E)
- Avasaksa (currently Aavasaksa) in Ylitornio (66°23′52″N 23°43′31″E)
- Torneå (currently Alatornio Church) in Tornio (65°49′48″N 24°09′26″E)
- Puolakka (currently Oravivuori) in Korpilahti (61°55′36″N 25°32′01″E)
- Porlom II (currently Tornikallio) in Lapinjärvi (60°42′17″N 26°00′12″E)
- Svartvira (currently Mustaviiri) in Pyhtää (60°16′35″N 26°36′12″E)

=== Russia ===
- "Mäki-päälys" (Mäkipäällys) (Finland 1917/1920-1940) in Gogland (Suursaari)(60°4′27″N 26°58′11″E)
- "Hogland, Z" (Gogland, Tochka Z) in Gogland (60°5′9.8″N 26°57′37.5″E)

=== Estonia ===
- "Woibifer" (Võivere) in Väike-Maarja Parish (59°03′28″N 26°20′16″E)
- "Katko" (Simuna) in Väike-Maarja Parish (59°02′54″N 26°24′51″E)
- "Dorpat" (Tartu Old Observatory) in Tartu. (58°22′43.64″N 26°43′12.61″E)

=== Latvia ===
- "Sestu-Kalns" (Ziestu) in Ērgļu novads (56°50′24″N 25°38′12″E)
- "Jacobstadt" in Jēkabpils (56°30′05″N 25°51′24″E)

=== Lithuania ===
- "Karischki" (Gireišiai) by Panemunėlis southwards (55°54′09″N 25°26′12″E)
- "Meschkanzi" (Meškonys) in Nemenčinė (54°55′51″N 25°19′00″E)
- "Beresnäki" (Paliepiukai) in Nemėžis (54°38′04″N 25°25′45″E)

=== Belarus ===
- "Tupischki" (Tupishki) in Ashmyany district (54°17′30″N 26°2′43″E)
- "Lopati" (Lopaty) in Zelva district (53°33′38″N 24°52′11″E)
- "Ossownitza" (Ossovnitsa) in Ivanovo district (52°17′22″N 25°38′58″E)
- "Tchekutsk" (Chekutsk) in Ivanovo district (52°12′28″N 25°33′23″E)
- "Leskowitschi" (Leskovichi) in Ivanovo district (52°9′39″N 25°34′17″E)

=== Moldova ===
- "Rudi" (in von Struve's spelling: "Rudy") near Rudi village, Soroca district (48°19′08″N 27°52′36″E)

=== Ukraine ===
- Katerynivka in Antonivka, Khmelnytskyi Oblast (49°33′57″N 26°45′22″E)
- Felshtyn in Hvardiiske, Khmelnytskyi Oblast (49°19′48″N 26°40′55″E)
- Baranivka in Baranivka, Khmelnytskyi Oblast (49°08′55″N 26°59′30″E)
- Staro-Nekrasivka in Stara Nekrasivka, Odesa Oblast (45°19′57.5″N 28°55′40″E)

== Results ==
=== Historical ===
At publication in 1858, the flattening of the earth was estimated at one part in 294.26. The earth's equatorial radius was estimated at 6,378,360.7 meters (20,926,380 ft).

In 2005, the work was repeated using satellite navigation. The new flattening estimate was one part in 298.257 222 101 and the equatorial radius was 6,378,136.8 metres (20,925,646 ft).

An earlier survey, in 1740, had given flattening at one part in 178 and an equatorial radius of 6,396,800 metres (20,986,900 ft).

=== Modern ===
Northernmost point: Hammerfest (Fuglenes): 70° 40' 11.23″ N

Southernmost point: Ismail (Staro-Nekrassowka): 45° 20' 02.94″ N

Difference in Geodetic Latitude: 25° 20' 08.29″

Distance in kilometres: 2,821.853 ± 0.012

== See also ==
- Paris meridian
