= University of Tartu Museum =

Museum in Tartu, Estonia

Coordinates: 58°22′48.98″N 26°42′55.52″E

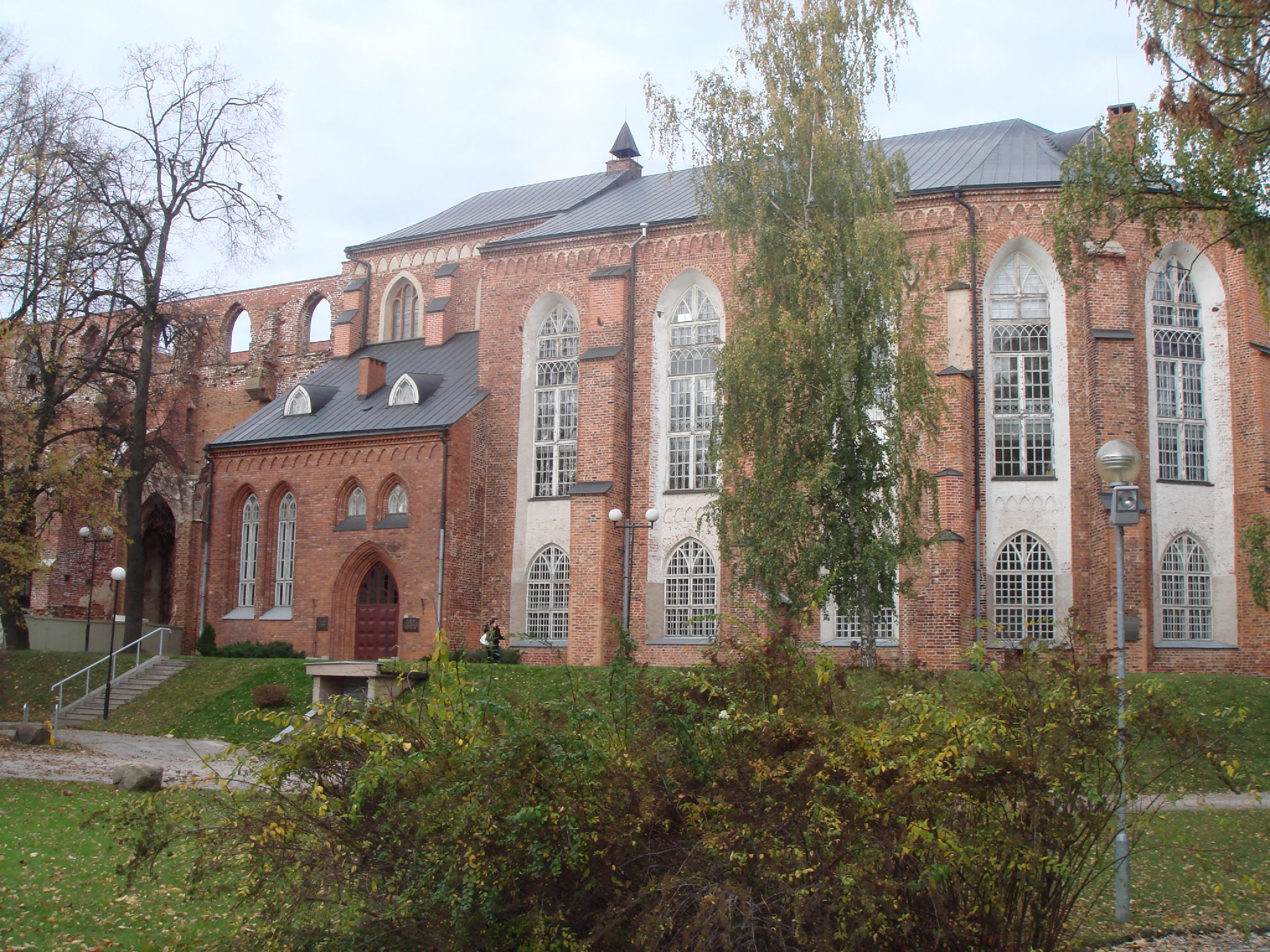
University of Tartu Museum in the Tartu Cathedral

University of Tartu Museum is the museum for the University of Tartu. Its entities include the University of Tartu Museum in the historic Tartu Cathedral, the University of Tartu Old Observatory, the University of Tartu Natural History Museum, the University of Tartu Botanical Gardens, and the University of Tartu Art Museum.

== History ==
The museum’s collections were started by Tullio Ilomets, an Associate Professor of Organic Chemistry, in the 1960s. In 1965, while the collection was being stored in the attic of the University's main building, a fire destroyed some of the collection.

The University of Tartu History Museum was created in 1976. In 1981, following the university's library moving to its new building, the museum moved into the Tartu Cathedral. In 2014, the University History Museum was re-named the University of Tartu Museum.

== The collections of the museum ==
The University of Tartu Museum’s collections have been part of the Estonian National Cultural History Collection since 2004.

The museum's emphasis is on science history and the collection of scientific equipment. The collection comprises 73,398 items, documents and photos.

The museum collection is divided into eight categories:

- The Scientific Collection
- The Astronomy-Mathematics Collection
- The Physics-Chemistry Collection
- The Medical Collection
- The Historical Collection
- The Art Collection
- The Archive collection
- The Photo Collection

== Publications ==
- Annual journal The Questions on the History of the University of Tartu, since 1975, Tartu University Press
- Leppik, L. (2014) Mountain of Muses: University of Tartu Museum on Toome Hill Publisher: Tartu Ülikooli muuseum
- Leppik, L. (2012) Tartu Tähetorn. Tartu Old Observatory Publisher Aasta Raamat
