= Fuglenes =

- District
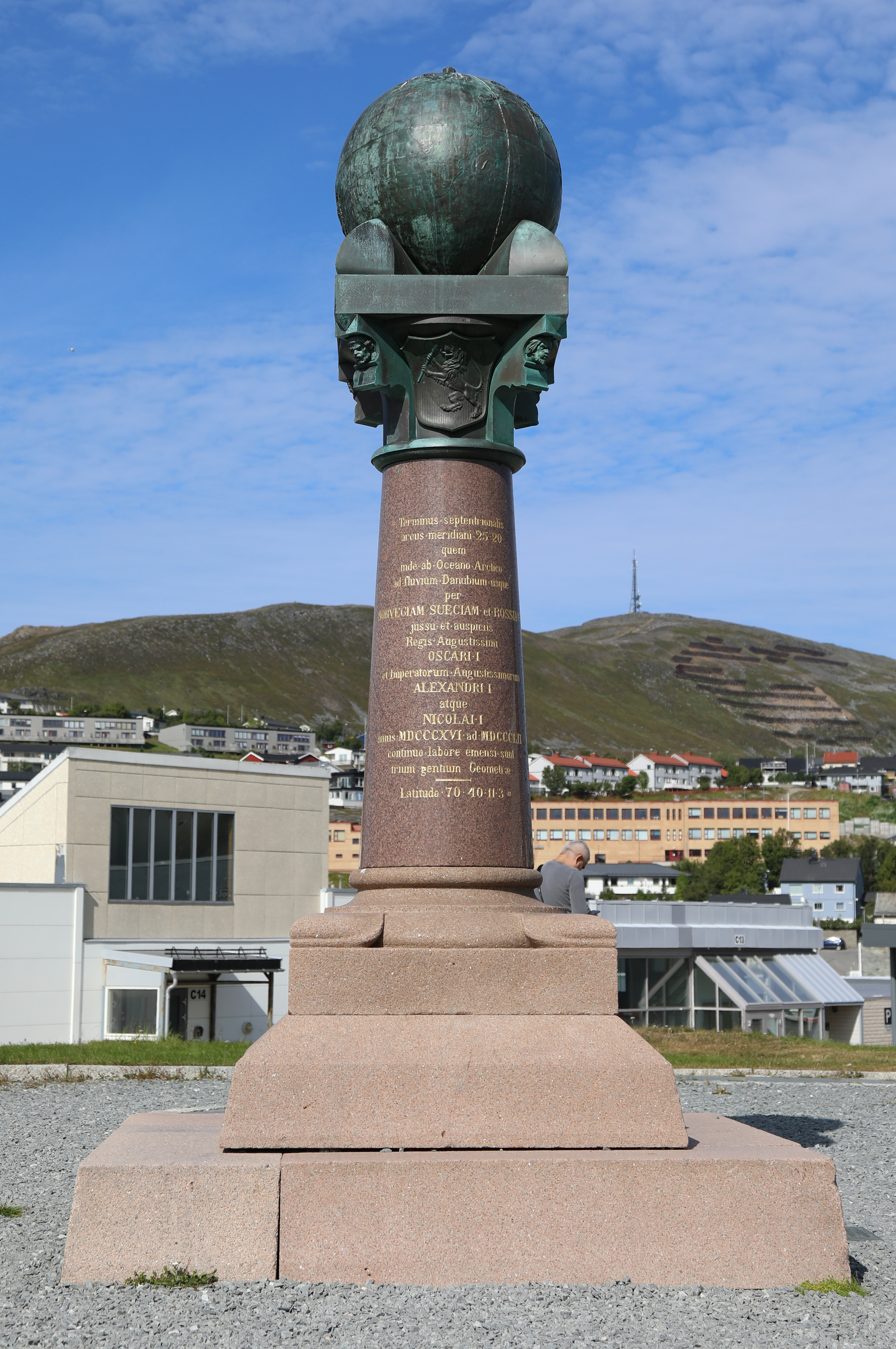
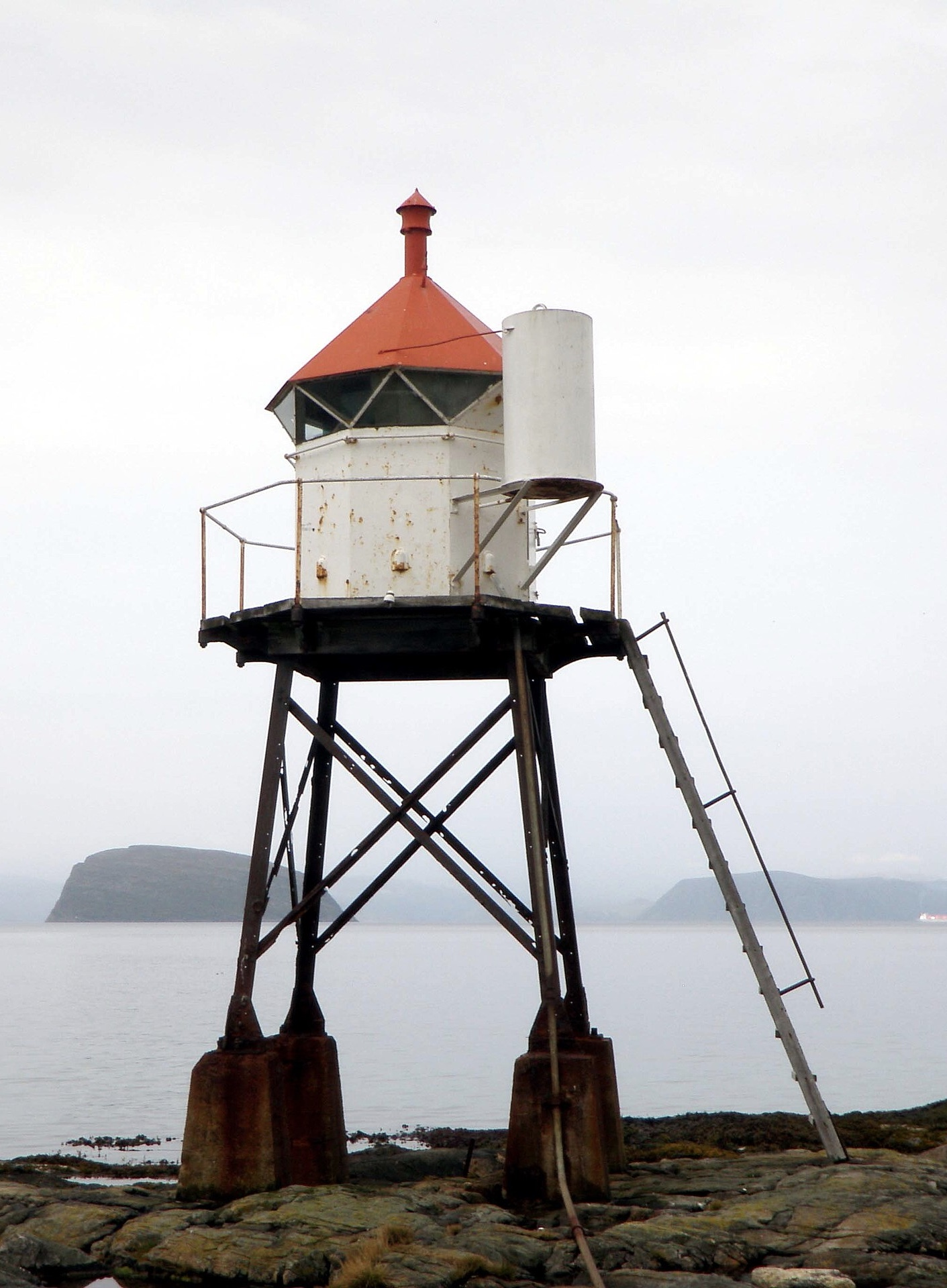
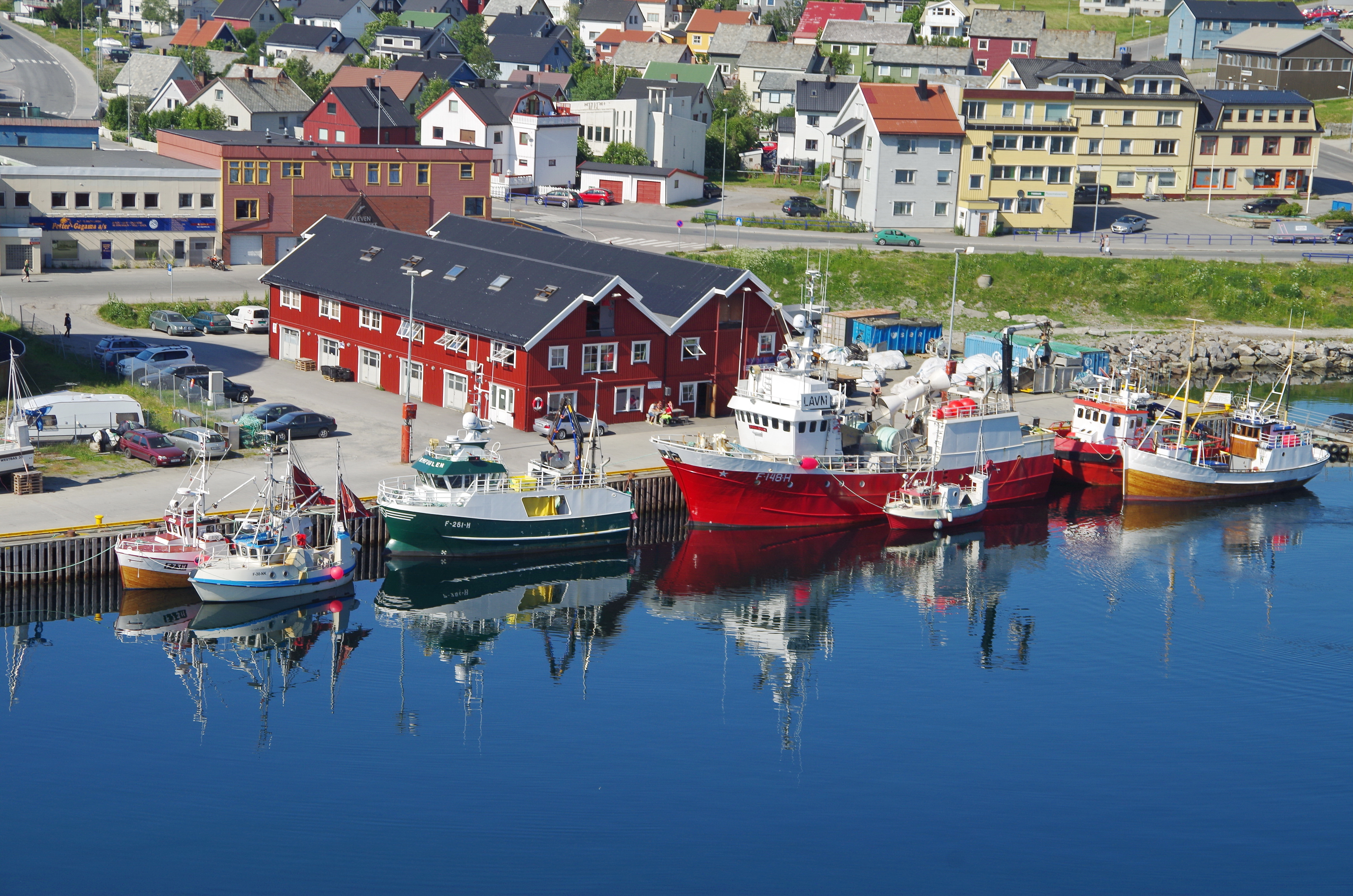
- From top left to right: Northernmost station of the Struve Geodetic Arc, Fuglenes light beacon, Hammerfest Harbour at Fuglenes Peninsula
- Interactive map of Fuglenes
- Coordinates: 70.67°N 23.663333°E
- Country: Norway
- County: Finnmark
- Municipality: Hammerfest Municipality
- Time zone: UTC+01:00 (CET)
  - Summer (DST): UTC+02:00 (CEST)

Fuglenes is a district in Hammerfest Municipality in Norway. It is the location of the northernmost point of the Struve Geodetic Arc. It is a geodetic point, one of the 34 points selected for the World Heritage List. It was here that Friedrich Georg Wilhelm von Struve's surveys ended in 1852.

== The meridian support ==
The meridian support was designed by Wilhelm von Hanno and erected in 1854 to commemorate the largest international measurement of the Earth's shape and size. The meridian support with plinth, column, chapter, and globe is an example of the styles von Hanno was inspired by.

The shelf is in three parts and in unpolished granite. While the two lower parts are almost square, the upper part is leaf-shaped, where the tip of the leaf forms corners and points towards the directions north, west, south and east. In a circular base on this upper part of the shelf rests the column. This polished granite column becomes narrower in diameter with height.

The survey was initiated by Wilhelm Struve who received support from King Oscar I of Norway-Sweden and Alexander I of Russia.

The meridian support is on the UNESCO list and is a protected cultural monument. The meridian support has the following inscription: [translated in English] "The northernmost endpoint of a meridian arc of 25° 20' from the northern ocean to the Danube river - through Norway, Sweden and Russia. By arrangement of HM Oscar I and Emperors Alexander I and Nicolaus I by uninterrupted geometries. Latitude 70 ° 40' 11.3"."

== Other notable buildings/landmarks ==
- Fuglenes Lighthouse, lighthouse which was established in 1859, and deactivated in 1911, when it was replaced by a light.
- Fuglenes School (Norwegian skole), public primary school which has 193 students in 8 school classes, from first to seventh grade. The school principal is Turid Leseth.
- Skansen på Fuglenes, historic landmark.

== Notable people ==
- Charles Robertson (1875–1958), Norwegian Minister of Trade 1926–1928.
