= Rudi Monastery =

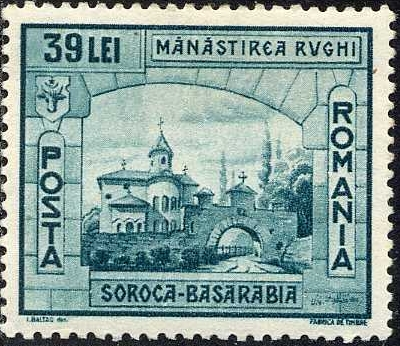
- 1941 stamp
- Rudi Monastery
- 48°20′N 27°54′E
- Location: Rudi, Soroca District
- Country: Moldova
- Denomination: Eastern Orthodoxy

History
- Status: Monastery

Architecture
- Completed: 1777

The Rudi (Rughi) Monastery (Romanian: Mănăstirea Rudi) is a monastery in Rudi, Moldova. It was established in Moldavia in 1777.

== Gallery ==
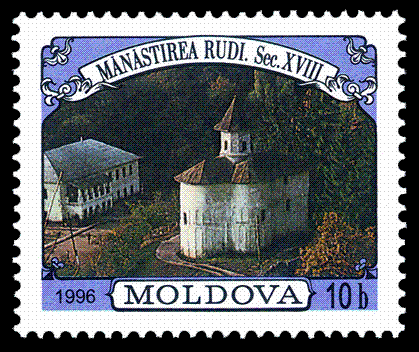
1996 stamp
