= University of Tartu Art Museum =

Art museum in Tartu, Estonia

Coordinates: 58.38083°N 26.71996°E

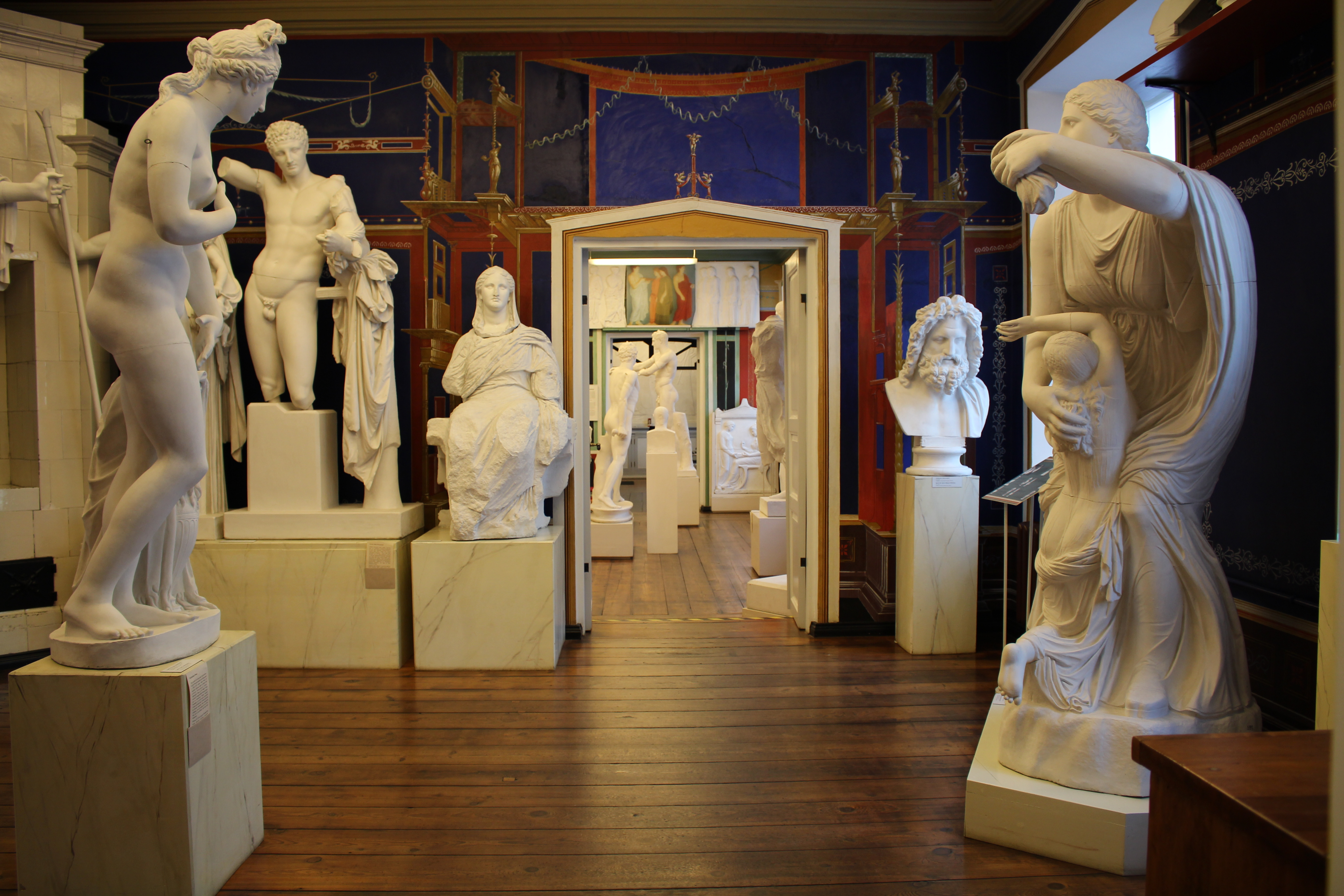
University of Tartu Art Museum, Blue Hall

University of Tartu Art Museum (Estonian: Tartu Ülikooli kunstimuuseum) is an art museum in Tartu, Estonia. It was founded in 1803 at the Imperial University of Dorpat and is considered to be the oldest art museum in Estonia. The museum is located in Main building of Tartu University. The museum is a branch of University of Tartu Museum. The chief of the museum is Mariann Raisma.

The museum has a permanent exhibition which consists of, amongst other objects, original size plaster cast copies of Archaic, Classical and Hellenistic Greece.

Since 1980 the museum has been home to the mummies of two Egyptian boys. They have been carbon dated as living between 410 and 50BC. They were donated to the university in 1819 on the death of their collector Otto von Richter.
