= Tullio Ilomets =

Estonian chemist (1921–2018)

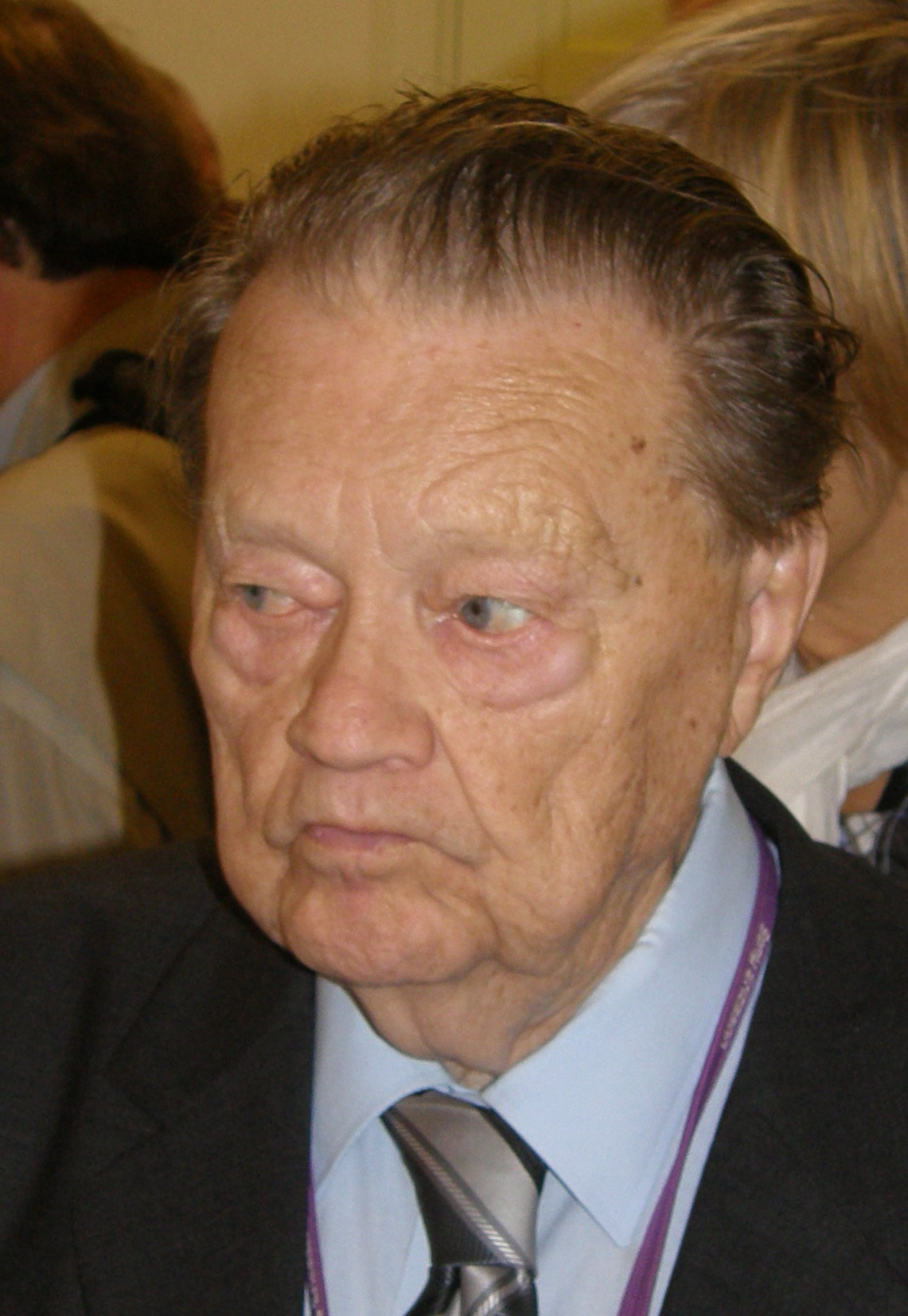
Tullio Ilomets

Tullio Ilomets (13 July 1921 – 22 August 2018) was an Estonian chemist, science historian and a volunteer in heritage protection.

== Education ==
Born in Paide, Ilomets graduated from Paide Secondary School in 1941. He continued to study chemistry at the Tallinn Polytechnic Institute (1946-1948) and Tartu State University from 1948-1952. He has served as faculty member and research fellow with the University of Tartu Department of Chemistry's institute of organic chemistry since 1952. He earned a candidate's degree in chemistry and became associate professor in 1965 and associate professor emeritus in 2007.

== Science history and academic heritage ==
Ilomets was one of the founders of the Academic Heritage Society and is an honorary member of the Estonian Heritage Society. He was a member of the Society of Estonian Conservators.

In the 1960s, Ilomets began to collect and store, in the basement of the University of Tartu main building, discarded science equipment and memorabilia linked to the history of the university. In 1976, the basement collection lead to the creation of the University History Museum.

Ilomets, as of 2016 with his 95 years, was the oldest working employee at the University of Tartu.

== Awards ==
- 2001 - Order of the White Star third class
- 2001 - Honorary Citizen of Tartu

== Publications ==
- Tullio Ilomets "The collection of photographs and photogravures by William Henry Fox Talbot in the University of Tartu Library" Tallinn: Aasta Raamat, 2016
- Vello Past, Tullio Ilomets, Hain Tankler "Chemistry and pharmacy at the University of Tartu/Dorpat/Yurjev 1802–1918" Tartu: Tartu Ülikool, 2009
- Lembit Tähepõld, Tullio Ilomets "Gustav von Bunge - a great scientist and teacher in development of physiological and pathological chemistry" Tallinn: Eesti Teaduste Akadeemia, 1995
- "Development of research in the field of chemistry at Tartu University and the problems of genealogy of science" (articles) Lund, 1992
- "Tartu – oppidum universitatis dedicata est anno jubilaco 350 Almae matris" Tartu: Tartu Linna Täitevkomitee, 1982
- "Alma mater Tartuensis 1632–1982" (foto album; in co-operation with Hillar Palametsaga) Tallinn: Eesti Raamat, 1982
- "Folia Baeriana" 2. osa (toim.) Tallinn: Eesti NSV Teaduste Akadeemia 1976
- "Karl Ernst von Baer, 1792–1876" Tallinn: Eesti Raamat, 1976
- "Keemia-alased tööd. Труды по химии. 1" (vastutav toimetaja) Тарту: Тартуский государственный университет, 1960
