= Pullinki =

Mountain in Sweden

Coordinates: 66°38′N 23°49′E

Pullinki is a 335-metre (1,099 ft) high mountain in northern Sweden, near the town of Övertorneå. The mountain marks one of the locations for the Struve Geodetic Arc, a World Heritage Site.

== Features ==
There is also an alpine ski resort on the mountain. It has a 253-metre altitude difference and 16 slopes.
