= University of Tartu Old Observatory =

Former observatory of University of Tartu, Estonia, currently a museum

Coordinates: 58.3788°N 26.7201°E

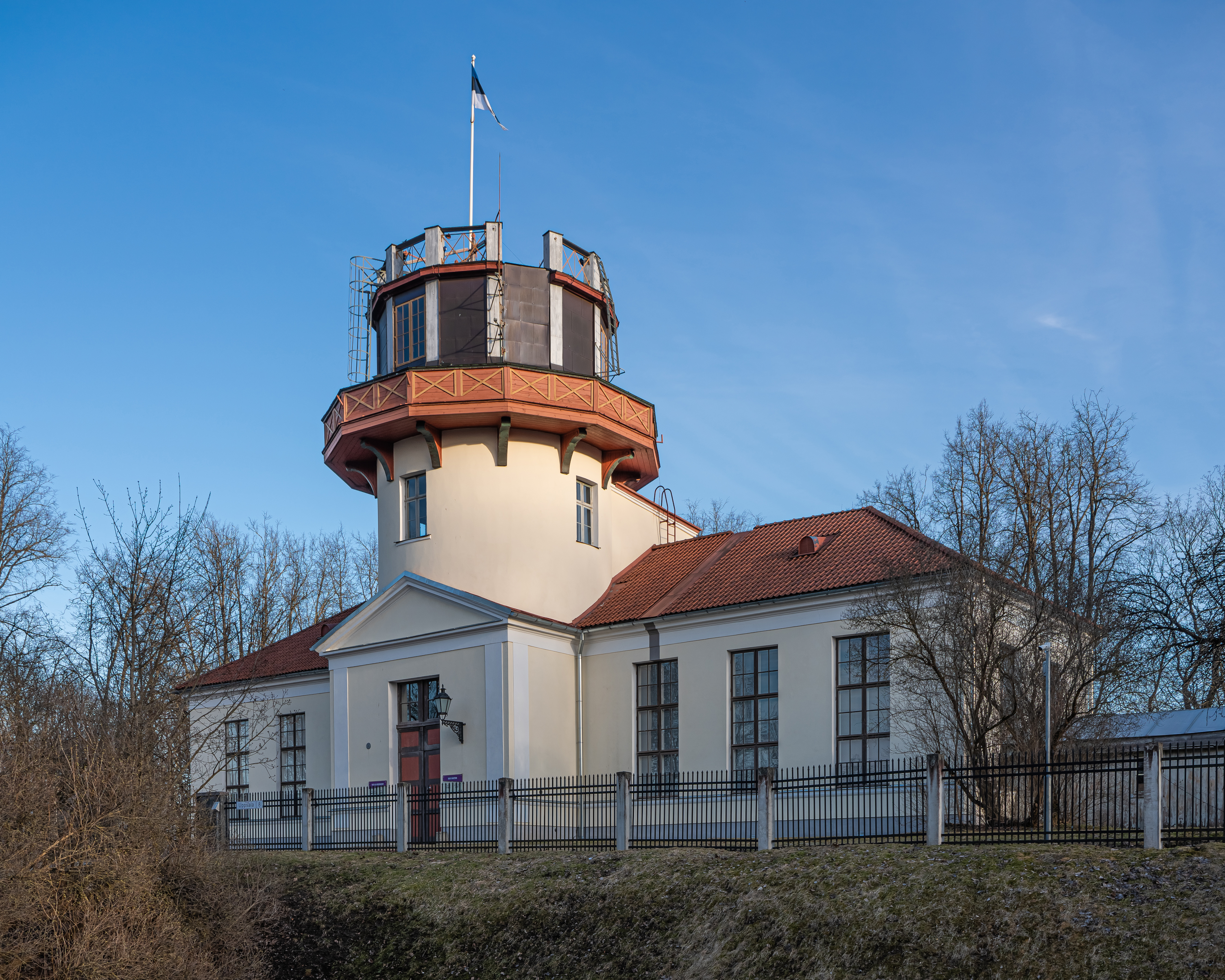
Tartu Old Observatory

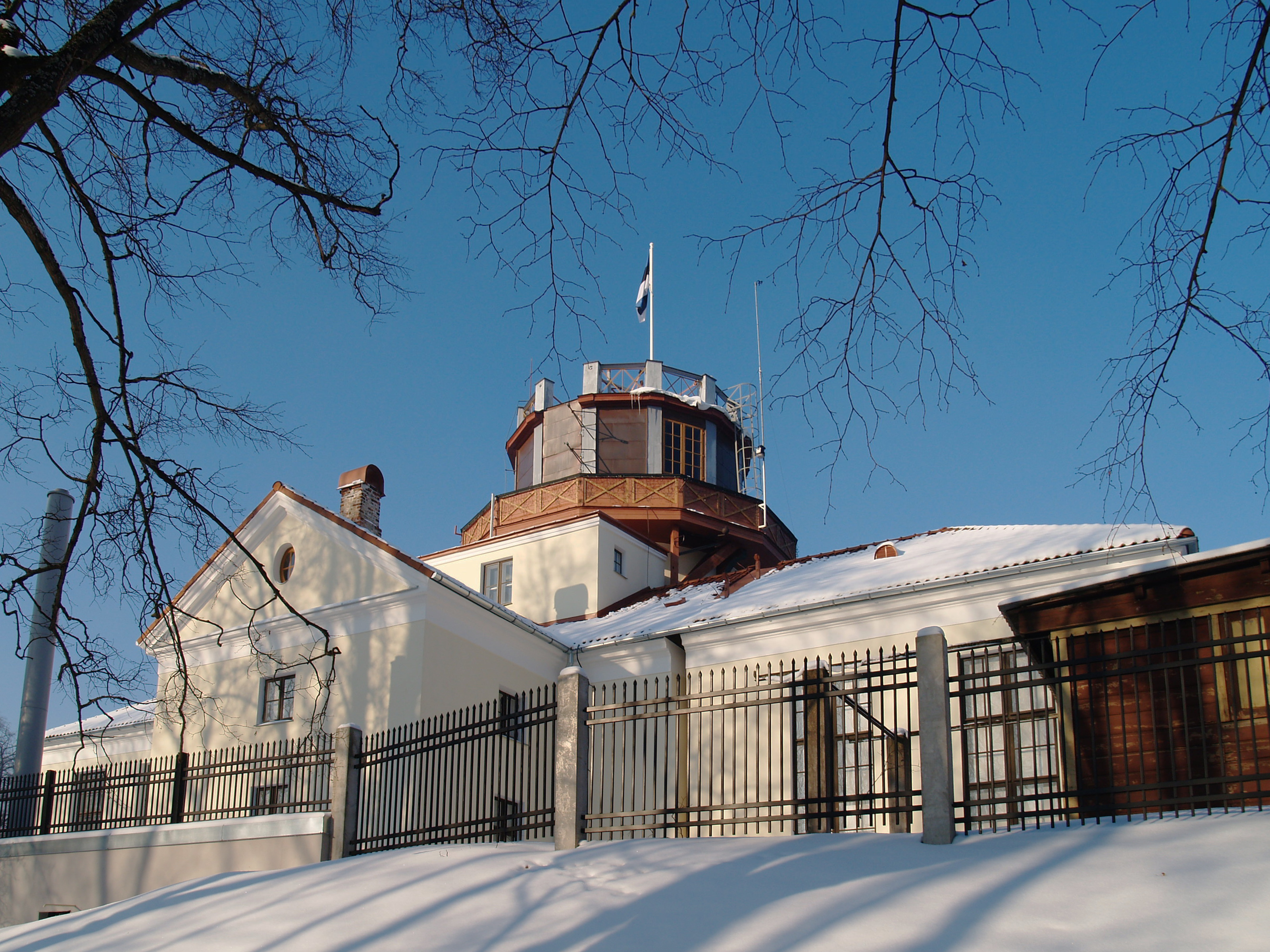
In winter

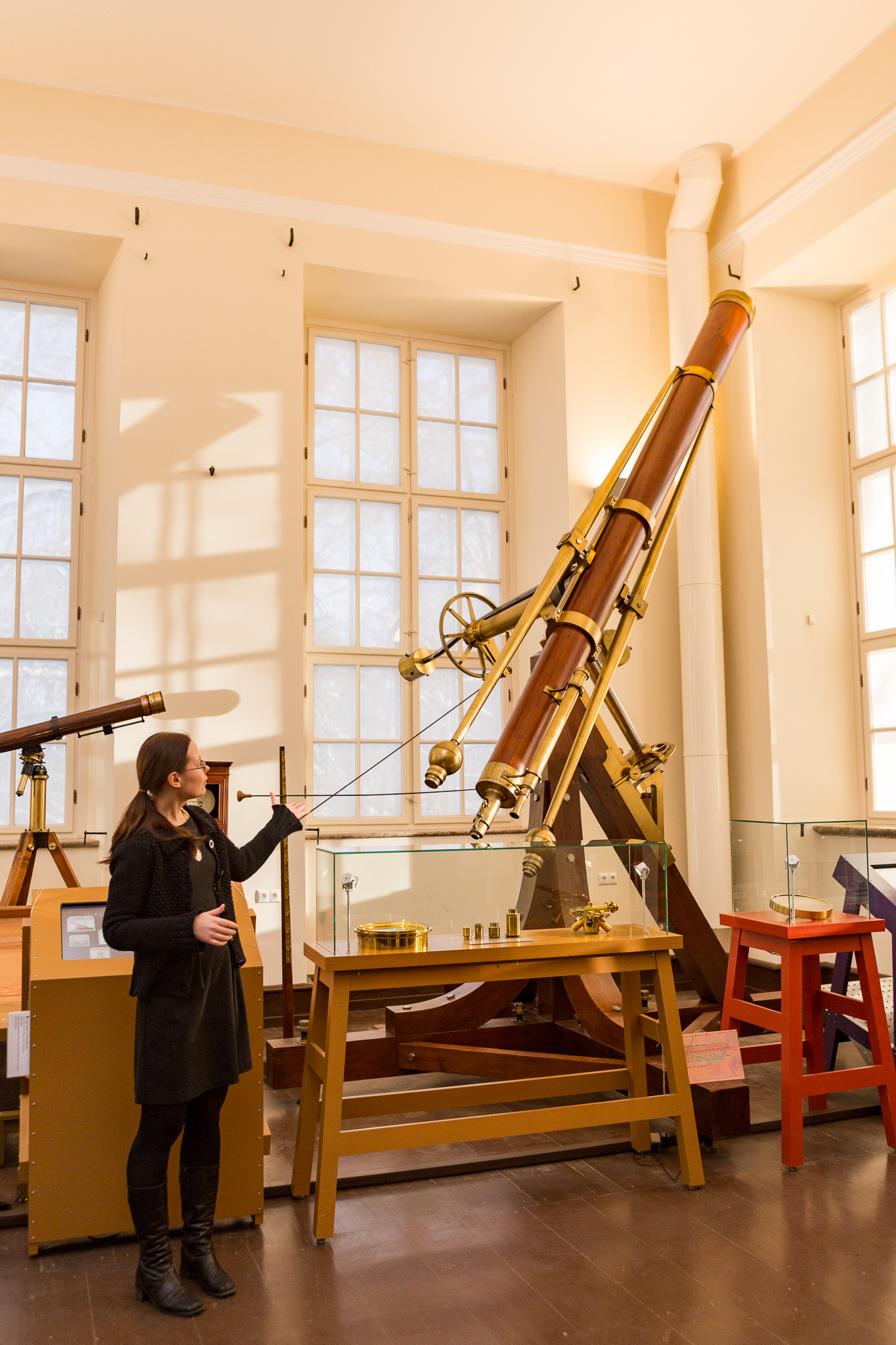
Fraunhofer Refractor

University of Tartu Old Observatory or Tartu Old Observatory (Estonian: Tartu Tähetorn) is an observatory in Tartu, Estonia. Tartu Observatory was an active observatory from 1810 to 1964. The building now serves as a museum and belongs to the University of Tartu Museum.

As first measurement point of Struve Geodetic Arc it is enlisted as a UNESCO World Heritage Site. Due to its significance in the history of astronomy, it has been declared an Outstanding Astronomical Heritage by the International Astronomical Union. It is registered as a National Cultural Monument of Estonia.

== History ==
Construction of the observatory started in 1808. While it was completed in 1810, setting up the necessary instruments took a few years more. The last of them was the Fraunhofer Great Dorpat Refractor, that was the largest refracting telescope at the time and was constructed in 1824. It has been titled as "the first modern, achromatic, refracting telescope".

Since 1813, Friedrich Georg Wilhelm von Struve worked there and in 1820 he became a professor and director of the observatory. He studied double stars and was the first to measure the exact distance to a star, Vega. He also initiated the Struve Geodetic Arc. Struve helped to organize the building of Pulkovo Observatory and when it opened in 1839, he went on to become its director.

Johann Heinrich von Mädler, who is known as the creator of the first precise map of the Moon, was appointed as a new director in 1840. He popularized astronomy and wrote the book Populäre Astronomie. He was followed by Thomas Clausen and then Peter Carl Ludwig Schwarz.

Grigori Levitsky (director 1894–1907) introduced the field of seismology and Konstantin Pokrovsky (director 1907–1917) looked for the possibility of erecting new observatory building outside of the city.

The first Estonian head of the observatory was Taavet Rootsmäe (director 1919–1948). That was also the time when Ernst Öpik, a famed Estonian astronomer and astrophysicist worked there. Öpik estimated the distance of the Andromeda Galaxy, created a method to count meteorites and postulated a theory concerning the origins of comets in the Solar System (this is now known as Öpik-Oort Cloud in his honor). After the occupation of Estonia during World War II, Öpik fled abroad and continued his work in Armagh Observatory.

In 1946, the observatory was taken from the University of Tartu and given to the Estonian Academy of Sciences. A larger observatory was built in Tõravere (completed in 1964) and most of the operations of Tartu Observatory were moved to new building. The old observatory remained mainly an office space. Only a society of amateur astronomers, the Tartu Tähetorni Astronoomiaring was still able to serve it as public observatory.

As the observatory hosts the highest point in town on February 24, 1989 the Flag of Estonia was raised publicly for the first time on top of the observation tower. The city's first internet connection was established at the observatory in 1992 by the EENet (Estonian Educational and Research Network).

The building was given back to University of Tartu in 1996. It was reconstructed in 2009–2010 and now serves as a museum.

== Gallery ==
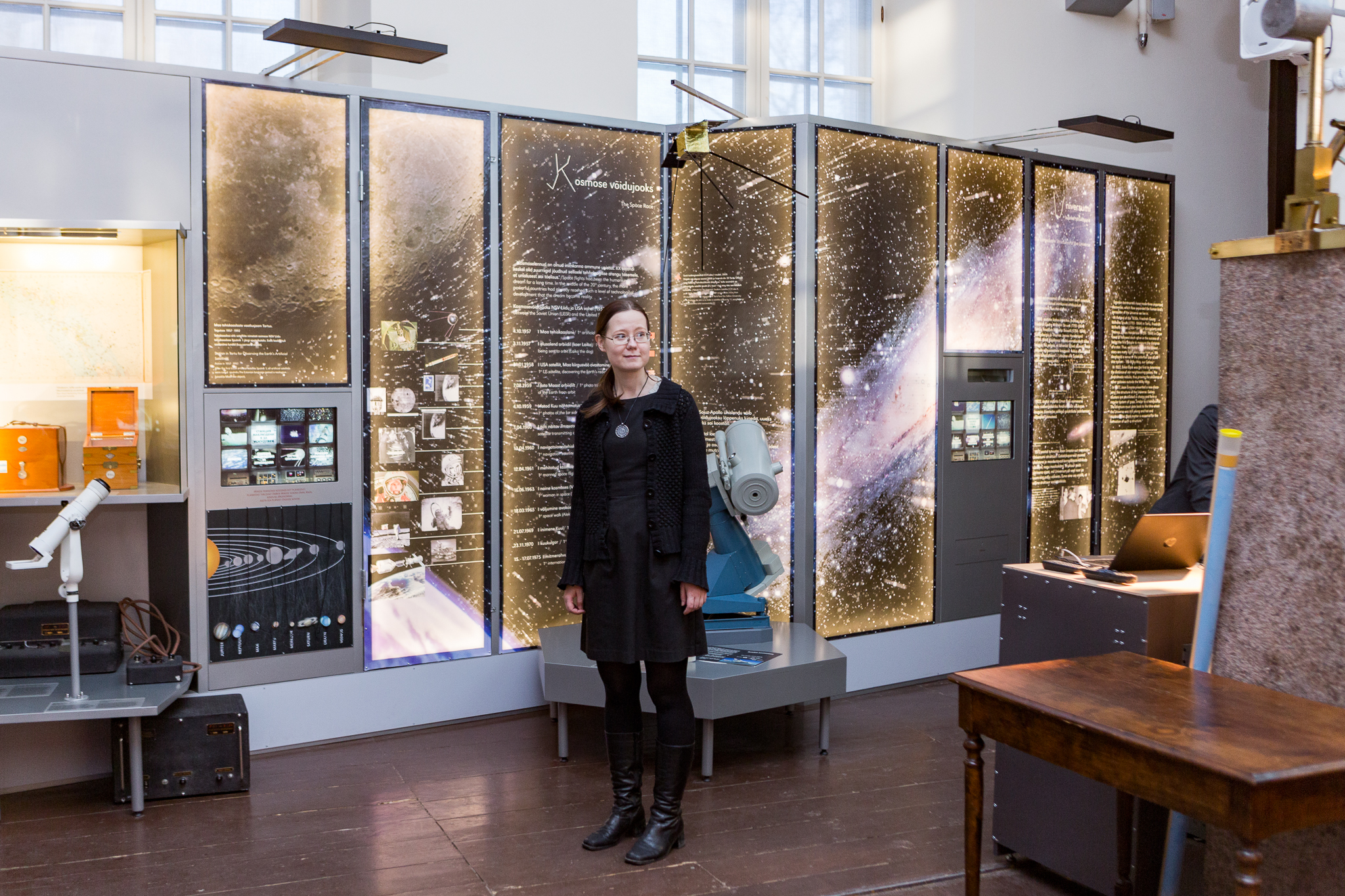
Janet Laidla, current director of the Old Observatory

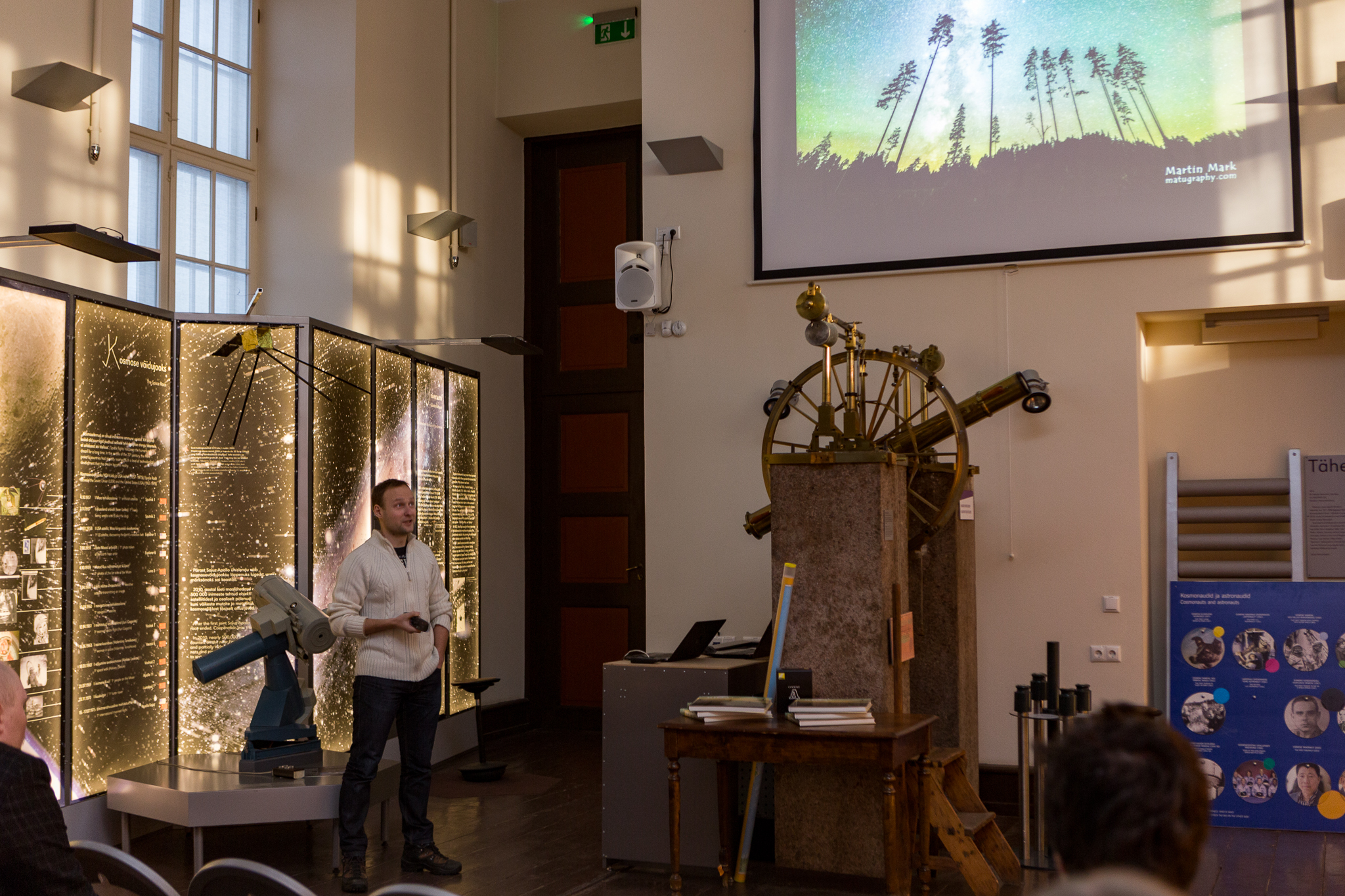
Lecture about night photography

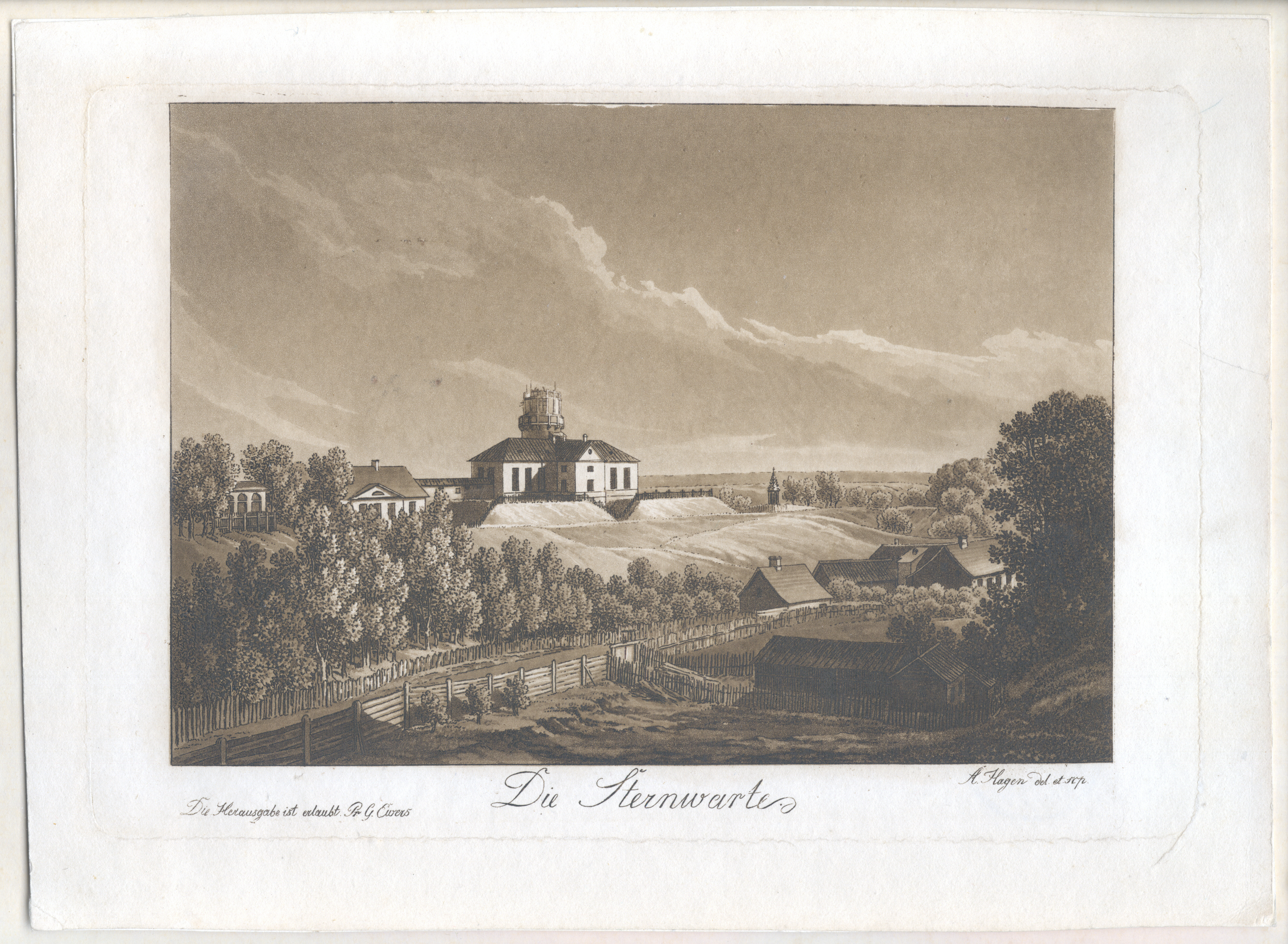
Lithography from 1827

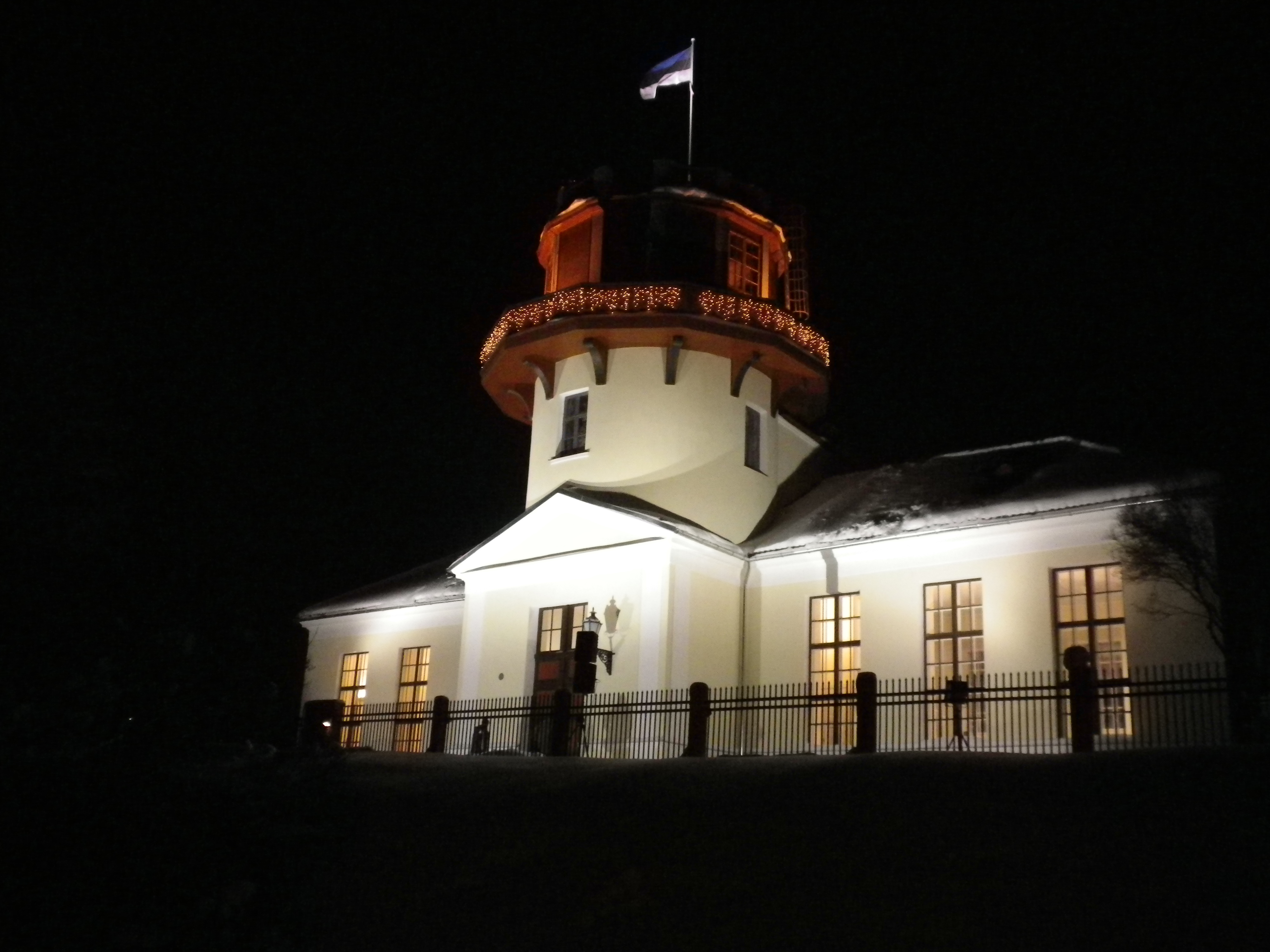
Christmas decoration on Old Observatory 2010

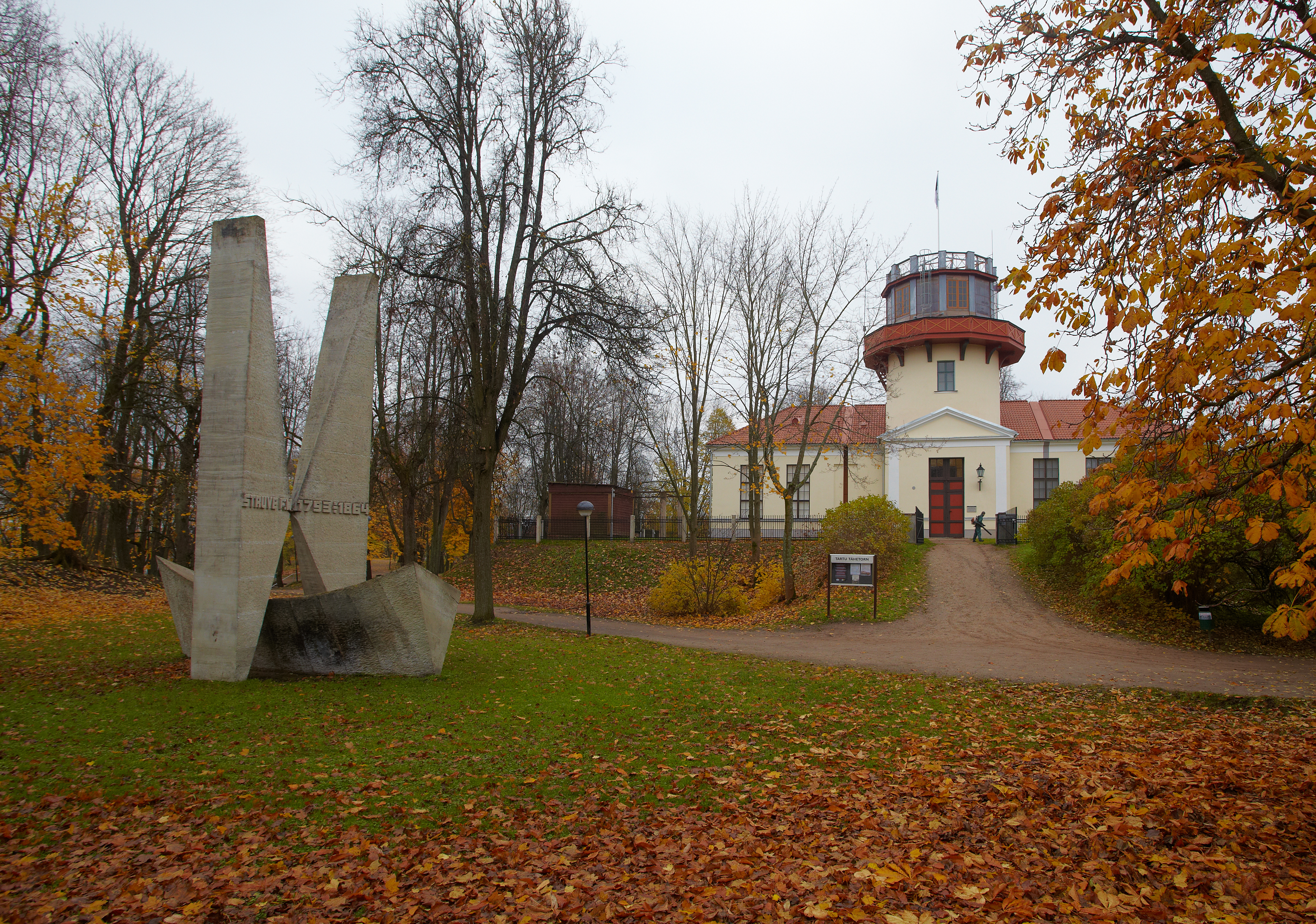
Toomemägi Park with Struve Monument 2011

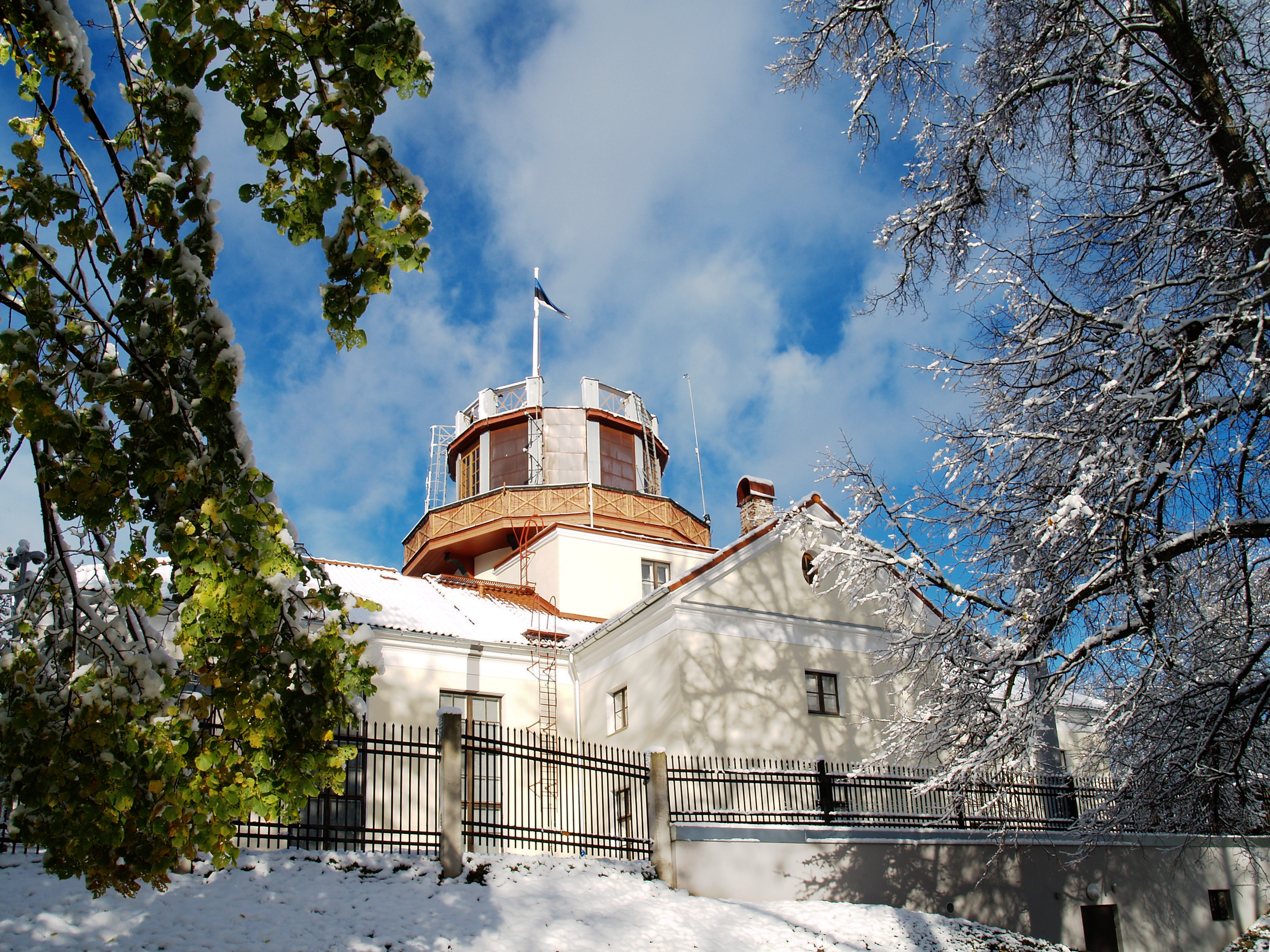
Old Observatory in 2012

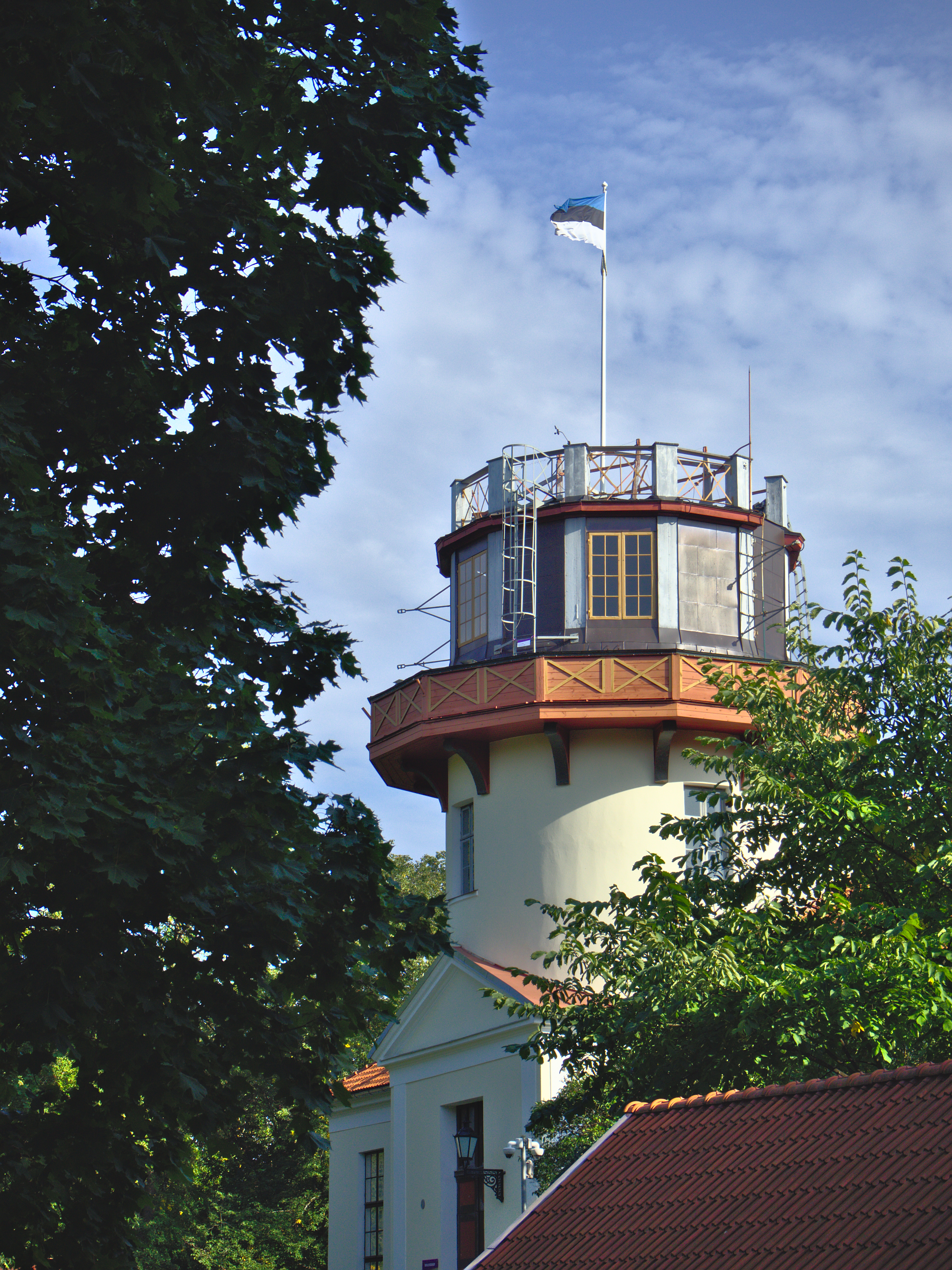
Old Observatory in summer 2018

== See also ==
- List of astronomical observatories
