= Rudi, Soroca =

Rudi
- Commune and village
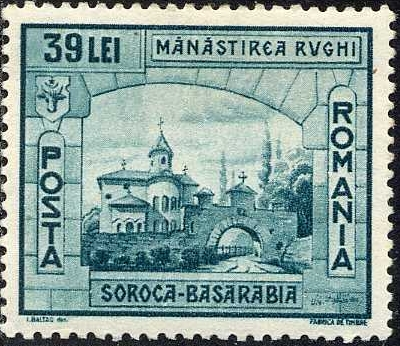
- Rudi Monastery

- Location in Moldova
- Coordinates: 48°20′N 27°54′E
- Country: Moldova
- District: Soroca District

Population (2014 census)
  - Total: 1,008
- Time zone: UTC+2 (EET)
  - Summer (DST): UTC+3 (EEST)

Rudi is a village in Soroca District, Moldova.

== Notable people ==
- Vasile Săcară
- Nicolae Secară

== Gallery ==
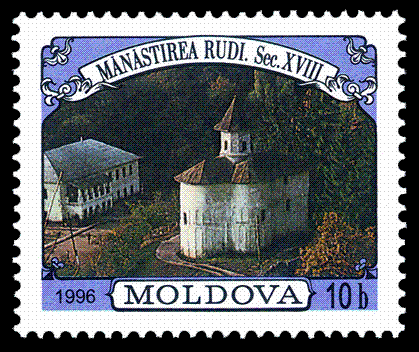
Rudi Monastery on a 1996 postage stamp

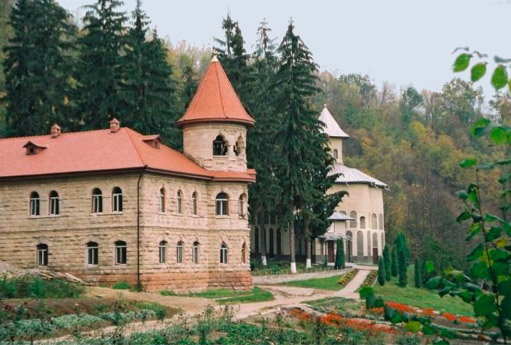
Rudi Monastery and Church

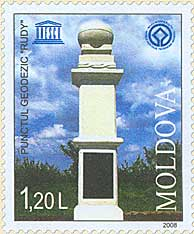
Rudi geodetic point

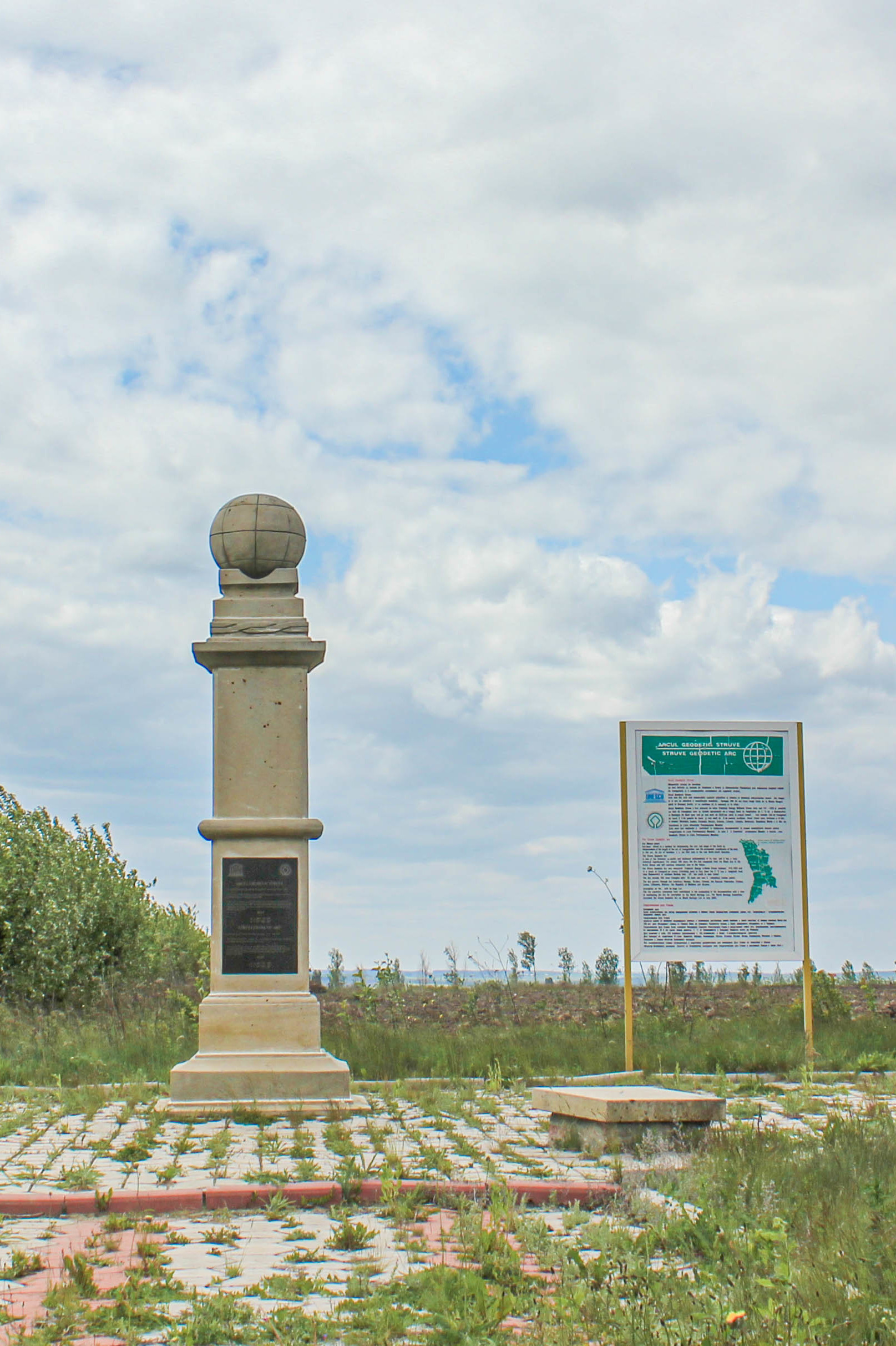
Rudi geodetic point
