= Trei Ierarhi Monastery =

Monastery in Iași, Romania

Coordinates: 47°9′35″N 27°35′5″E

Trei Ierarhi Monastery Mănăstirea Trei Ierarhi
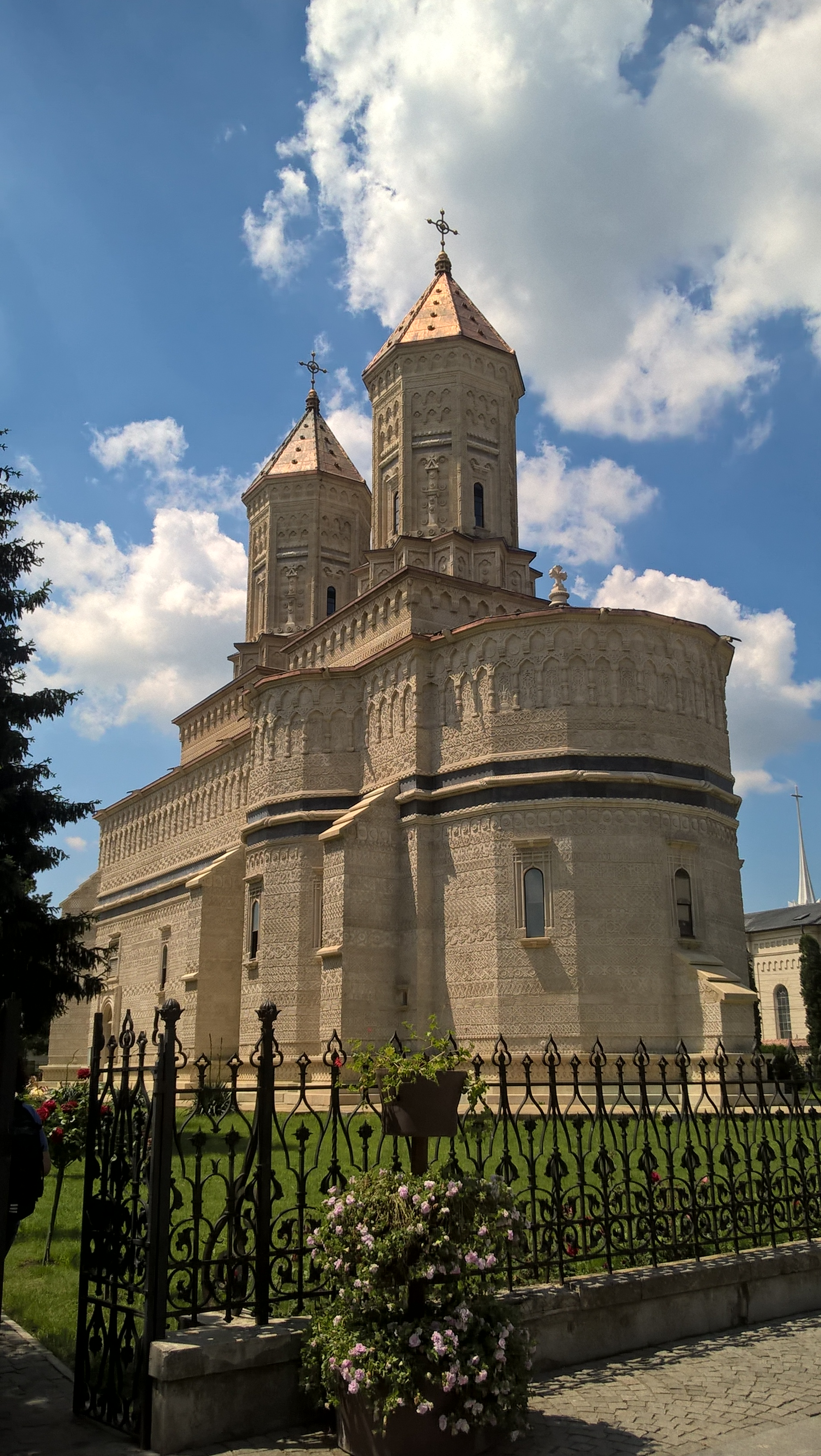
- Trei Ierarhi Monastery Church

Religion
- Affiliation: Romanian Orthodox
- District: Metropolitan of Moldavia and Bukovina

Location
- Location: Iași
- State: Romania
- Interactive map of Trei Ierarhi Monastery; Mănăstirea Trei Ierarhi

Architecture
- Style: Moldavian
- Groundbreaking: 1637
- Completed: 1639
- Materials: stone, brick

Mănăstirea Trei Ierarhi (Monastery of the Three Hierarchs) is a seventeenth-century monastery located in Iași, Romania. The monastery is listed in the National Register of Historic Monuments and included on the tentative list of UNESCO World Heritage Sites.

== History ==
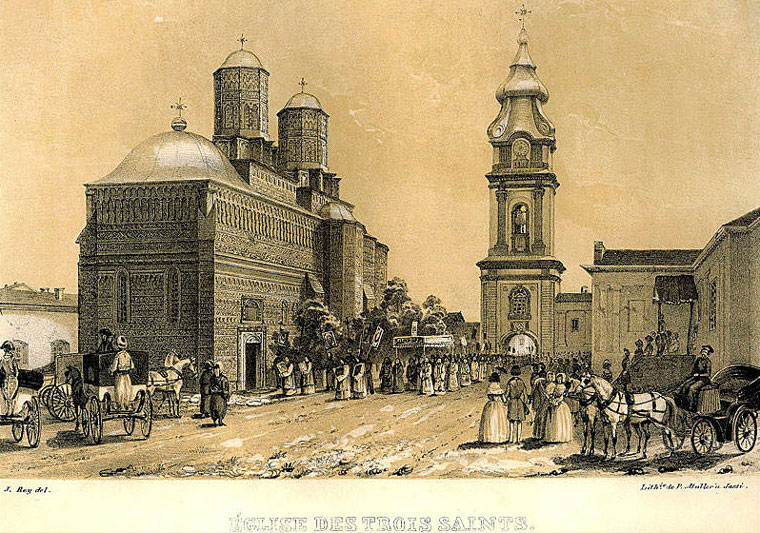
Trei Ierarhi Church and Tower in 1845

The church was erected between 1637 and 1639, in the Moldavian capital, in honour of the Three Holy Hierarchs of Eastern Orthodoxy (Basil of Caesarea, Gregory of Nazianzus, and John Chrysostom), and was blessed by Bishop Varlaam. In 1640, Prince Vasile Lupu, the renowned defender of the Orthodox Church, set up here the first printing press in Moldavia and the Vasilian College, a higher education institute. In 1643, the first volume ever printed in Moldavia was issued in Iași. The Trei Ierarhi Church was dedicated by Vasile Lupu to the 20 monasteries on Mount Athos.

Here, on 24 February 1821, Alexander Ypsilantis, who coordinated the Greek Revolution of 1821, issued a proclamation calling all Greeks and Christians to rise up against the Ottomans, beginning the revolution.

Several Romanian royal figures are buried inside the church: Tudosca (Vasile Lupu's first wife) and Ștefan Vodă, their son; prince and scholar Dimitrie Cantemir (1673–1723); and Alexandru Ioan Cuza, the first ruler of the united Romanian principalities (1859–1866).

== Architectural features ==
The church became renowned for the extraordinary lacery in stone which adorns the facades, from bottom to the top of the derricks. One can count over 30 non-repeating registers of decorative motives. Western architectural elements (Gothic, Renaissance) combine with the Eastern style, of Armenian (Khachkar), Georgian, Persian, Arabian or Ottoman inspiration, in a totally bold conception, whose result is a harmonious ensemble. The effusive scenery makes the church resemble a shrine of architectonic proportions, especially conceived to protect the Sfânta Cuvioasă Parascheva's relics (1641). After the 1882 restoration, the original fresco was derusted, some fragments still being kept today in the monastery's museum.

Near the church one can find the Gothic Hall, which shelters a religious art museum. It has, among other things, objects related to the history of the monastery. In the gate's tower (which today no longer exists), that served as belfry, Vasile Lupu had installed a huge horologe, the first public use clock in Romanian Principalities (1654). During the 1882 restoration, the whole mechanism was disassembled and transported to France, where it remained.

Architectural depictions of Trei Ierarhi Monastery
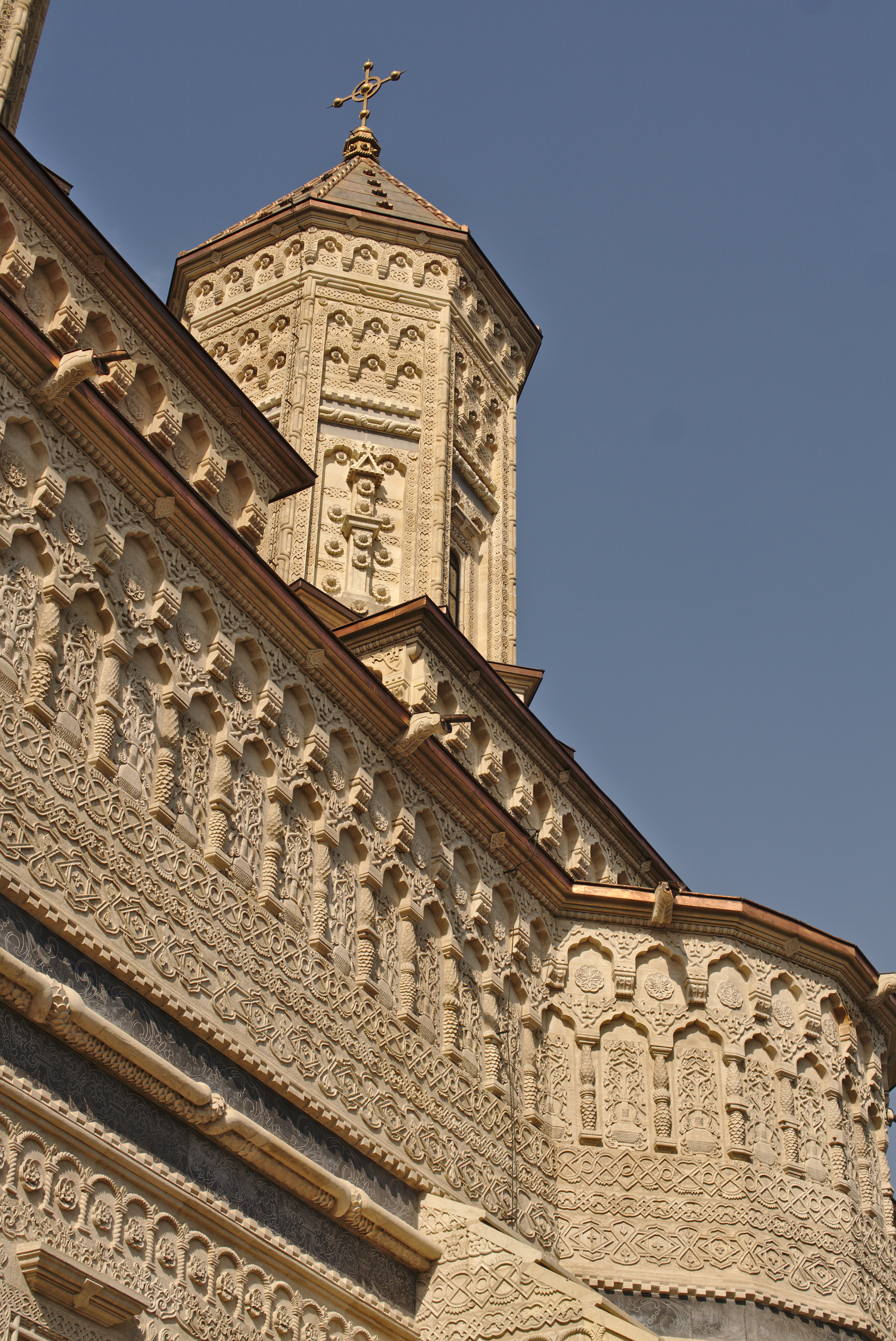
Exterior details

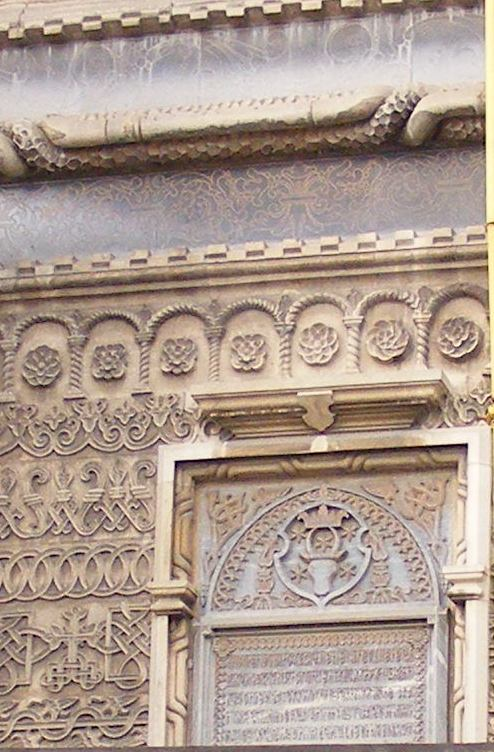
Inscription on the outer wall

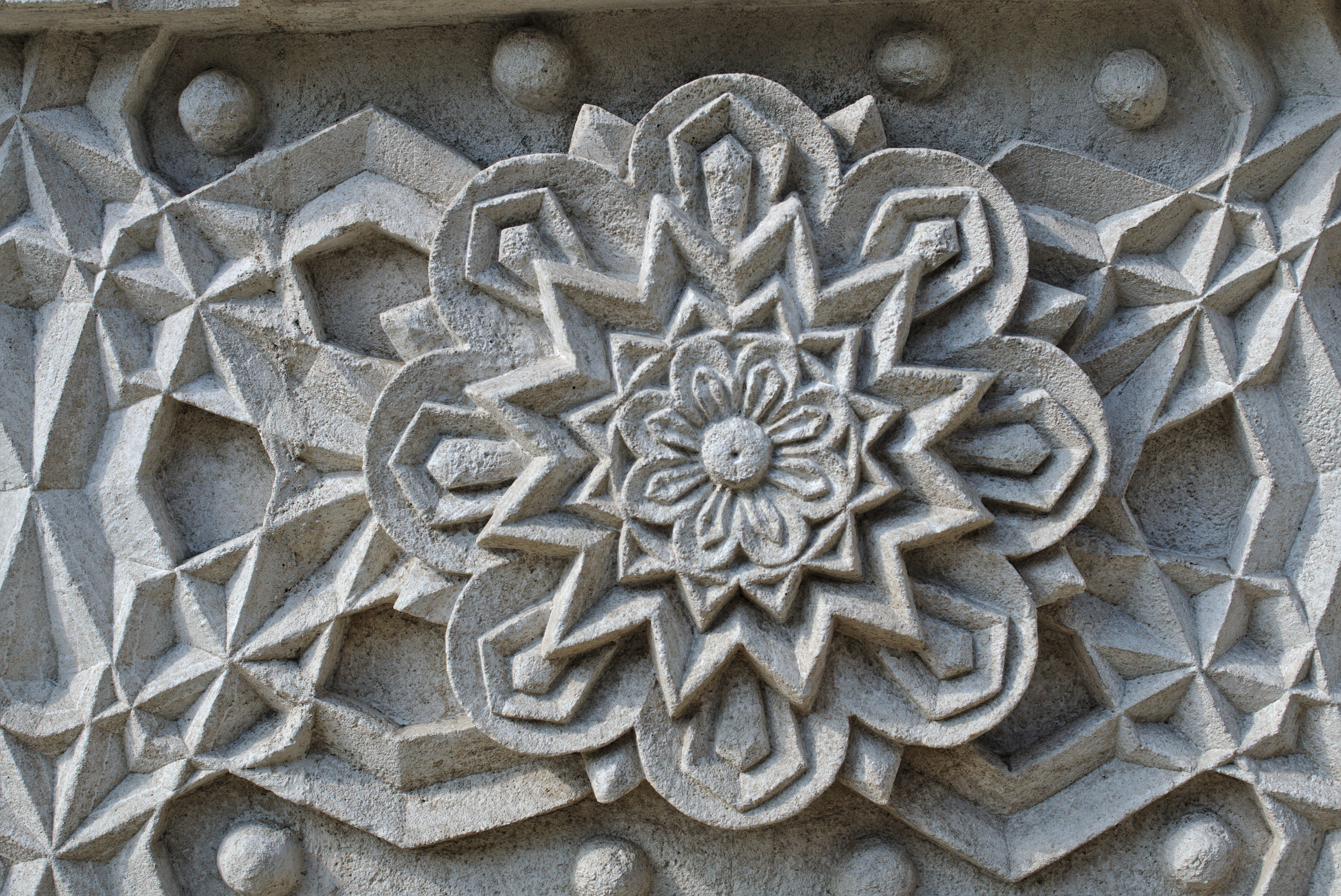
Example of stone lace pattern

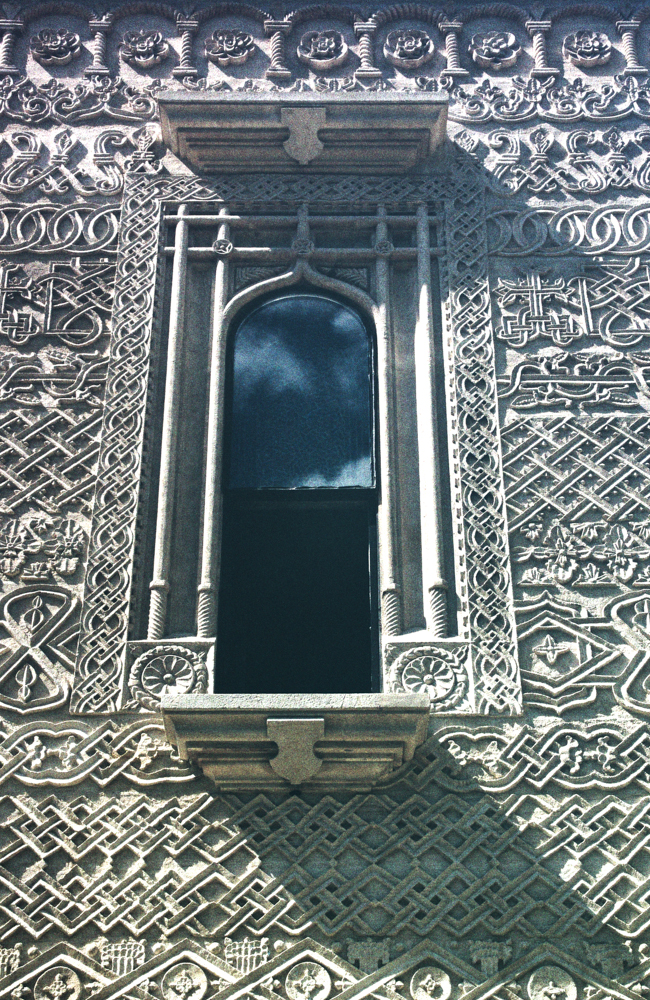
Window detail

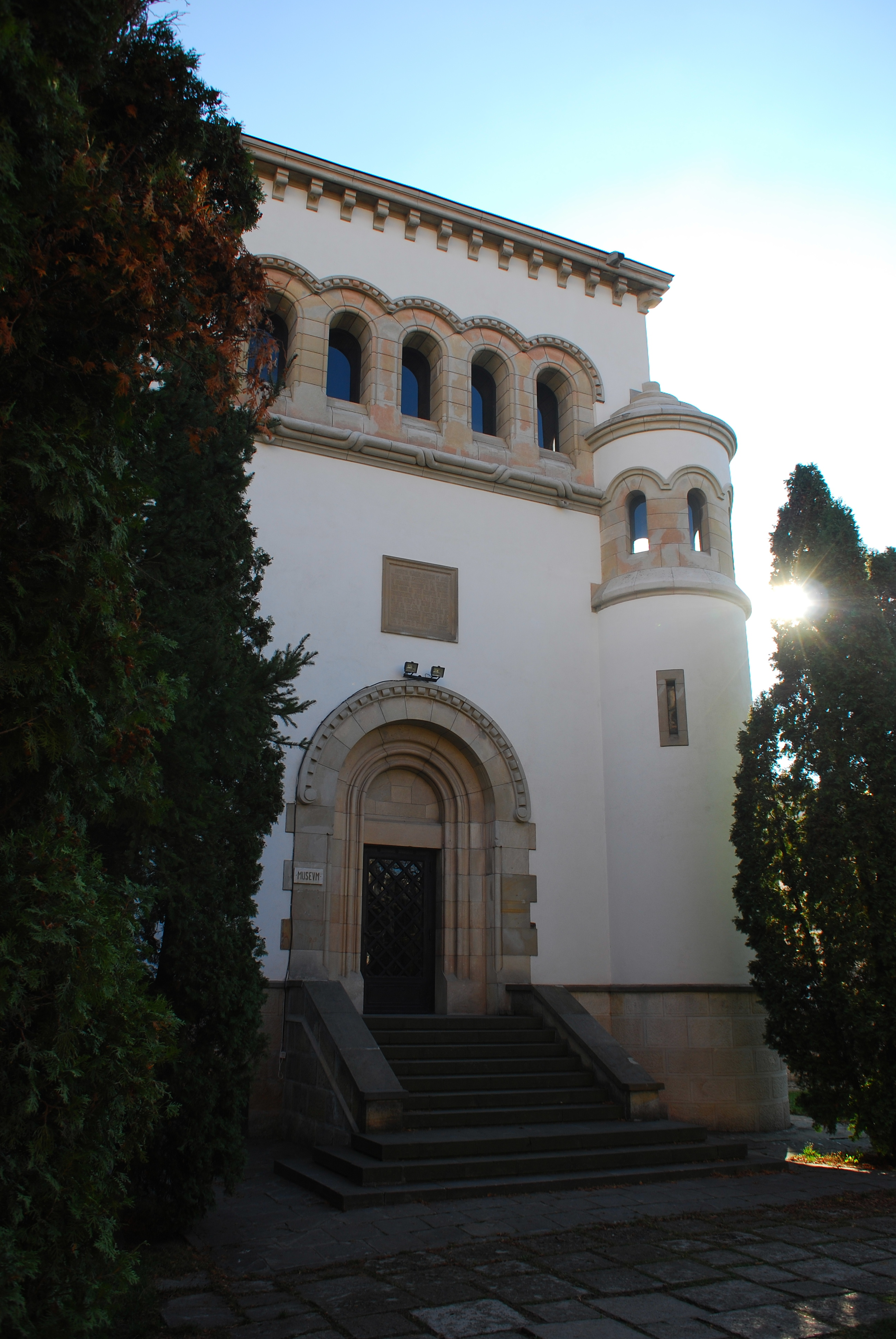
Entrance to the Gothic Hall

== See also ==
- Vasilian College
- Synod of Iași
