= Princely Academy of Iași =

Moldavian institution of higher learning, active in the 18th and 19th centuries

The Princely Academy of Iași was an institution of higher learning, active in the 18th and 19th centuries.

== History ==
Founded in Iași (capital of the Principality of Moldavia) by the Prince Antioh Cantemir in 1707, the Academy symbolically continued the Academia Vasiliană, although no direct link exists between the two similar institutions. The main reformer of the Academy was Grigore III Ghica (1776), who modernised it as to compete with the European universities. The studies were done in Greek, and for the better part of the 18th century they were basically Aristotelian. Beginning with the 1760s a series of enlightened directors introduced into the Academy the study of mathematics, natural sciences and modern philosophy, translating and adapting European handbooks.

In 1813–1819, Gheorghe Asachi lectured for the first time in Romanian at the Academy, training a class of engineers, as the School of Surveying and Civil Engineers (Școala de Ingineri Hotarnici și Civili).

In 1821, the Academy was disestablished by order of the Sultan, following the activity of the Greek patriotic organization, Filiki Eteria. Political circumstances caused that another Academy did not exist until 1835, when the Mihaileana Academy (Academia Mihăileană) was established. The new institution had some professors from the ancient one, so that we can trace a direct lineage between the two Academies. The Princely Academy did not offer standard academic degrees, but only diplomas that certified that the possessor was worthy of “the name of learned man”. This name gave to the bearer the possibility to hold diverse administrative offices within the Ottoman Empire and Danubian Principalities.

== Notable academics ==
- Nikephoros Theotokis (1764–1765; 1776–1777)
- Iosipos Moisiodax (1765–1776)
- Nicolaos Zerzoulis (Cercel) (1766–1722)
- Daniel Philippidis (1784–1786; 1803–1806)
- Stephanos Doungas (1813–1816)
- Dimitrios Panayotou Govdelas (1808–1811; 1816–1821)

== Notable alumni ==
- Costache Conachi
- George Săulescu
- Daniil Scavischi
- Scarlat Sturdza
- Vasile Vârnav

== See also ==
- Princely Academy of Bucharest
- Academia Vasiliană
- Academia Mihăileană
- Alexandru Ioan Cuza University

== Sources ==
- Bârsănescu, Ștefan, Academia Domnească din Iași. 1714 - 1821, București : Editura de Stat Didactică și Pedagogică, 1962
- Camariano-Cioran, Ariadna, Les Academies princières de Bucarest et de Jassy et leurs professeurs, Thessaloniki : Institute for Balkan Studies, 1974
- Nicolau, Şerban (2018). "Învăţământul academic din Ţările Române (II)" (PDF). Cercetări filosofico-psihologice. X (1): 29–46. ISSN 2066-7566.
