= Academia Mihăileană =

Coordinates: 47°9′57.75″N 27°34′41.66″E

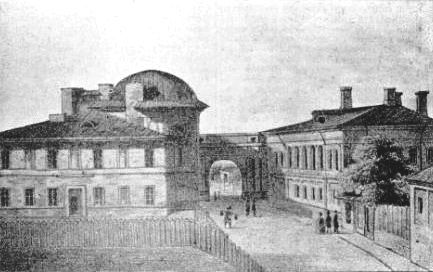
Academia Mihăileană

Academia Mihăileană was an institution of higher learning based in Iași, Moldavia, and active in the first part of the 19th century. Like other Eastern European institutions of its kind, it was both a high school and a higher learning institute, housing several faculties. Academia Mihăileană was the predecessor of the Iași National College and the University of Iași.

== History ==
Academia Mihăileană's founder is intellectual Gheorghe Asachi, who obtained the permission and support of the ruling Prince Mihail Sturdza. It derived its Mihăileană name from the monarch's first name (literally: "Michaelian Academy"). Sturdza issued the official decision which authorized the founding of the Academy in 1834. Because the institution was not assigned a building of its own, courses began at the Vasilian Gymnasium, a school founded by the same Asachi in 1828. On June 6, 1835, the academy had its official inauguration on separate premises, with the participation of Prince Sturdza. A dedication liturgy was held in the nearby Talpalari Church, which thenceforth served as the academy's chapel.

Although Academia Mihăileană no longer provided faculty courses after 1847, it was not legally abolished, and temporarily suspended its activity (during a time of political turmoil caused by the frequent Ottoman–Russian clashes on Moldavia's soil, and the periods of Russian occupation).

In 1860, Alexandru Ioan Cuza (Domnitor of the Principality of Moldavia) decided to disestablish the institution and split its patrimony. Its faculties were set up as a nucleus for the newly established University of Iași, while the inferior courses were re-created as the Iași National College (where studies lasted 7 years). Many of the academy's professors continued their activity within the University.

== Organisation ==
Academia Mihăileană was organized in three faculties, of Law, Philosophy and Theology, following the model of its predecessor, the Princely Academy from Iaşi (1707–1821), where Asachi had been a teacher of Applied Sciences and Engineering from 1813 to 1819. The program of study in the faculties of Philosophy and Theology lasted two years, while the Faculty of Law took three years. In order to be admitted into the Faculty of Law, one had to first graduate from Philosophy.

The Academy delivered certificates of study, but not specific academic degrees. Like present-day graduates of the École Normale Supérieure, students who completed courses at Academia Mihăileană only received a certificate that gave them the right to work in the service of the state, in administration, justice or education. Due to the quality of the study programs and to the qualification of the professors (most of them had a PhD from Austrian or Hungarian universities and were members of various academic associations), the Western universities readily recognized the Academy's study certificates. Their possessors could enlist directly in a doctoral program, similar to graduates of any Western university in the period.

== Notable faculty and alumni ==
- Simion Bărnuțiu (1808–1864), philosopher and jurist
- Dimitrie Asachi (1820–1868), mathematician
- Damaschin Bojincă (1802–1869), professor, politician, historian
- Iacob Cihac (1800–1888), medical doctor, professor of natural history
- Vasile Conta (1845–1882), philosopher, poet, and politician
- Alexandru Costinescu (1812–1872), architect engineer
- Nicolae Culianu (1832–1915), mathematician and astronomer
- Nicolae Dabija (1837–1884), general and politician
- Anastasie Fătu (1816–1886), medical doctor and naturalist, founder of the Iași Botanical Garden
- Christian Flechtenmacher (1785–1843), jurist, legislator, professor of Law
- Ion Ghica (1816–1897), revolutionary, politician, diplomat, writer, professor
- Dimitrie Gusti (1818–1887), writer, politician, professor
- Ion Ionescu de la Brad (1818–1891), revolutionary, agronomist, professor, scholar
- Mihail Kogălniceanu (1817–1891), politician, historian, professor
- Gheorghe Lemeni (1813–1848), painter
- Petre Maler-Câmpeanu (1809–1893), professor of philosophy, philologist
- Eftimie Murgu (1805–1870), revolutionary, politician, professor of philosophy
- Gheorghe Năstăseanu (1812–1864), painter
- Gheorghe Panaiteanu Bardasare (1816–1900), painter and graphician
- Constantin Petrescu-Conduratu (1844–1900), typographer, printer, writer
- Petru Poni (1841–1925), chemist and mineralogist
- Elie Radu (1853–1931), civil engineer and academic
- Gheorghe Săulescu (1798–1864), philologist, poet, professor of universal history and logic
- Filaret Scriban (1811–1873), theologian, translator, professor of rhetoric, poetry and mythology
- Neofit Scriban (1808–1884), theologian, writer
- Teodor Stamati (1812–1852), physicist and mathematician
- Anton Velini (1812–1873), professor of philosophy, pedagogue

== See also ==
- Academia Vasiliană
- The Princely Academy
- Alexandru Ioan Cuza University
- Gheorghe Asachi Technical University

== Sources ==
- Academia Mihaileană – Prima instituţie de învăţământ superior modern din Moldova (1835 – 1847).
- Colegiul Național - Scurt Istoric.
- Clădirea Academiei Mihăilene sub iminenţa demolării. Un memoriu ignorat.
