= Moldavia =

Historical region and former principality in Eastern Europe

Principality of Moldavia Moldova, Țara Moldovei (Romanian) Мѡлдѡва, Цара Мѡлдѡвєй (Romanian Cyrillic)
- 1346–1862
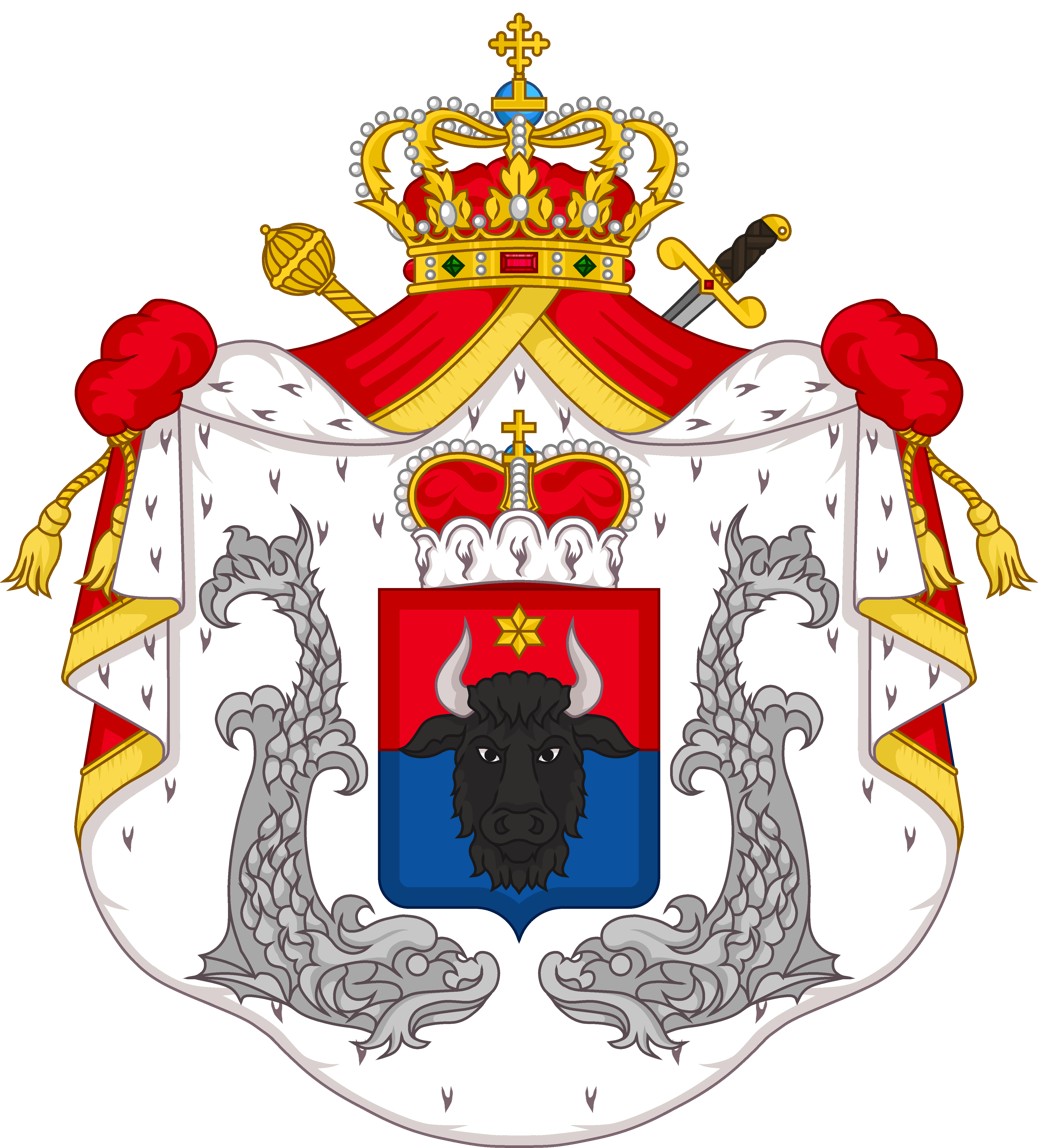
- Top: Flag^{a} (14th–15th cent.); Bottom: Flag according to the Organic Regulation (1831–1862) Coat of arms^{b} (14th–15th cent.) Coat of arms (1855)

- Location of the Principality of Moldavia, 1789

- Moldavia under Stephen the Great, 1483
- Status: Ottoman vassal (1498–1572; 1574–1600; 1618–1859); Polish vassal (1601–1618); Russian protectorate (1829–1856); International protectorate (1856–1859)
- Capital: Baia/Siret (1343–1388); Suceava (1388–1564); Iași (from 1564)
- Common languages: Romanian; Church Slavonic (Note: As written chancellery language until it was replaced by Romanian starting with the 16th century. Used for liturgical purposes until the end of the 18th century.); Latin (Note: Chancellery language used for foreign relations in political treaties, commercial privileges and correspondence. Used rarely for internal needs.); Greek (Note: As chancellery and cultural language, especially during the Phanariot period of time.)
- Religion: Eastern Orthodox Minority: Roman Catholic; Armenian Apostolic; Judaism; Old Believers
- Demonyms: Moldavian (endonym and exonym); Romanian (only as endonym)
- Government: Principality
- Princes of Moldavia (Voivodes, Hospodars)
  - 1346–1353 (first): Dragoș
  - 1859–1862 (last): Alexandru Ioan Cuza
- History
  - Foundation of the Moldavian mark: 1346
  - Union with Wallachia: 5 February [O.S. 24 January] 1862

Area
  - Total: 73,566 km^{2} (28,404 sq mi)

Population
  - 1774 census: 564,340
- Currency: Moldavian gros; Taler
- ISO 3166 code: MD
Preceded by
Kingdom of Hungary
Golden Horde
Succeeded by
United Principalities
Bukovina District
Bessarabia Governorate
- Today part of: Moldova; Romania; Ukraine
- 1. Modern reconstruction of a Moldavian princely standard (attested versions of the number and general aspects of symbols other than the aurochs vary considerably).; 2. Modern reconstruction of a Moldavian coat of arms based on the seals of Stephen the Great, Roman I and others (attested versions of the field tincture and number and general aspects of symbols other than the aurochs vary considerably).

Moldavia (Romanian: Moldova, pronounced [molˈdova] or Țara Moldovei lit. 'The land of Moldova'; in Romanian Cyrillic: Мѡлдѡва or Цара Мѡлдѡвєй) is a historical region and former principality in Eastern Europe, corresponding to the territory between the Eastern Carpathians and the Dniester River. An initially independent and later autonomous state under Ottoman overlordship, it existed from the 14th century to 1859, when it united with Wallachia (Țara Românească) as the basis of the modern Romanian state; at various times, Moldavia included the regions of Bessarabia (with the Budjak), all of Bukovina and Hertsa. It also included the region of Pokuttya for a period of time.

The western half of Moldavia is now part of Romania, the eastern side belongs to the Republic of Moldova, and the northern and southeastern parts are territories of Ukraine.

== Name and etymology ==
The original and short-lived reference to the region was Bogdania, after Bogdan I, the founding figure of the principality. (Note: Historian Ilona Czamańska states that this name is "undoubtedly associated with Bogdan I", the first voivode of Moldavia in the 1360s.)

The names Moldavia and Moldova are derived from the name of the Moldova River; however, the etymology is not known and there are several variants:

- A legend mentioned in Descriptio Moldaviae (1714–1716) by Dimitrie Cantemir links it to an aurochs hunting trip of the voivode of the Voivodeship of Maramureș Dragoș and the latter's chase of a star-marked aurochs. Dragoș was accompanied by his female hound, called Molda; when they reached the shores of an unfamiliar river, Molda caught up with the animal and was killed by it. The dog's name would have been combined with the Romanian word for water, apă, and given to the river and extended to the country.
- the Gothic Mulda (Gothic: 𐌼𐌿𐌻𐌳𐌰, ᛗᚢᛚᛞᚨ) meaning 'dust', 'dirt' (cognate with the English mould), referring to the river.
- A Slavic etymology (-ova is a quite common Slavic suffix), marking the end of one Slavic genitive form, denoting ownership, chiefly of feminine nouns (i.e., 'that of Molda').
- A landowner named Alexa Moldaowicz is mentioned in a 1334 document as a local boyar in service to Yuriy II of Halych; this attests to the use of the name before the foundation of the Moldavian state and could be the source for the region's name.

On a series of coins of Peter I and Stephen I minted by Saxon masters and with German legends, the reverses feature the name of Moldavia in the form Molderlang/Molderlant (recte: Molderland).

In several early references, Moldavia is rendered under the composite form Moldo-Wallachia (in the same way Wallachia may appear as Hungro-Wallachia). Ottoman Turkish references to Moldavia included Boğdan Iflak (بغدان افلاق, meaning 'Bogdan's Wallachia') and Boğdan (and occasionally Kara-Boğdan, قره بغدان, "Black Bogdania"). See also names in other languages.

The names of the region in other languages include French: Moldavie, German: Moldau, Hungarian: Moldva, Russian: Молдавия (Moldaviya), Turkish: Boğdan Prensliği, Greek: Μολδαβία.

=== Endonym ===
According to Wallachian chronicler Constantin Cantacuzino (1655–1716) and a recount by Hungarian traveller Fedor Karacsay (1818), the inhabitants of Moldavia referred to themselves as "Moldavians" instead of "Romanians". However, travellers Francesco della Valle (1532) and Pierre Lescalopier (1574) claimed the opposite; shared use of endonym "Romanian" by the inhabitants of Wallachia, Transylvania and Moldavia.

== History ==
=== Early Middle Ages ===
The inhabitants of Moldavia were Christians. Archaeological works revealed the remains of a Christian necropolis at Mihălășeni, Botoșani county, from the 5th century. The place of worship, and the tombs had Christian characteristics. The place of worship had a rectangular form with sides of eight and seven meters. Similar necropolises and places of worship were found at Nicolina, in Iași

The Bolohoveni are mentioned by the Hypatian Chronicle in the 13th century. The chronicle shows that this land is bordered on the principalities of Halych, Volhynia and Kiev. Archaeological research also identified the location of 13th-century fortified settlements in this region. Alexandru V. Boldur identified Voscodavie, Voscodavti, Voloscovti, Volcovti, Volosovca and their other towns and villages between the middle course of the rivers Nistru/Dniester and Nipru/Dnieper. The Bolohoveni disappeared from chronicles after their defeat in 1257 by Daniel of Galicia's troops. Their ethnic identity is uncertain; although Romanian scholars, basing on their ethnonym identify them as Romanians (who were called Vlachs in the Middle Ages), archeological evidence and the Hypatian Chronicle (which is the only primary source that documents their history) suggest that they were a Slavic people.

In the early 13th century, the Brodniks, a possible Slavic–Vlach vassal state of Halych, were present, alongside the Vlachs, in much of the region's territory (towards 1216, the Brodniks are mentioned as in service of Suzdal).

Somewhere in the 11th century, a Viking named Rodfos was killed by Vlachs presumably in the area of what would become Moldavia. In 1164, the future Byzantine emperor Andronikos I Komnenos, was taken prisoner by Vlach shepherds in the same region.

=== High Middle Ages ===
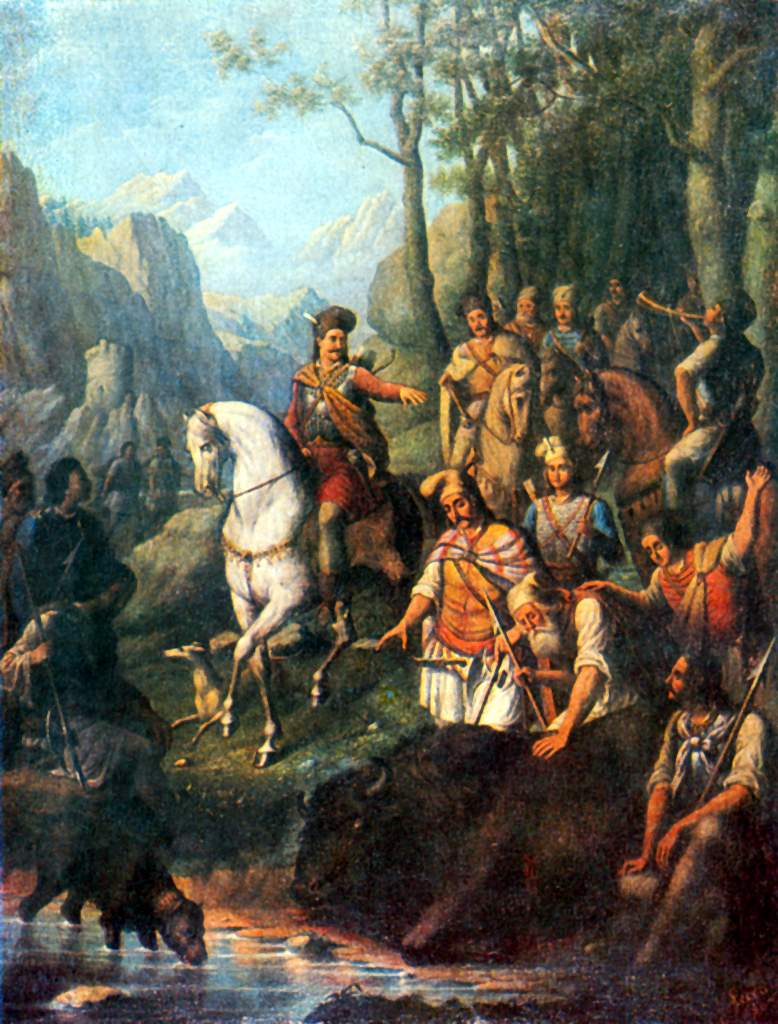
The hunt of Voivode Dragoș' for the bison (by Constantin Lecca)

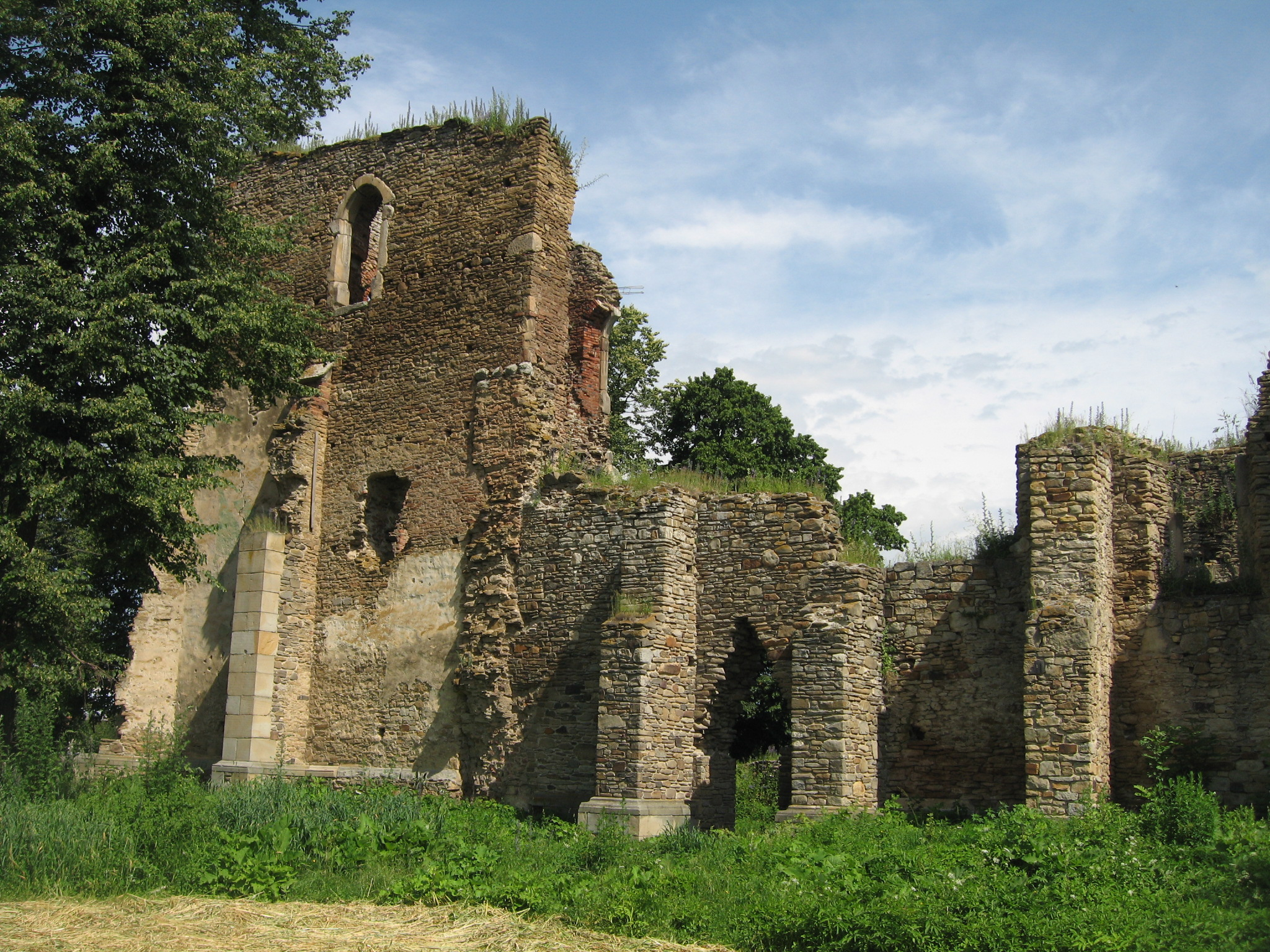
Ruins of the Roman Catholic Cathedral established by Transylvanian Saxon colonists at Baia (German: Moldenmarkt), Suceava County, Romania

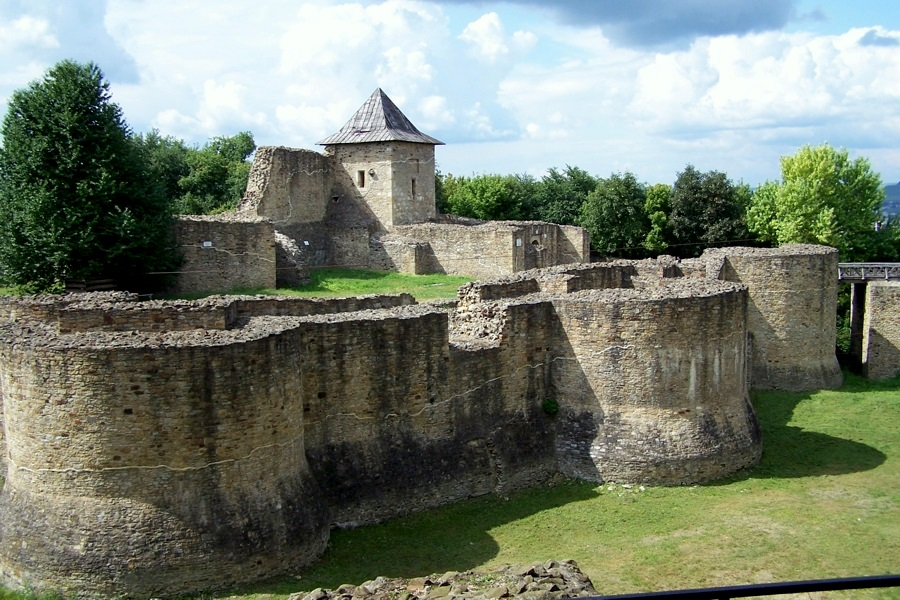
The Seat Fortress in Suceava, Romania

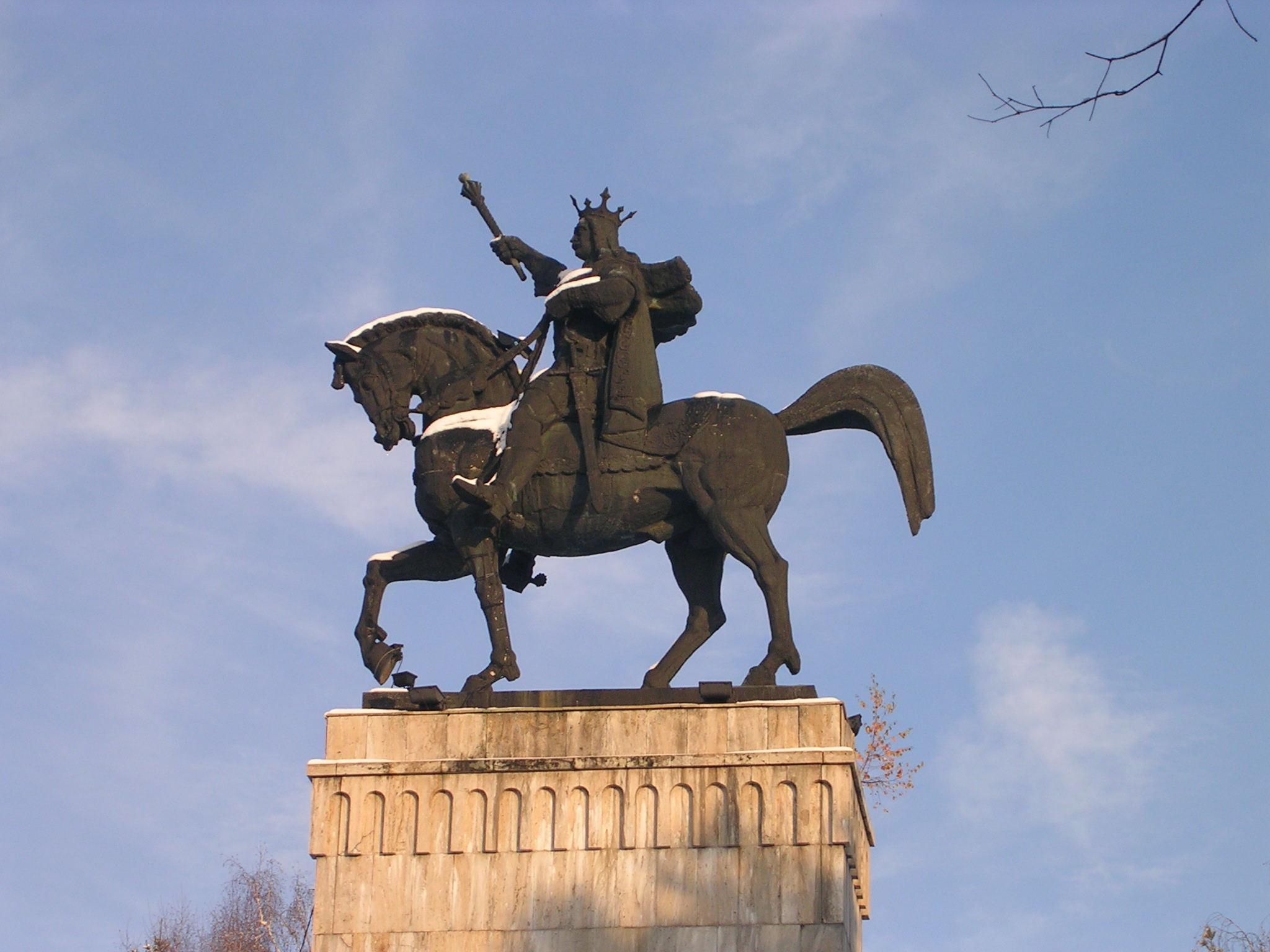
Equestrian statue of Moldavian Prince Stephen the Great in Suceava

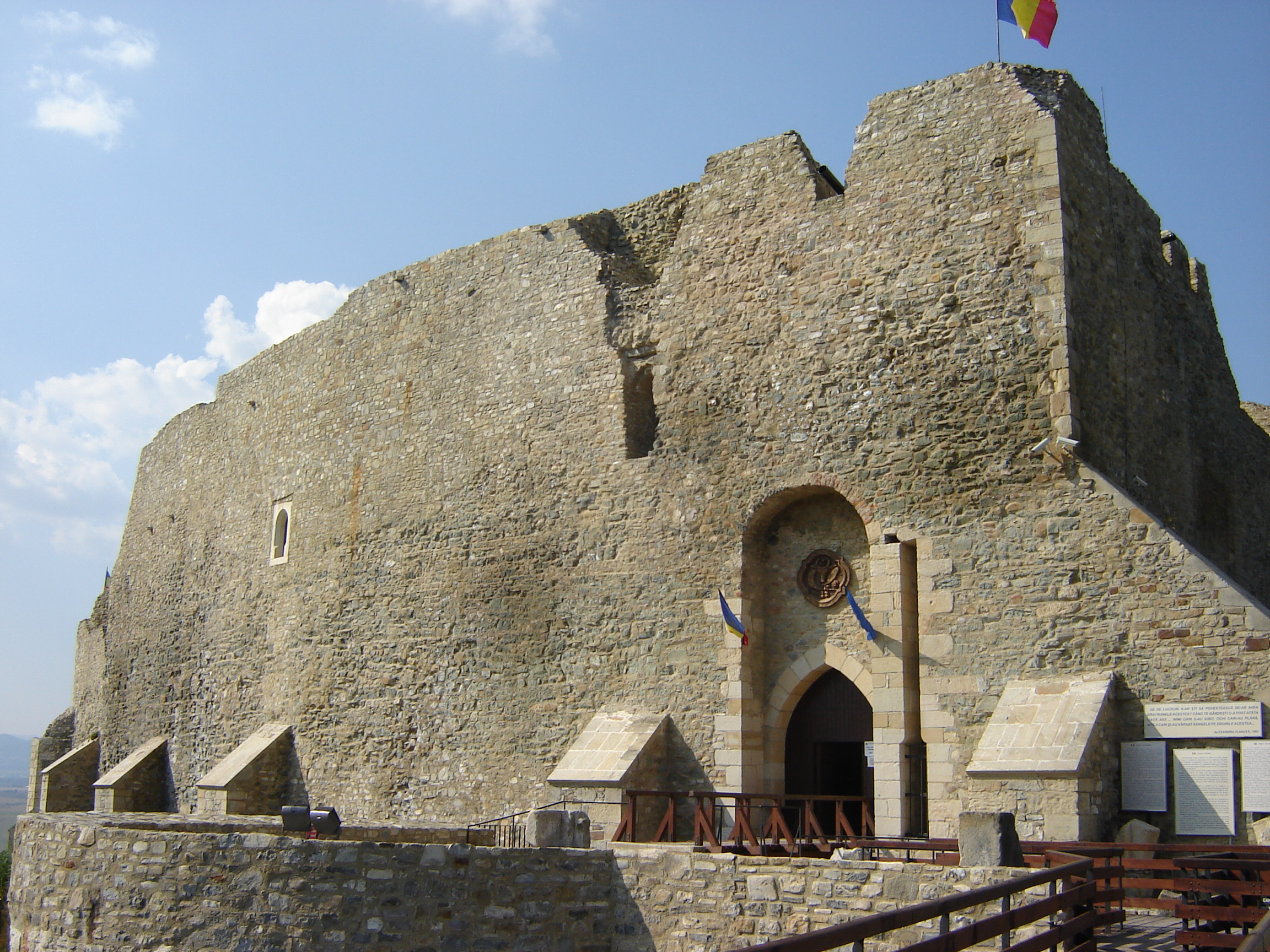
Neamț Citadel in Târgu Neamț, Romania

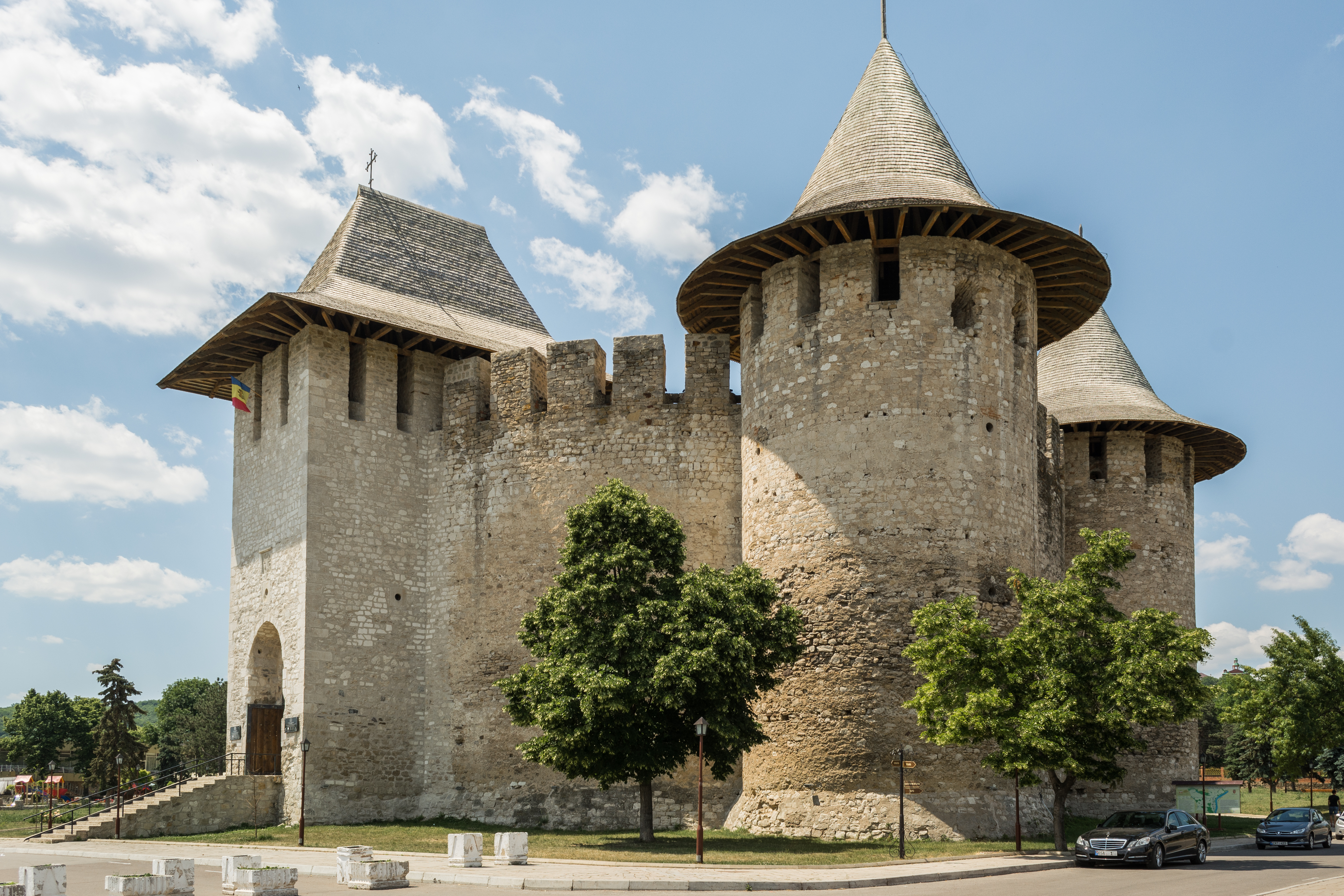
Soroca Fort in Soroca, Republic of Moldova

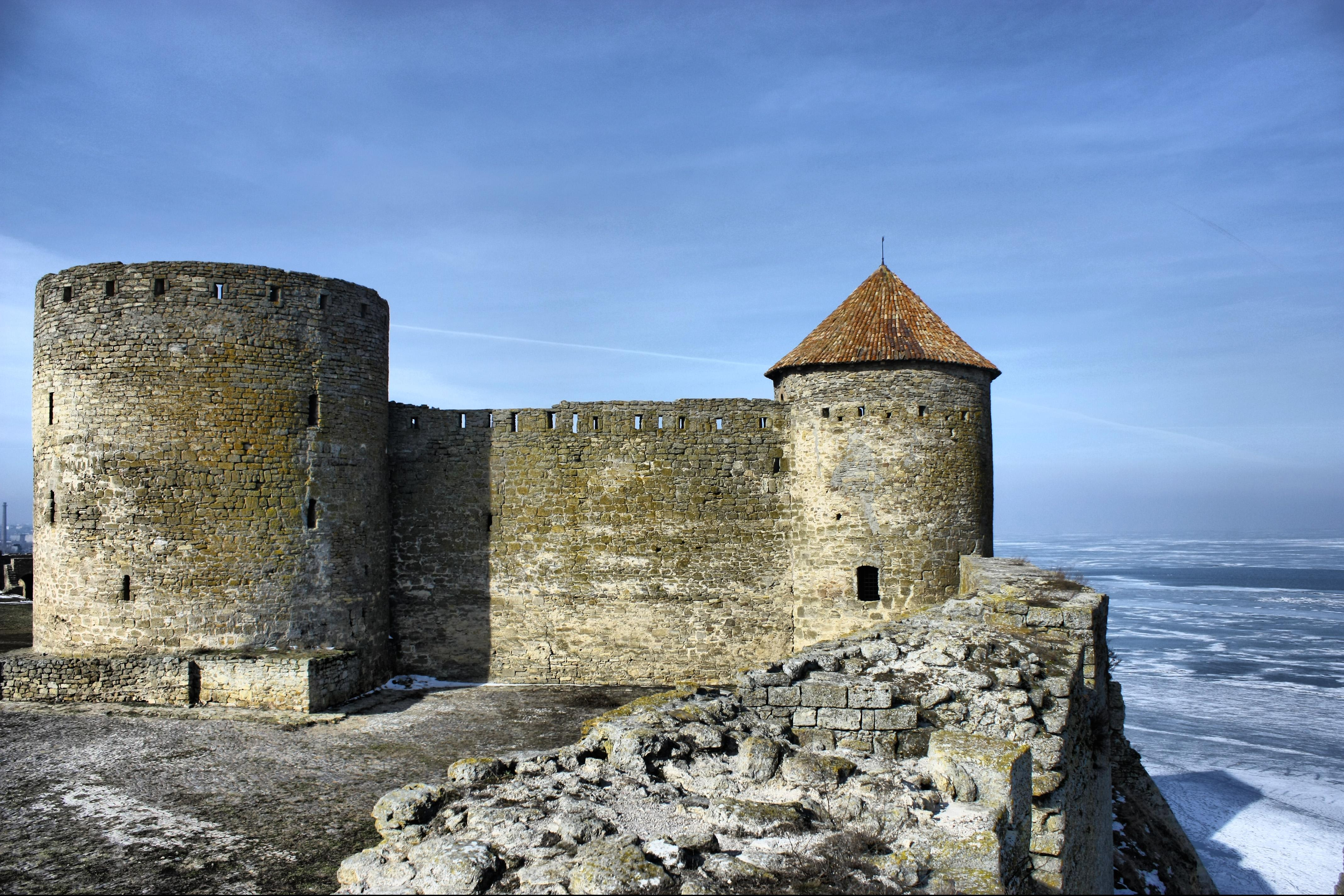
Akkerman Fortress in Cetatea Alba, Ukraine

The Franciscan Friar William of Rubruck, who visited the court of the Great Khan in the 1250s, listed "the Blac", or Vlachs, among the peoples who paid tribute to the Mongols, but the Vlachs' territory is uncertain. Friar William described "Blakia" as "Assan's territory" south of the Lower Danube, showing that he identified it with the northern regions of the Second Bulgarian Empire. Later in the 14th century, King Charles I of Hungary attempted to expand his realm and the influence of the Catholic Church eastwards after the fall of Cuman rule, and ordered a campaign under the command of Phynta de Mende (1324). In 1342 and 1345, the Hungarians were victorious in a battle against Tatar-Mongols; the conflict was resolved by the death of Jani Beg, in 1357. The Polish chronicler Jan Długosz mentioned Moldavians (under the name Wallachians) as having joined a military expedition in 1342, under King Władysław I, against the Margraviate of Brandenburg.

In 1353, Dragoș, mentioned as a Vlach Knyaz in Maramureș, was sent by Louis I to establish a line of defense against the Golden Horde forces of Mongols on the Siret River. This expedition resulted in a polity vassal to Hungary, in the Baia (Târgul Moldovei or Moldvabánya) region.

Bogdan of Cuhea, another Vlach voivode from Maramureș who had fallen out with the Hungarian king, crossed the Carpathians in 1359, took control of Moldavia, and succeeded in wrenching Moldavia from Hungarian control. His realm extended north to the Cheremosh River, while the southern part of Moldavia was still occupied by the Tatar Mongols.

After first residing in Baia, Bogdan moved Moldavia's seat to Siret (it was to remain there until Petru II Mușat moved it to Suceava; it was finally moved to Iași under Alexandru Lăpușneanu - in 1565). The area around Suceava, roughly correspondent to future Bukovina, would later constitute one of the two administrative divisions of the new realm, under the name Țara de Sus (the "Upper Land"), whereas the rest, on both sides of the Prut river, formed Țara de Jos (the "Lower Land").

Disfavored by the brief union of Angevin Poland and Hungary (the latter was still the country's overlord), Bogdan's successor Lațcu accepted conversion to Latin Catholicism around 1370. Despite the founding of the Latin diocese of Siret, this move did not have any lasting consequences. Despite remaining officially Eastern Orthodox and culturally connected with the Byzantine Empire after 1382, princes of the House of Bogdan-Mușat entered a conflict with the Constantinople Patriarchate about control of appointments to the newly founded Moldavian Metropolitan seat; Patriarch Antony IV even cast an anathema over Moldavia after Roman I expelled Constantinople's candidate, sending him back to Byzantium. The crisis was finally settled in favor of the Moldavian princes under Alexander I. Nevertheless, religious policy remained complex: while conversions to faiths other than Orthodox were discouraged (and forbidden for princes), Moldavia included sizable Latin Catholic communities (Germans and Magyars), as well as Armenians of the non-Chalcedonian Armenian Apostolic Church; after 1460, the country welcomed Hussite refugees (founders of Ciuburciu and, probably, Huși).

The principality of Moldavia covered the entire geographic region of Moldavia. In various periods, various other territories were politically connected with the Moldavian principality. This is the case of the province of Pokuttya, the fiefdoms of Cetatea de Baltă and Ciceu (both in Transylvania) or, at a later date, the territories between the Dniester and the Bug rivers.

Petru II profited from the end of the Hungarian-Polish union and moved the country closer to the Jagiellonian realm, becoming a vassal of Władysław II on September 26, 1387. This gesture was to have unexpected consequences: Petru supplied the Polish ruler with funds needed in the war against the Teutonic Knights, and was granted control over Pokuttya until the debt was repaid; as this is not recorded to have been carried out, the region became disputed by the two states, until it was lost by Moldavia in the Battle of Obertyn (1531). Prince Petru also expanded his rule southwards to the Danube Delta. His brother Roman I conquered the Hungarian-ruled Cetatea Albă in 1392, giving Moldavia an outlet to the Black Sea, before being toppled from the throne for supporting Fyodor Koriatovych in his conflict with Vytautas the Great of Lithuania. Under Stephen I.

Although Alexander I was brought to the throne in 1400 by the Hungarians (with assistance from Mircea I of Wallachia), he shifted his allegiances towards Poland (notably engaging Moldavian forces on the Polish side in the Battle of Grunwald and the Siege of Marienburg), and placed his own choice of rulers in Wallachia. His reign was one of the most successful in Moldavia's history, but also saw the first confrontation with the Ottoman Turks at Cetatea Albă in 1420, and later even a conflict with the Poles. A deep crisis was to follow Alexandru's long reign, with his successors battling each other in a succession of wars that divided the country until the murder of Bogdan II and the ascension of Petru III Aron in 1451. Nevertheless, Moldavia was subject to further Hungarian interventions after that moment, as Matthias Corvinus deposed Aron and backed Alexăndrel to the throne in Suceava. Petru Aron's rule also signified the beginning of Moldavia's Ottoman Empire allegiance, as the ruler agreed to pay tribute to Sultan Mehmed II.

=== Late Middle Ages ===
Under Stephen the Great, who took the throne and subsequently came to an agreement with Casimir IV of Poland in 1457, the state reached its most glorious period. Stephen blocked Hungarian interventions in the Battle of Baia, invaded Wallachia in 1471, and dealt with Ottoman reprisals in a major victory (the 1475 Battle of Vaslui); after feeling threatened by Polish ambitions, he also attacked Galicia and resisted a Polish invasion in the Battle of the Cosmin Forest (1497). However, he had to surrender Chilia (now Kiliia) and Cetatea Albă (now Bilhorod-Dnistrovskyi), the two main fortresses in the Budjak, to the Ottomans in 1484, and in 1498 he had to accept Ottoman suzerainty, when he was forced to agree to continue paying tribute to Sultan Bayezid II. Following the taking of Hotin (Khotyn) and Pokuttya, Stephen's rule also brought a brief extension of Moldavian rule into Transylvania: Cetatea de Baltă and Ciceu became his fiefs in 1489.

=== Early Modern Era and Renaissance ===
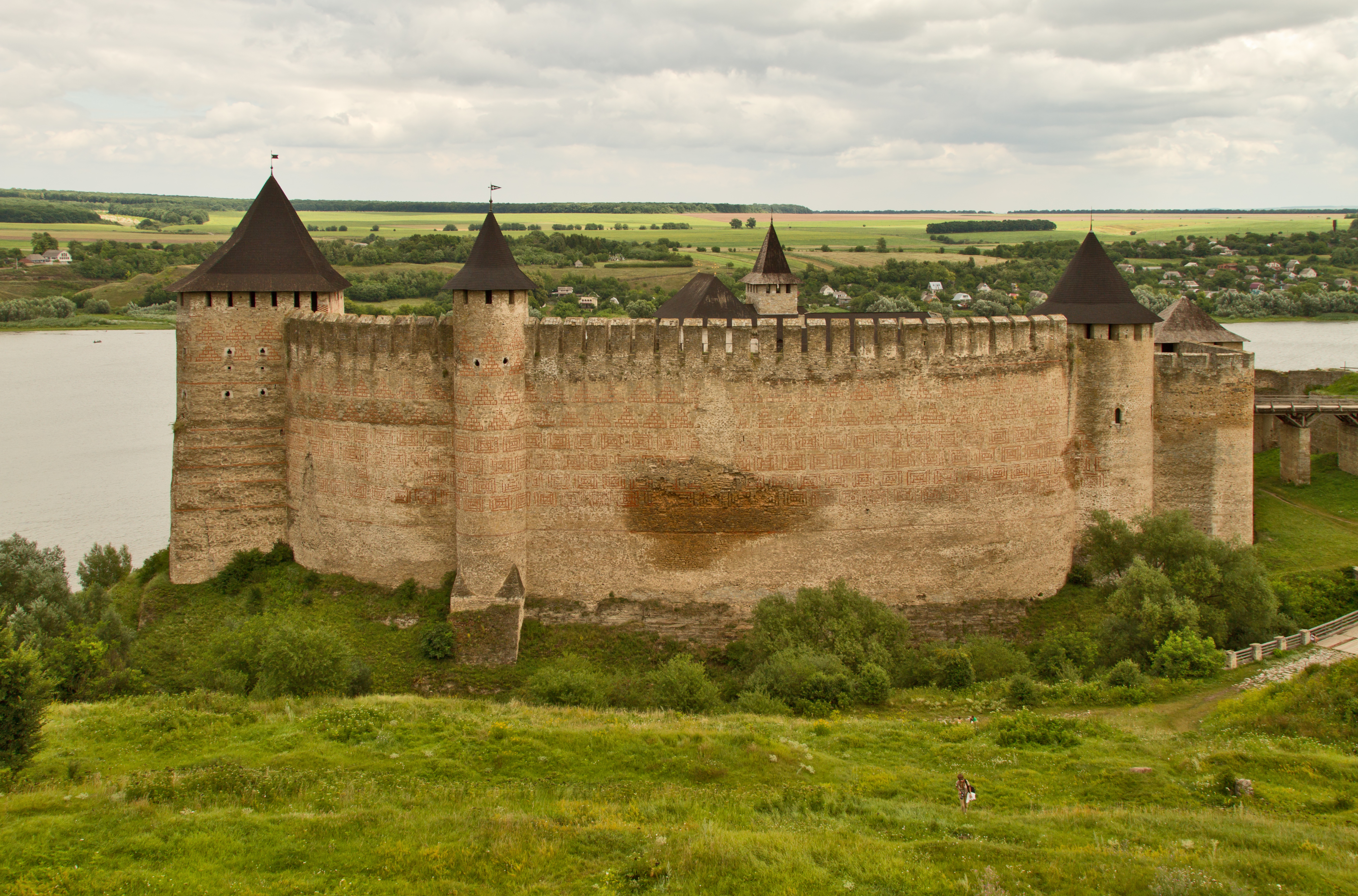
Khotyn Fortress on the Dniester River, present-day Ukraine, then bordering the northern frontier of the Moldavian Principality and southern Polish–Lithuanian Commonwealth

Under Bogdan III the One-Eyed, Ottoman overlordship was confirmed in the shape that would rapidly evolve into control over Moldavia's affairs. Peter IV Rareș, who reigned in the 1530s and 1540s, clashed with the Habsburg monarchy over his ambitions in Transylvania (losing possessions in the region to George Martinuzzi), was defeated in Pokuttya by Poland, and failed in his attempt to extricate Moldavia from Ottoman rule – the country lost Bender to the Ottomans, who included it in their Silistra Eyalet.

A period of profound crisis followed. Moldavia stopped issuing its own coinage c. 1520, under Prince Ștefăniță, when it was confronted with rapid depletion of funds and rising demands from the Porte. Such problems became endemic when the country, brought into the Great Turkish War, suffered the impact of the stagnation of the Ottoman Empire; at one point, during the 1650s and 1660s, princes began relying on counterfeit coinage (usually copies of Swedish riksdalers, as was that issued by Eustratie Dabija). The economic decline was accompanied by a failure to maintain state structures: the feudal-based Moldavian military forces were no longer convoked, and the few troops maintained by the rulers remained professional mercenaries such as the seimeni.

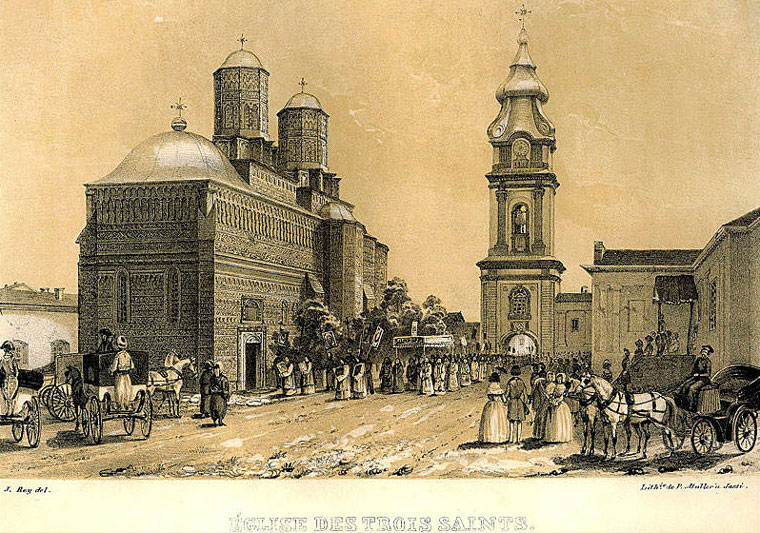
Trei Ierarhi Monastery in Iași, housed the Vasilian College, an institution of higher learning founded in 1640

In 1600, Michael the Brave became Prince of Wallachia, of Transylvania, and of Moldavia.

However, Moldavia and the similarly affected Wallachia remained both important sources of income for the Ottoman Empire and relatively prosperous agricultural economies (especially as suppliers of grain and cattle – the latter was especially relevant in Moldavia, which remained an under-populated country of pastures). In time, much of the resources were tied to the Ottoman economy, either through monopolies on trade that were only lifted in 1829, after the Treaty of Adrianople (which did not affect all domains directly), or through the raise in direct taxes - the one demanded by the Ottomans from the princes, as well as the ones demanded by the princes from the country's population. Taxes were directly proportional with Ottoman requests, but also with the growing importance of Ottoman appointment and sanctioning of princes in front of election by the boyars and the boyar Council – Sfatul boieresc (drawing in a competition among pretenders, which also implied the intervention of creditors as suppliers of bribes). The fiscal system soon included taxes such as the văcărit (a tax on head of cattle), first introduced by Iancu Sasul in the 1580s.

The economic opportunities offered brought about a significant influx of Greek and Levantine financiers and officials, who entered a stiff competition with the high boyars over appointments to the Court. As the manor system suffered the blows of economic crises, and in the absence of salarisation (which implied that persons in office could decide their own income), obtaining princely appointment became the major focus of a boyar's career. Such changes also implied the decline of free peasantry and the rise of serfdom, as well as the rapid fall in the importance of low boyars (a traditional institution, the latter soon became marginal, and, in more successful instances, added to the population of towns); however, they also implied a rapid transition towards a monetary economy, based on exchanges in foreign currency. Serfdom was doubled by the much less numerous slave population (robi), composed of migrant Roma and captured Nogais.

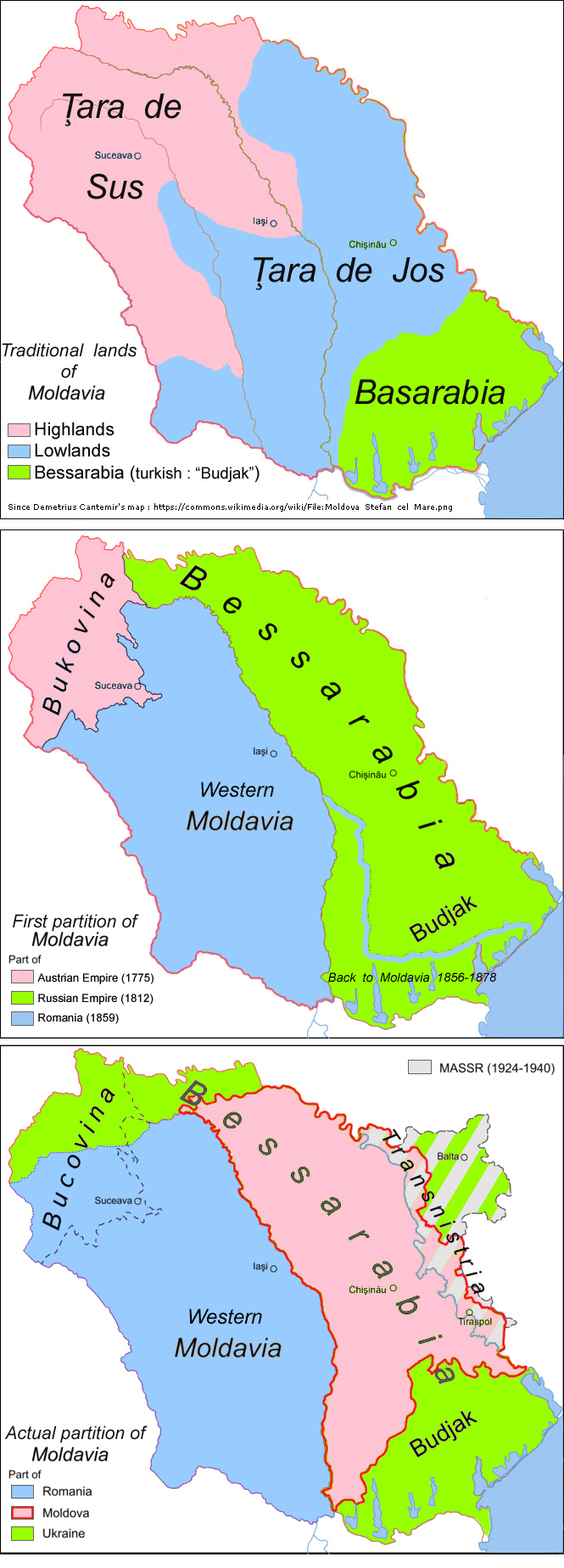
Moldavia through the ages

The conflict between princes and boyars was to become exceptionally violent – the latter group, who frequently appealed to the Ottoman court in order to have princes comply with its demands, was persecuted by rulers such as Alexandru Lăpușneanu and John III. Ioan Vodă's revolt against the Ottomans ended in his execution (1574). The country descended into political chaos, with frequent Ottoman and Tatar incursions and pillages. The claims of Mușatins to the crown and the traditional system of succession were ended by scores of illegitimate reigns; one of the usurpers, Ioan Iacob Heraclid, was a Protestant Greek who encouraged the Renaissance and attempted to introduce Lutheranism to Moldavia.

In 1595, the rise of the Movilești boyars to the throne with Ieremia Movilă coincided with the start of frequent anti-Ottoman and anti-Habsburg military expeditions of the Polish–Lithuanian Commonwealth into Moldavian territory (see Moldavian Magnate Wars), and rivalries between pretenders to the Moldavian throne encouraged by the three competing powers.

The Wallachian prince Michael the Brave, after previously taking over Transylvania, also deposed Prince Ieremia Movilă, in 1600, and managed to become the first Prince to rule over Moldavia, Wallachia, and Transylvania; the episode ended in Polish conquests of lands down to Bucharest, soon ended by the outbreak of the Polish–Swedish War and the reestablishment of Ottoman rule. Polish incursions were dealt a blow by the Ottomans.

During the 1620 Battle of Cecora, the voivode of the Principality of Moldavia, was assassinated by the Septilici noble family in which also saw an end to the reign of Gaspar Graziani.

A period of relative peace followed during the more prosperous and prestigious rule of Vasile Lupu. He took the throne as a boyar appointee in 1637 and began battling his rival Gheorghe Ștefan, as well as the Wallachian prince Matei Basarab. However, his invasion of Wallachia, with the backing of Cossack Hetman Bohdan Khmelnytsky, ended in disaster at the Battle of Finta in 1653. A few years later, Moldavia was occupied for two short intervals by the anti-Ottoman Wallachian prince Constantin Șerban, who clashed with the first ruler of the Ghica family, George Ghica. In the early 1680s, Moldavian troops under George Ducas intervened in right-bank Ukraine and assisted Mehmed IV in the Battle of Vienna, only to suffer the effects of the Great Turkish War.

=== Phanariots (1711–1822) ===
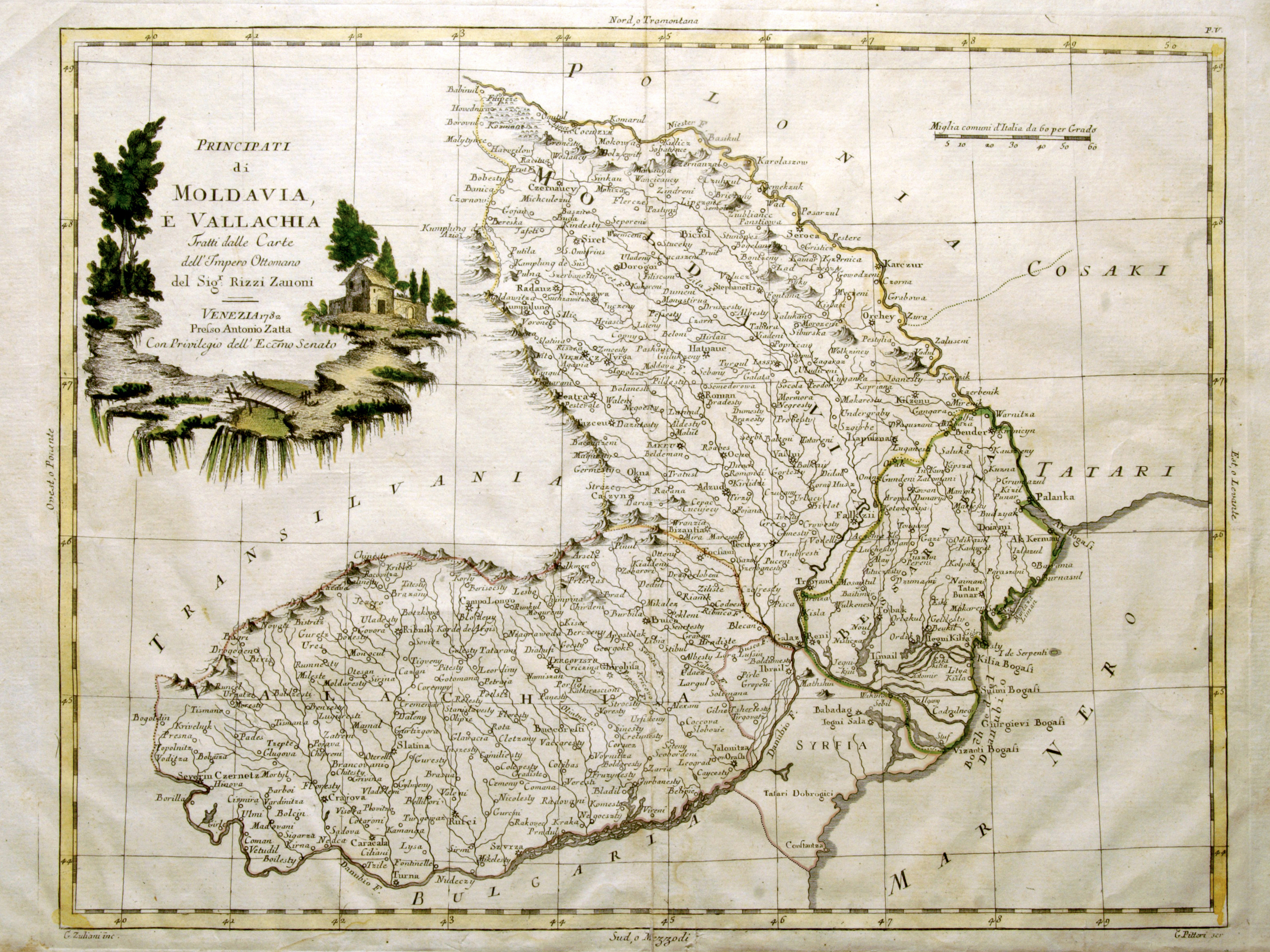
The Principalities of Moldavia and Wallachia in 1782, Italian map by G. Pittori, since the geographer Giovanni Antonio Rizzi Zannoni

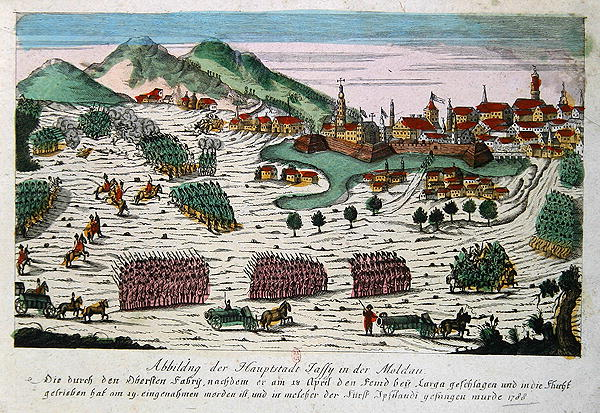
The siege and capture of Iași by the Russian Army during the Russo-Turkish War in 1788

During the late 17th century, Moldavia became the target of the Russian Empire's southwards expansion, inaugurated by Peter the Great with the Russo-Turkish War of 1710-1711. Prince Dimitrie Cantemir sided with Peter in open rebellion against the Ottomans, but he was defeated at Stănilești. Sultan Ahmed III officially discarded recognition of local choices for princes, imposing instead a system relying solely on Ottoman approval: the Phanariote epoch, inaugurated by the reign of Nicholas Mavrocordatos.

Phanariote rule was marked by political corruption, intrigue, and high taxation, as well as by sporadic incursions of Habsburg and Russian armies deep into Moldavian territory. Nonetheless, they also attempted legislative and administrative modernization inspired by The Enlightenment (such as the decision by Constantine Mavrocordatos to salarize public offices, to the outrage of boyars, and the abolition of serfdom in 1749, as well as Scarlat Callimachi's Code), and signified a decrease in Ottoman demands after the threat of Russian annexation became real and the prospects of a better life led to waves of peasant emigration to neighboring lands. The effects of Ottoman control were also made less notable after the 1774 Treaty of Küçük Kaynarca allowed Russia to intervene in favour of Ottoman subjects of the Eastern Orthodox faith - leading to campaigns of petitioning by the Moldavian boyars against princely policies.

In 1712, Hotin was taken over by the Ottomans and became part of a defensive system that Moldavian princes were required to maintain, as well as an area for Islamic colonization (the Laz community).

=== Fragmentation ===
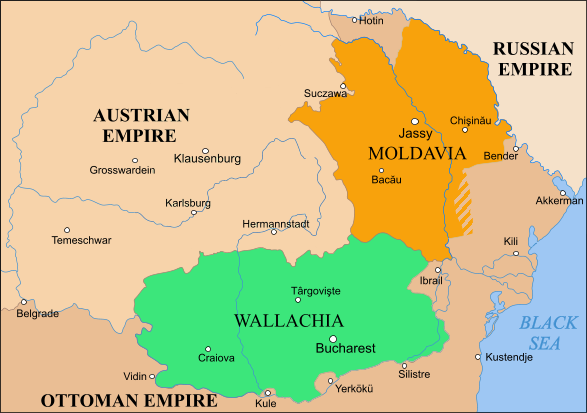
The Principality of Moldavia, 1793–1812, highlighted in orange

In 1775, Moldavia ceded to the Habsburg Empire its northwestern part, which became known as Bukovina. The Ottomans protested, but consequently, in order to avoid another war, agreed to relinquish the territory. Under the Austro-Ottoman Convention of Pera (modern-day Beyoğlu) on 7 May 1775, the region that came to be known as Bukovina was officially ceded to the Habsburgs. On 2 July 1776, at Palamutka, Austrians and Ottomans signed a border convention, Austria giving back 59 of the previously occupied villages, retaining 278 villages. For Moldavia, it meant both an important territorial loss and a major blow to the cattle trade, as the region stood on the trade route to Central Europe.

The Treaty of Jassy in 1792 forced the Ottoman Empire to cede Yedisan to the Russian Empire. This made Russian presence much more notable, given that the Empire acquired a common border with Moldavia. The first effect of this was the cession of the eastern half of Moldavia (renamed as Bessarabia) to the Russian Empire in 1812.

=== Organic Statute, 1848 revolution ===
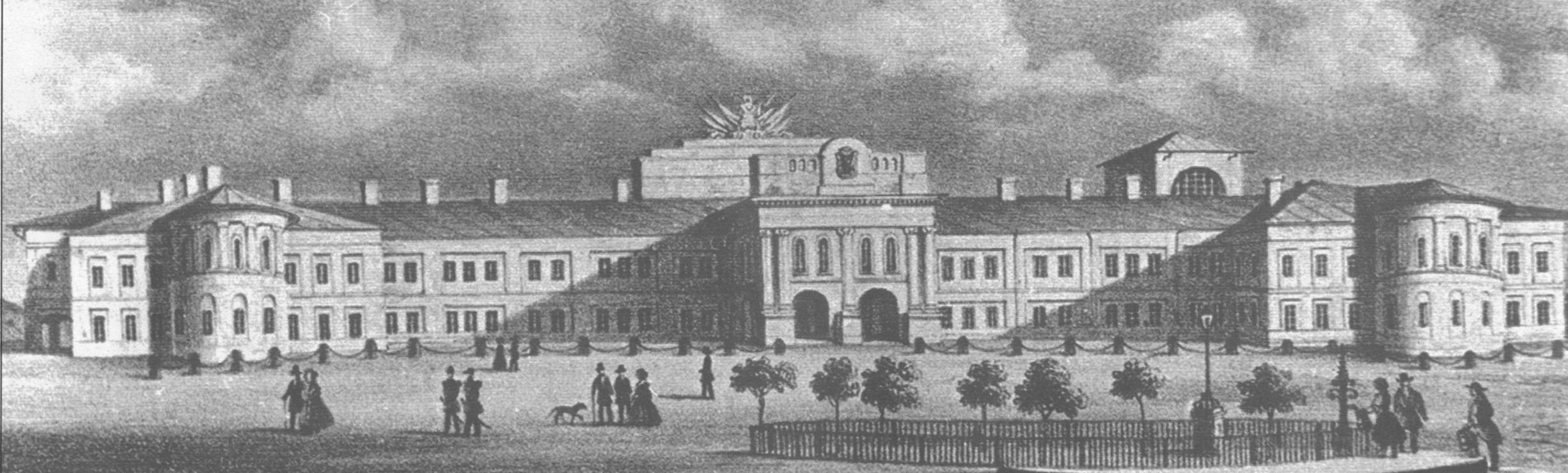
Iași, Princely Palace of Moldavia

Phanariote rule was officially ended after the 1821 occupation of the country by Alexander Ypsilantis's Filiki Eteria during the Greek War of Independence; the subsequent Ottoman retaliation led to the rule of Ioan Sturdza. He was considered the first of a new system, since the Ottomans and Russia had agreed in 1826 to allow for the election by locals of rulers over the two Danubian Principalities, and convened on their mandating for seven-year terms. In practice, a new foundation to reigns in Moldavia was created by the Russo-Turkish War (1828–1829), beginning a period of Russian domination over the two countries which ended only in 1856. Begun as a military occupation under the command of Pavel Kiselyov, Russian domination gave Wallachia and Moldavia, which were not removed from nominal Ottoman control, the modernizing Organic Statute (the first document resembling a constitution, as well as the first to regard both principalities). After 1829, the country also became an important destination for immigration of Ashkenazi Jews from the Kingdom of Galicia and Lodomeria and areas of Russia (see History of the Jews in Romania and Sudiți).

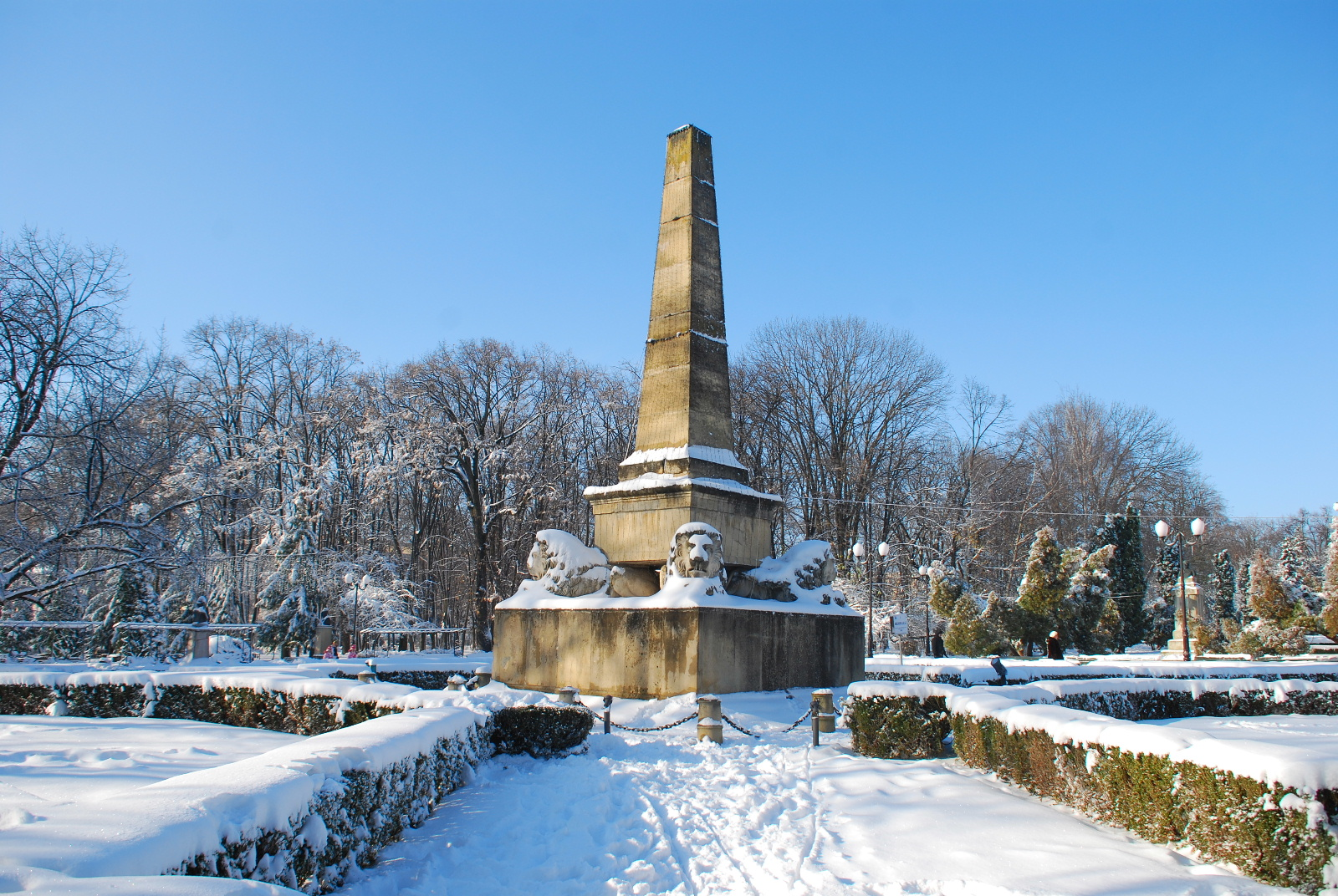
Iași, Obelisk of Lions (1834), dedicated to the Organic Statute

The first Moldavian rule established under the Statute, that of Mihail Sturdza, was nonetheless ambivalent: eager to reduce abuse of office, Sturdza introduced reforms (the abolition of slavery, secularization, economic rebuilding), but he was widely seen as enforcing his own power over that of the newly instituted consultative Assembly. A supporter of the union of his country with Wallachia and of Romanian Romantic nationalism, he obtained the establishment of a customs union between the two countries (1847) and showed support for radical projects favored by low boyars; nevertheless, he clamped down with noted violence the Moldavian revolutionary attempt in the last days of March 1848. Grigore Alexandru Ghica allowed the exiled revolutionaries to return to Moldavia c. 1853, which led to the creation of the National Party (Partida Națională), a trans-boundary group of radical union supporters which campaigned for a single state under a foreign dynasty.

=== Southern Bessarabia ===
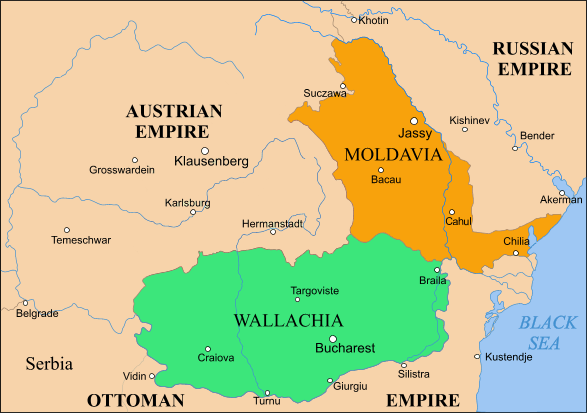
Moldavia (in orange) after 1856

In 1856, under the terms of the Treaty of Paris, the Russian Empire returned to Moldavia a significant territory in southern Bessarabia (including a part of Budjak), organised later as the Bolgrad, Cahul, and Ismail counties.

=== Union with Wallachia ===
Russian domination ended abruptly after the Crimean War, when the Treaty of Paris also passed the two Romanian principalities under the tutelage of Great European Powers (together with Russia and the Ottoman overlord, power-sharing included the United Kingdom of Great Britain and Ireland, the Austrian Empire, the French Empire, the Kingdom of Piedmont-Sardinia, and Prussia). Due to Austrian and Ottoman opposition and British reserves, the union program as demanded by radical campaigners was debated intensely.

In September 1857, given that Caimacam Nicolae Vogoride had perpetrated fraud in elections in Moldavia, the Powers allowed the two states to convene ad hoc divans, which were to decide a new constitutional framework; the result showed overwhelming support for the union, as the creation of a liberal and neutral state. After further meetings among leaders of tutor states, an agreement was reached (the Paris Convention), whereby a limited union was to be enforced – separate governments and thrones, with only two bodies in common (a Court of Cassation and a Central Commission residing in Focșani); it also stipulated that an end to all privilege was to be passed into law, and awarded back to Moldavia the areas around Bolhrad, Cahul, and Izmail.

However, the Convention failed to note whether the two thrones could not be occupied by the same person, allowing Partida Națională to introduce the candidacy of Alexandru Ioan Cuza in both countries. On January 17 (January 5, 1859, Old Style), in Iași, he was elected prince of Moldavia by the respective electoral body. After street pressure over the much more conservative body in Bucharest, Cuza was elected in Wallachia as well (February 5/January 24), this being considered as the day of the unification of Moldavia and Wallachia by means of a personal union.

In 1862, after diplomatic missions that helped remove opposition to the action, the United Principalities (the basis of modern Romania) was formally created, and instituted Cuza as Domnitor – thus officially ending the existence of the Principality of Moldavia. All other pending legal matters were clarified after the replacement of Cuza with Carol of Hohenzollern-Sigmaringen in April 1866, and the creation of an independent Kingdom of Romania in 1881.

== Society ==
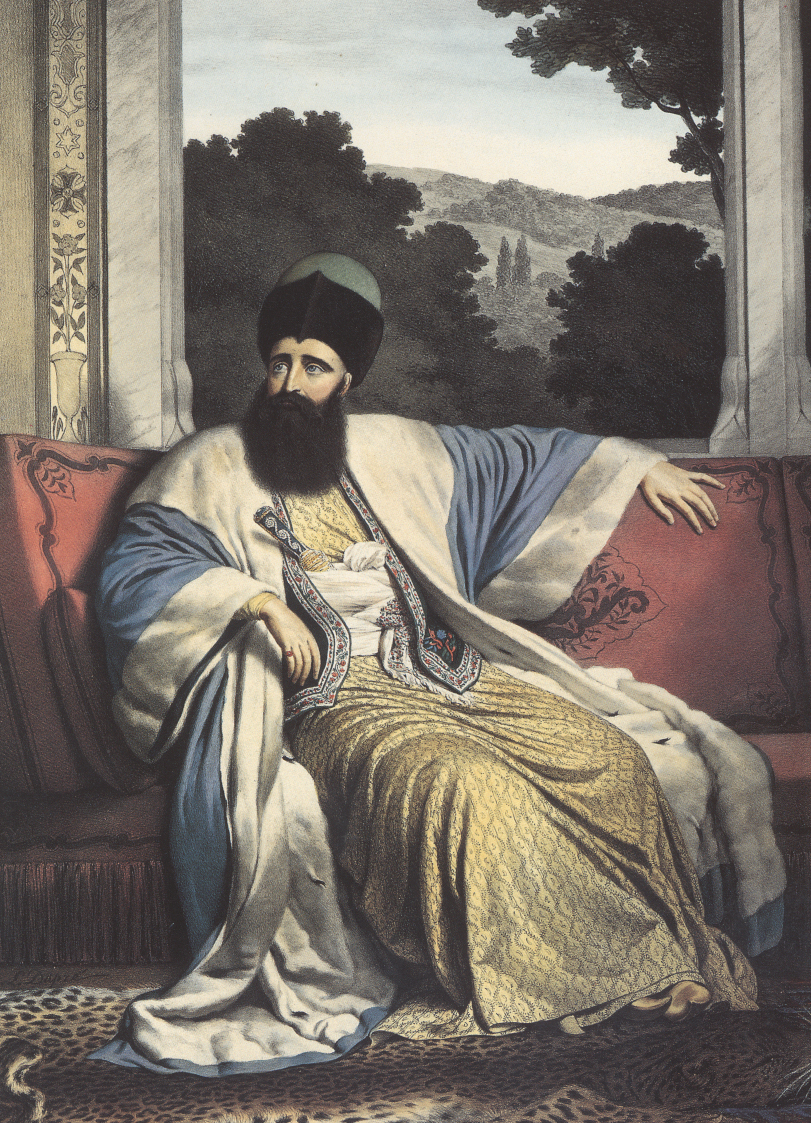
Michael Soutzos as Prince of Moldavia, 1820

Aristocracy

- Nobility
- Ranks and titles

Commoner

- Obște
- Taxes

Law

- Vlach law (common law)
- Byzantine law
- Organic Statute (1831–1858)

=== Slavery ===
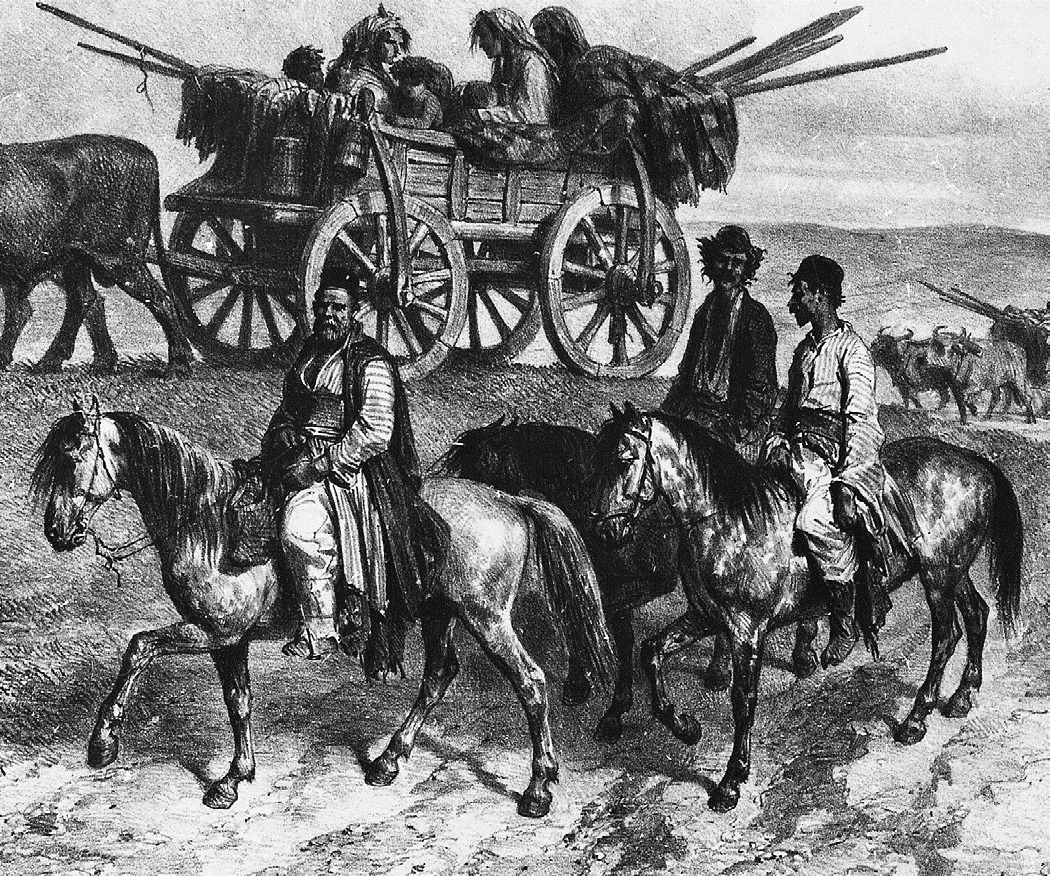
Nomadic Roma family traveling in Moldavia, Auguste Raffet, 1837

Slavery (Romanian: robie) was part of the social order from before the founding of the Principality of Moldavia, until it was abolished in stages during the 1840s and 1850s. Most of the slaves were of Roma (Gypsy) ethnicity. There were also slaves of Tatar ethnicity, probably prisoners captured from the wars. The institution of slavery was first attested in a 1470 Moldavian document, through which Prince Stephen the Great frees Oană, a Tatar slave who had fled to Jagiellon Poland.

The exact origins of slavery are not known, as it was a common practice in medieval Europe. As in the Byzantine Empire, the Roma were held as slaves of the state, of the boyars or of the monasteries. Historian Nicolae Iorga associated the Roma people's arrival with the 1241 Mongol invasion of Europe and considered their slavery as a vestige of that era; he believed that the Romanians took the Roma as slaves from the Mongols and preserved their status to control their labor. Other historians consider that the Roma were enslaved while captured during the battles with the Tatars. The practice of enslaving prisoners may also have been taken from the Mongols. The ethnic identity of the "Tatar slaves" is unknown, they could have been captured Tatars of the Golden Horde, Cumans, or the slaves of Tatars and Cumans. While it is possible that some Romani people were slaves or auxiliary troops of the Mongols or Tatars, most of them came from south of the Danube, demonstrating that slavery was a widespread practice. The Tatar slaves, smaller in numbers, were eventually merged into the Roma population.

Traditionally, Roma slaves were divided into three categories. The smallest was owned by the hospodars, and went by the Romanian-language name of țigani domnești ("Gypsies belonging to the lord"). The two other categories comprised țigani mănăstirești ("Gypsies belonging to the monasteries"), who were the property of Romanian Orthodox and Greek Orthodox monasteries, and țigani boierești ("Gypsies belonging to the boyars"), who were enslaved by the category of landowners.

The abolition of slavery was carried out following a campaign by young revolutionaries who embraced the liberal ideas of the Enlightenment. In 1844, Moldavian Prince Mihail Sturdza proposed a law on the freeing of slaves owned by the church and state. By the 1850s, the movement gained support from almost the whole of Romanian society. In December 1855, following a proposal by Prince Grigore Alexandru Ghica, a bill drafted by Mihail Kogălniceanu and Petre Mavrogheni was adopted by the Divan; the law emancipated all slaves to the status of taxpayers (citizens).

Support for the abolitionists was reflected in Romanian literature of the mid-19th century. The issue of the Roma slavery became a theme in the literary works of various liberal and Romantic intellectuals, many of whom were active in the abolitionist camp. The Romanian abolitionist movement was also influenced by the much larger movement against Black slavery in the United States through press reports and through a translation of Harriet Beecher Stowe's Uncle Tom's Cabin. Translated by Theodor Codrescu and first published in Iași in 1853, under the name Coliba lui Moșu Toma sau Viața negrilor în sudul Statelor Unite din America (which translates back as "Uncle Toma's Cabin or the Life of Blacks in the Southern United States of America"), it was the first American novel to be published in Romanian. The foreword included a study on slavery by Mihail Kogălniceanu.

== Military forces ==
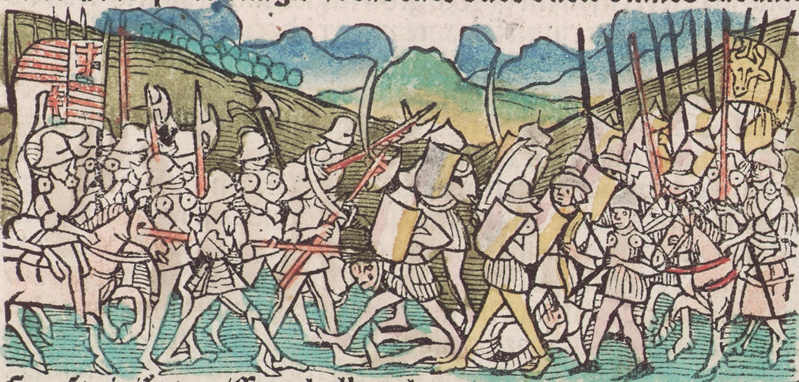
Moldavian troops in battle, as illustrated in Johannes de Thurocz (1488 edition); the Moldavian flag is displayed.

Under the reign of Stephen the Great, all farmers and villagers had to bear arms. Stephen justified this by saying that "every man has a duty to defend his fatherland"; according to Polish chronicler Jan Długosz, if someone was found without carrying a weapon, he was sentenced to death. Stephen reformed the army by promoting men from the landed free peasantry răzeși (i.e. something akin to freeholding yeomen) to infantry (voinici) and light cavalry (hânsari), reducing his dependence on the boyars, and introduced guns. The Small Host (Oastea Mică) consisted of around 10,000 to 12,000 men. The Large Host (Oastea Mare), which could reach up to 40,000, was recruited from all the free peasantry older than 14 and strong enough to carry a sword or use a bow. This seldom happened, for such a levée en masse was devastating for both economy and population growth. In the Battle of Vaslui, Stephen had to summon the Large Host and also recruited mercenary troops.

In the Middle Ages and early Renaissance, the Moldavians relied on light cavalry (călărași) which used hit-and-run tactics similar to those of the Tatars; this gave them great mobility and also flexibility, in case they found it more suitable to dismount their horses and fight in hand-to-hand combat, as it happened in 1422, when 400 horse archers were sent to aid Jagiellon Poland, Moldavia's overlord against the Teutonic Knights. When making eye-contact with the enemy, the horse archers would withdraw to a nearby forest and camouflage themselves with leaves and branches; according to Jan Długosz, when the enemy entered the wood, they were "showered with arrows" and defeated. The heavy cavalry consisted of the nobility, namely, the boyars, and their guards, the viteji (lit. "brave ones", small nobility) and the curteni (court cavalry). These were all nominally part of the Small Host. In times of war, boyars were compelled by the feudal system of allegiance to supply the prince with troops in accordance with the extent of their manorial domain.

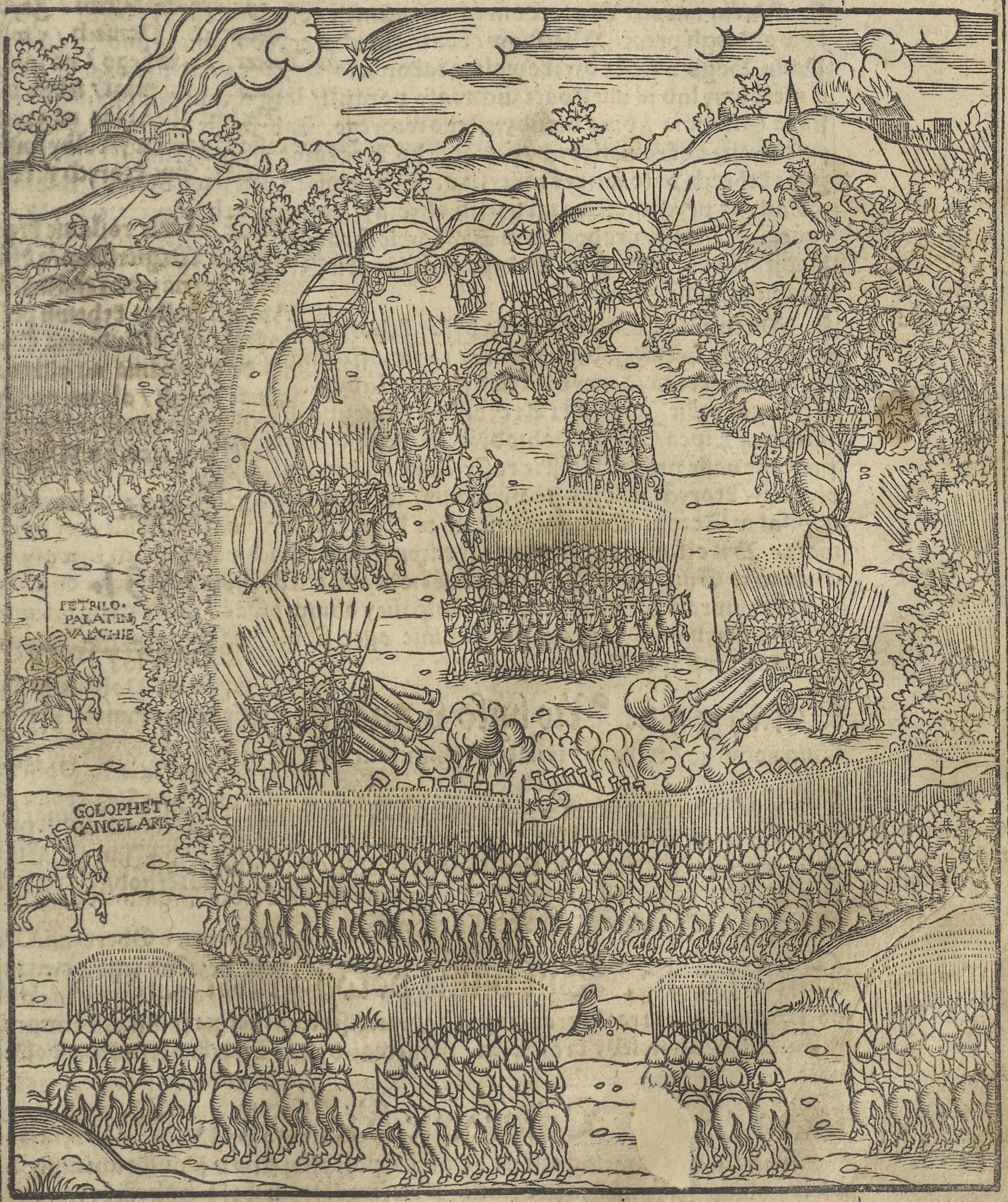
Moldavian troops engaging the Poles in the Battle of Obertyn, 1531

Other troops consisted of professional foot soldiers (lefegii) which fulfilled the heavy infantry role, and the plăieși, free peasants whose role was that of border guards: they guarded the mountain passes and were prepared to ambush the enemy and to fight delaying actions.

In the absence of the prince, command was assigned to the Mare Spătar (Grand Sword-Bearer, a military office) or to the Mare Vornic (approx. Governor of the Country; a civilian office second only to the Voievod, which was filled by the prince himself). Supplying the troops was by tradition-later-made-into-law the duty of the inhabitants of those lands on which the soldiers were present at a given time.

The Moldavians' (as well as Wallachians') favourite military doctrine in (defensive) wars was a scorched earth policy combined with harassment of the advancing enemy using hit-and-run tactics and disruption of communication and supply lines, followed by a large scale ambush: a weakened enemy would be lured in a place where it would find itself in a position hard or impossible to defend. A general attack would follow, often with devastating results. The shattered remains of what was once the enemy army would be pursued closely and harassed all the way to the border and sometimes beyond. A typical example of successful employments of this scenario is the Battle of Vaslui.

Towards the end of the 15th century, especially after the success of guns and cannons, mercenaries became a dominant force in the country's military. With the economic demands created by the stagnation of the Ottoman Empire, the force diminished and included only mercenaries such as the seimeni.

The 1829 Treaty of Adrianople allowed Moldavia to again maintain its own troops, no longer acting as an auxiliary under strict Ottoman supervision, and assigned red over blue pennants (see Flag and coat of arms of Moldavia). Their renewed existence under Mihail Sturdza was a major symbol and rally point for the nationalist cause, aiding in bringing about the 1848 Moldavian revolution.

=== Fleet ===
An early mention of a Moldavian naval fleet is found in connection with the rule of Aron Tiranul, who used it to help Wallachian ruler Michael the Brave establish his control over the Chilia branch of the Danube and Dobruja.

The Treaty of Adrianople provided for a Moldavian self-defense naval force, to be composed of caicque vessels. Schooners armed with cannons were first built in the 1840s. Along with patrolling the Danube, these made their way on its tributaries, the Siret and the Prut River.

== Geography ==
Geographically, Moldavia is limited by the Carpathian Mountains to the West, the Cheremosh River to the North, the Dniester River to the East and the Danube and Black Sea to the South. The Prut River flows approximately through its middle from north to south.

Of late 15th century Moldavia, with an area of 94,862 km^{2} (36,626 sq mi), the biggest part and the core of the former principality is located in Romania (45.6%), followed by the Republic of Moldova (31.7%), and Ukraine (22.7%). This represents 88.2% of the Republic of Moldova's surface, 18% of Romania's surface, and 3.5% of Ukraine's surface.

The region is mostly hilly, with a range of mountains in the west, and plain areas in the southeast. Moldavia's highest altitude is Ineu peak (2,279 m), which is also the westernmost point of the region.

The parts of Moldavia populated by Csángó Hungarians are sometimes referred to as Csángó Land.

== Population ==
=== Historical population ===
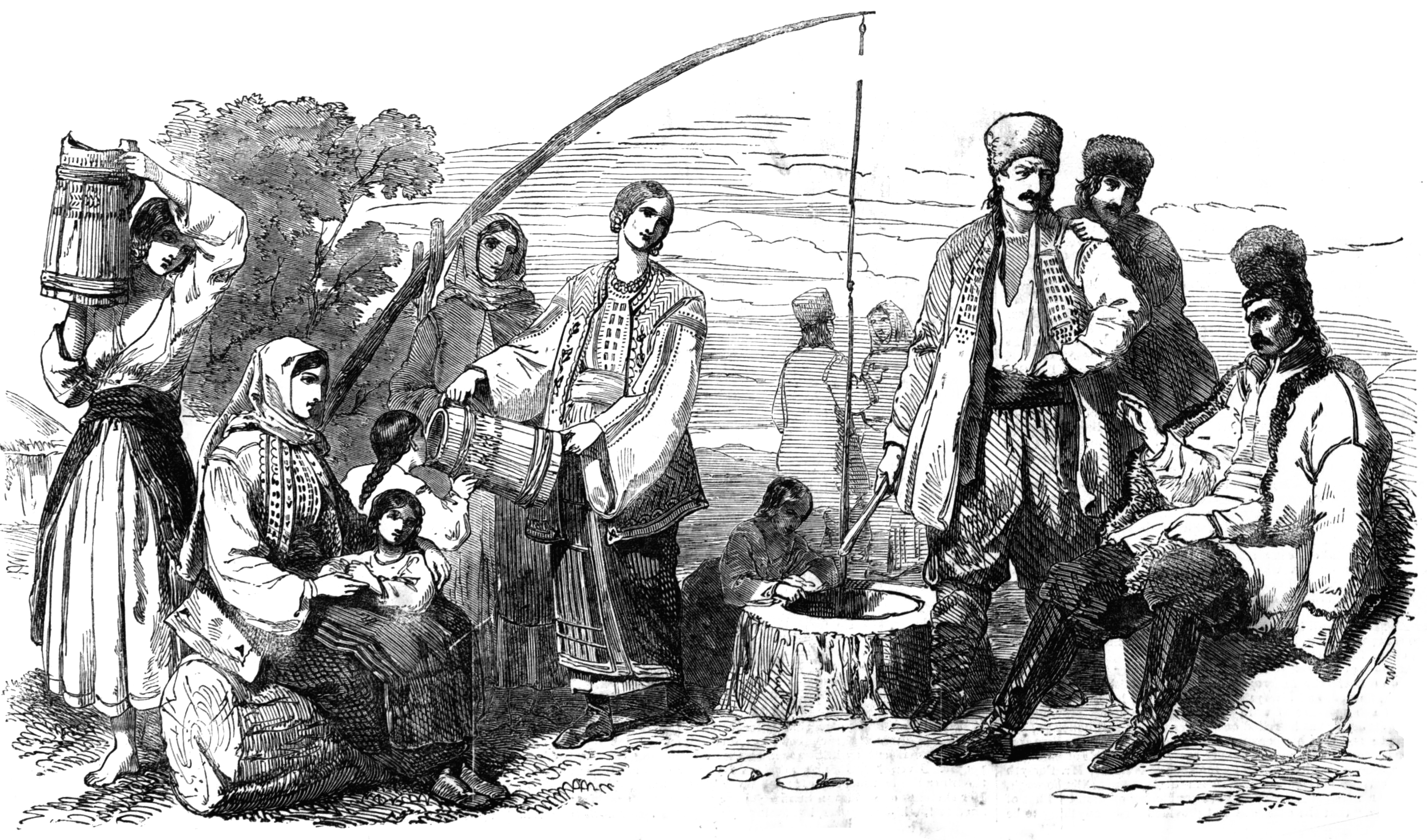
Moldo-Wallachian peasantry, 1853

Contemporary historians estimate the population (historically referred to as Moldavians) of the Moldavian Principality in the 15th century, at between 250,000 and 600,000 people, but an extensive census was first conducted in 1769–1774.

In 1848, the northwestern part, annexed in 1775 by the Habsburg Empire, Bukovina, had a population of 377,571; in 1856, the eastern half of Moldavia, Bessarabia, annexed in 1812 by the Russian Empire, had a population of 990,274, while the population of Moldavia proper (the western half), in 1859, was 1,463,927.

The contemporary population peaked in 1992, at 10.07 million inhabitants in all three historical divisions (Western Moldavia, Bessarabia and Bukovina). As of 2011, the population was 8.63 million people, of which 3.67 million were in Western Moldavia, 3.86 million in Bessarabia and 1.08 million in Bukovina.

=== Cities ===
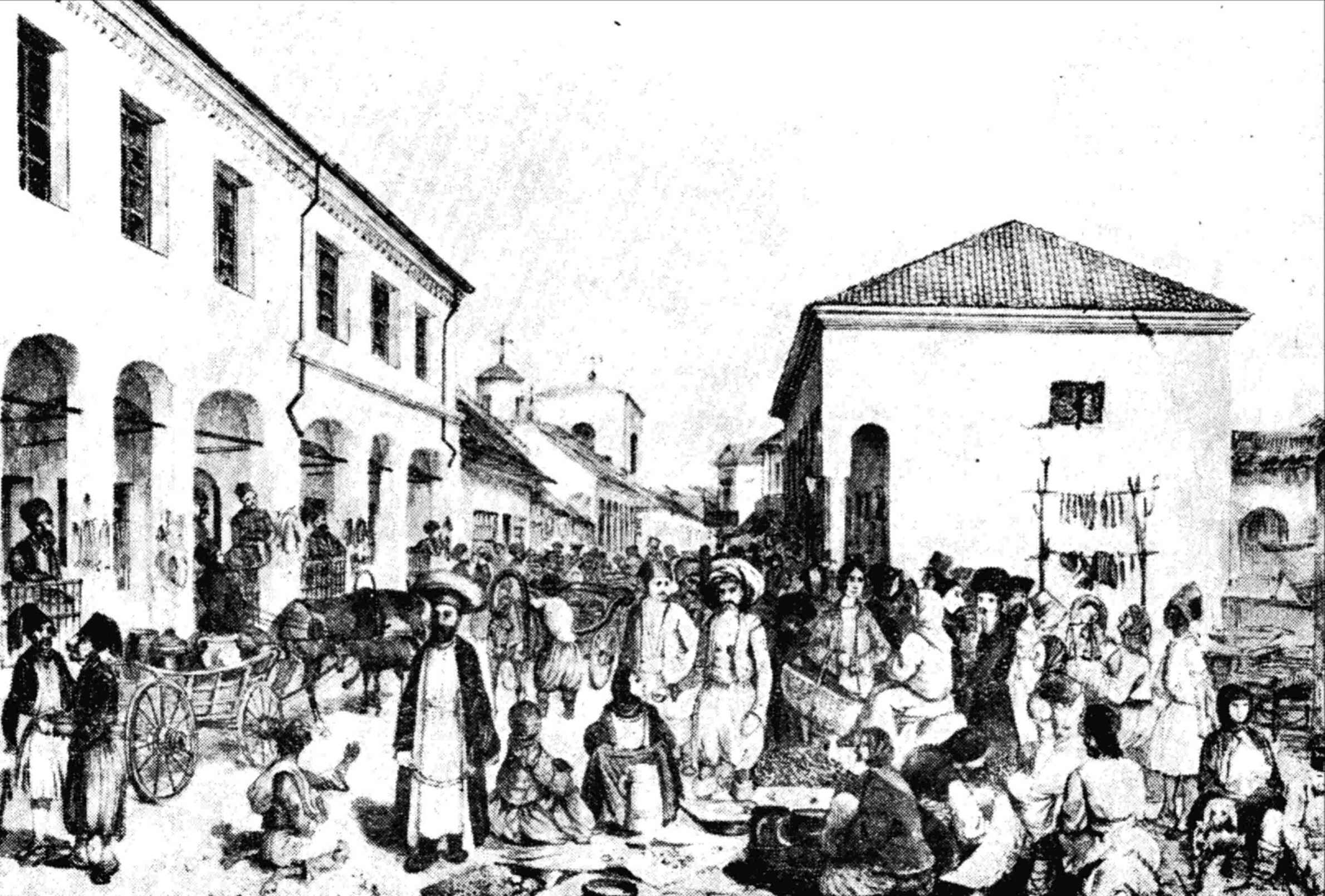
Lithograph of a cosmopolitan fair in Iași c. 1845; two Orthodox Jews are visible to the right

The largest cities (as per last censuses) and metropolitan areas in the Moldavia region are:

- Romania:
  - Iași – 290,422 (465,477 in metropolitan area) - capital of Moldavia between 1564 and 1859
  - Galați – 249,432 (323,563)
  - Bacău – 144,307 (223,239)
  - Botoșani – 106,847 (144,617)
  - Suceava – 92,121 (144,100) – capital of Moldavia between 1388 and 1564
  - Piatra Neamț – 85,055 (131,334)
  - Focșani – 79,315 (125,699)
- Ukraine:
  - Chernivtsi (Cernăuți) – 264,298
  - Izmail (Ismail) – 84,815
- Moldova:
  - Chișinău – 532,513 (662,836 in metropolitan area)
  - Bălți – 97,930 (102,457)
  - Tighina (Bender) – 91,882

== Education ==
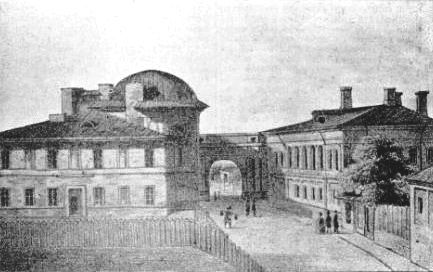
Academia Mihăileană was the first modern institution of higher learning in Moldavia.

In 1562, the so-called Schola Latina (a Latin Academic College) was founded in Cotnari, near Iași, a school which marked the beginnings of the organized humanistic education institutions in Moldavia.

The first institute of higher learning that functioned on the territory of Romania was Academia Vasiliană (1640), founded by Prince Vasile Lupu as a Higher School for Latin and Slavonic Languages, followed by the Princely Academy, in 1707. The first high education structure in Romanian was established in the autumn of 1813, when Gheorghe Asachi laid the foundations of a class of engineers, its activities taking place within the Greek Princely Academy.

After 1813, other moments marked the development of higher education in Romanian, regarding both humanities and the technical science. Academia Mihăileană, founded in 1835 by Prince Mihail Sturdza, is considered the first Romanian superior institute. In 1860, three faculties part of the Academia Mihăileană formed the nucleus for the newly established University of Iași, the first Romanian modern university.

== Culture ==
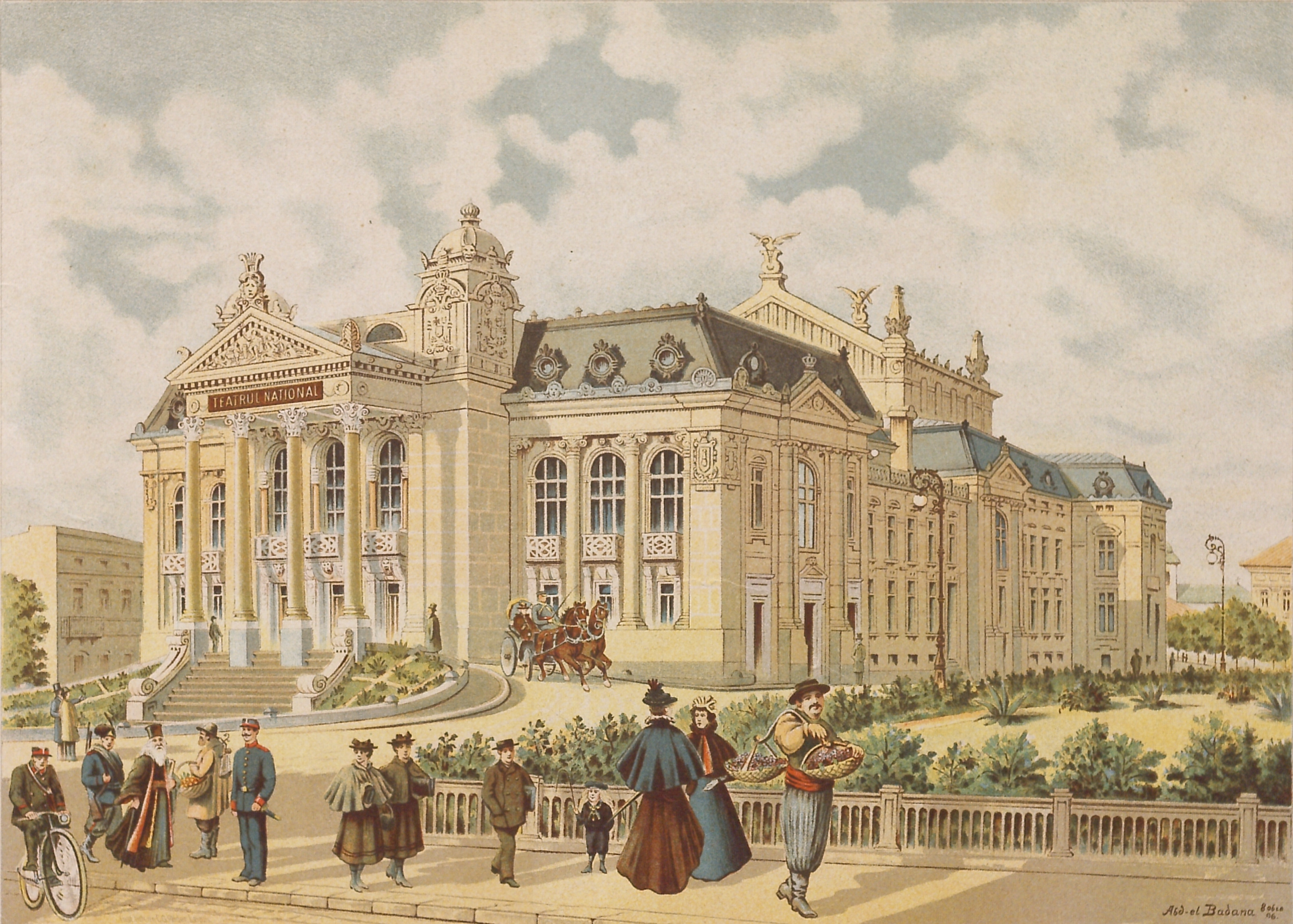
The Great Theatre of Moldavia, Iași, 1896

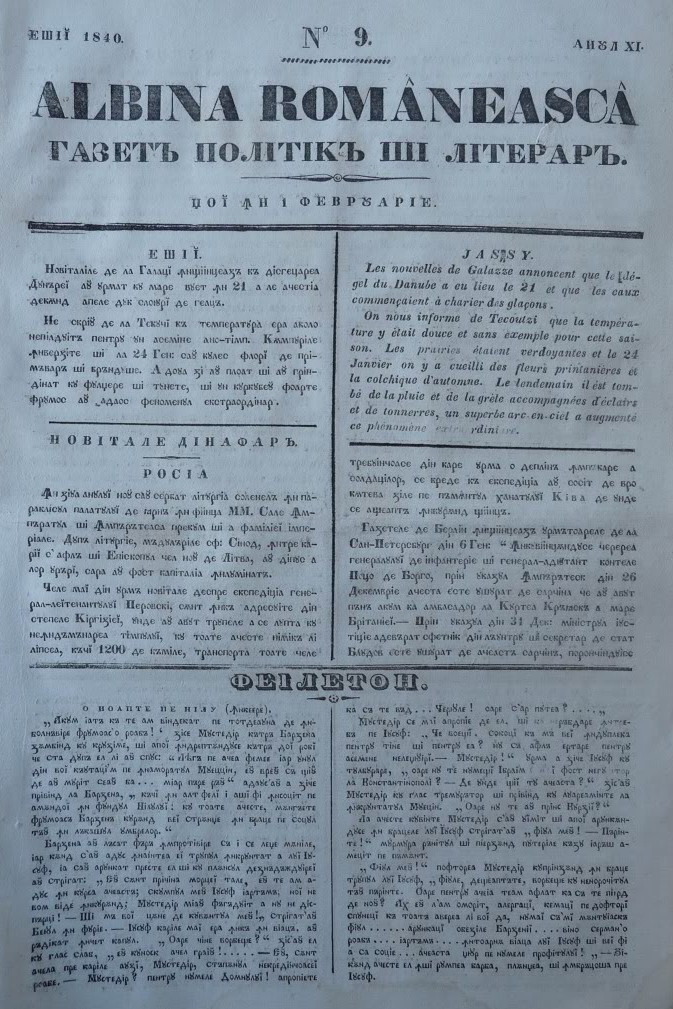
Albina Românească (The Romanian Bee) was, in 1829, the first Romanian-language journal published in Moldavia.

=== Literature ===
==== Old literature: chroniclers, religion, geography ====
- Cazania lui Varlaam (the Homiliary of Varlaam, 1643)
- Chronicle of Huru (19th-century fake)
- Grigore Ureche (1590–1647), chronicler
- Miron Costin (1633-1691), chronicler
- Nicolae Costin (1660–1712), chronicler
- Ion Neculce (1672–1745), chronicler
- Dimitrie Cantemir (1673–1723), ruling prince, man of letters and polymath
  - Descriptio Moldaviae
- Gheorghe Asachi (1788-1869), writer and polymath

=== Magazines and newspapers ===
- Alăuta Românească
- Albina Românească
- Dacia Literară
- Propășirea
- România Literară
- Steaua Dunării
- Zimbrul și Vulturul

=== Theatre ===
- The Great Theatre/National Theatre

=== Architecture with World Heritage Sites ===
- Moldavian style
- World Heritage Sites:
  - "Churches of Moldavia" World Heritage Site (8 churches)
  - Residence of Bukovinian and Dalmatian Metropolitans
  - Tentative list:
    - Neamț Monastery
    - Trei Ierarhi Monastery

=== Other World Heritage Sites ===
- World Heritage Site:
  - Rudi Geodetic Point (as part of the Struve Geodetic Arc)
  - Tentative list:
    - The Cultural Landscape Orheiul Vechi (Old Orhei)
    - The Typical Cernozem Soils of the Bălți Steppe
    - Slătioara Secular Forest

== See also ==
- History of the Republic of Moldova
- History of Romania
- Romanian Old Kingdom
- Kingdom of Romania
- Historical regions of Romania
- List of rulers of Moldavia
- Military history of Romania
- Balkan–Danubian culture
- Bulgarian lands across the Danube

== Sources ==
- Gheorghe I. Brătianu, Sfatul domnesc și Adunarea Stărilor în Principatele Române, Bucharest, 1995
- Vlad Georgescu, Istoria ideilor politice românești (1369-1878), Munich, 1987
- Ruysbroeck, Willem van (2009) [1990]. The Mission of Friar William of Rubruck: His Journey to the Court of the Great Khan Möngke, 1253-1255. Translated by Peter Jackson. Indianapolis/Cambridge: Hackett.
- Sălăgean, Tudor (2005). "Romanian Society in the Early Middle Ages (9th–14th Centuries AD)". In Pop, Ioan-Aurel; Bolovan, Ioan (eds.). History of Romania: Compendium. Romanian Cultural Institute (Center for Transylvanian Studies). pp. 133–207. ISBN 978-973-7784-12-4.
- Spinei, Victor (1986). Moldavia in the 11th–14th Centuries. Editura Academiei Republicii Socialiste Româna.
- Ștefan Ștefănescu, Istoria medie a României, Bucharest, 1991
- Vásáry, István (2005). Cumans and Tatars: Oriental Military in the Pre-Ottoman Balkans, 1185–1365. Cambridge University Press. ISBN 0-521-83756-1.
