= Vasilian College =

The Vasilian College or Vasilian Academy (Romanian: Academia Vasiliană) was an institution of higher learning in Iași, the Principality of Moldavia, founded by Prince Vasile Lupu in 1640.

Established in the capital of Moldavia as a "higher school for Latin and Slavonic languages", it functioned on the model of the Mohyla Academy in Kyiv, from where some of the professors came. It was disestablished some time after the end of Lupu's reign (1653).

The Academia Vasiliană was the first institute of higher education that functioned on the territory of Romania and it was symbolically continued by the Princely Academy of Iași (1707-1821), the Academia Mihăileană (1835-1847) and the Alexandru Ioan Cuza University (1860–present).

== See also ==
- The Princely Academy
- Academia Mihăileană
- Alexandru Ioan Cuza University
