= List of wars involving Moldova =

Wars involving Moldova

This is a list of conflicts involving the Principality of Moldavia and modern Moldova.

Victory
Defeat
Another result

*e.g. result unknown or indecisive/inconclusive, result of internal conflict inside Moldova, status quo ante bellum, or a treaty or peace without a clear result.

== Early period of Moldavia (1346–1538) ==
Below is a list of significant military conflicts involving Moldavia during the medieval period.

List of Medieval Wars involving Moldavia
Date	Conflict/Notable Battle	Moldavia and allies	Enemies	Result
1352–1353/1354	Campaign against Tatars	Moldavia; Hungary	Golden Horde	Victory: Tatars subjugated in Moldavia or expelled from Moldavian lands
1359	Revolt against Hungary	Moldavia	Kingdom of Hungary	Victory: Moldavia establishes itself as an independent principality
Autumn 1362/1363	Battle of Blue Waters	Lithuania; Moldavia	Golden Horde	Victory: Defeat of the Golden Horde forces
July 1368	Battle of Codrii Plonini	Moldavia	Poland	Victory: Destruction of the invading Polish army by Moldavians
1387	Polish vassalization of Moldavia (1387)	Moldavia	Poland Hungary	Defeat: Moldavia becomes a Polish vassal
12 February 1395	Battle of Ghindăoani	Moldavia	Hungary	Disputed
12 August 1399	Battle of the Vorskla River	Lithuanian-led coalition: Moldavia	Golden Horde	Defeat: Lithuanian-led coalition was crushed
27 September 1422	Battle of Marienburg (1422)	Moldavia	Teutonic Order	Victory: Moldavians crushed the Teutonic Knights
1431	Alexander the Good's expedition to Podolia	Moldavia	Poland	Defeat
January – September 1450	Moldavian–Polish War (1450)	Moldavia	Kingdom of Poland	Victory: Moldavia crushes the Polish army at Crasna river
24 January 1465	Siege of Chilia (1465)	Moldavia	Wallachia; Hungary	Victory: Moldavia annexes Chilia
November – December 1467	Hungarian–Moldavian War: Battle of Baia	Moldavia	Kingdom of Hungary	Victory: Kingdom of Hungary abandons its attempts to subjugate Moldavia
20 August 1470	Battle of Lipnic	Moldavia	Golden Horde	Victory: Moldavians crushed the Tatar invasion and captured Ahmed Khan's son
18–20 November 1473	Battle of the Vodna River	Moldavia	Wallachia	Victory: Moldavia defeats Wallachia and occupies Bucharest
1475–1476	Moldavian–Ottoman War (1475–1476): Battle of Vaslui	Moldavia	Ottoman Empire; Crimean Khanate; Nogai Tatars; Wallachia	Victory: Mehmed II retreats from Moldavia after his defeat at the Siege of Neamț Citadel
8 July 1481	Battle of Râmnic	Moldavia	Wallachia; Ottoman Empire	Victory: Basarab IV overthrown in favour of Vlad Călugărul
1484–1486	Moldavian Campaign (1484–1486)	Moldavia; Kingdom of Poland	Ottoman Empire; Crimean Khanate	Defeat: Moldavia comes under Ottoman influence after its loss of Chilia and Cetatea Albă
Summer 1490	Stephen the Great's expedition to Pokuttia	Moldavia	Kingdom of Poland	Victory: Moldavia occupies Pokuttia
1497–1499	Moldavian campaign (1497–1499): Battle of the Cosmin Forest	Moldavia; Ottoman Empire; Crimean Khanate; Wallachia; Hungary	Kingdom of Poland; Duchy of Masovia; Teutonic Order	Victory: Polish forces suffer crushing defeats at the Cosmin Forest, Lențești, Cernăuți and retreat from Moldavia
June – July 1498	Moldavian campaign in Poland	Moldavia	Kingdom of Poland	Victory: Moldavians devastated Poland and took 100,000 Polish slaves
1498–1500	Moldavian–Ottoman War (1498–1500): Battle of Botoșani	Moldavia	Ottoman Empire	Victory: Moldavia retains higher degree of independence
June 1502	Battle of the Samara River	Moldavia; Crimean Khanate	Golden Horde	Victory: Destruction of the Golden Horde
1502–1510	Moldavian–Polish War (1502–1510)	Moldavia; Ottoman Empire	Kingdom of Poland	Defeat: Kingdom of Poland annexes Pokuttia
1506–1514	Moldavian–Wallachian War	Moldavia	Wallachia; Transylvania	Victory: Wallachia suffers colossal economic damage
22 June 1529	Battle of Feldioara	Moldavia; Szeklers	Holy Roman Empire; Habsburg Austria: Ferdinand's Hungary; Szeklers (D)	Victory: Moldavians defeated the Habsburgs and Szeklers defected to Moldavian side
1530–1538	Moldavian–Polish War (1530–1538): Battle of Obertyn; Battle of Seret	Moldavia	Kingdom of Poland	Defeat: Kingdom of Poland retains control over Pokuttia
1538	Moldavian Campaign (1538)	Moldavia; Eastern Hungary	Ottoman Empire; Crimean Khanate	Defeat: Moldavia becomes dependent on the Ottoman Empire

== Ottoman Period (1538–1812) ==
Below is a list of significant military conflicts involving Moldavia during the Ottoman period.

List of Wars involving Moldavia during the Ottoman period
Date	Conflict/Notable Battle	Moldavia and allies	Enemies	Result
1538–1774	Moldavian and Cossack anti-Ottoman resistance: Cossack raids; Cossack campaigns in Moldavia	Moldavian opposition Zaporozhian Cossacks	Ottoman Empire; Crimean Khanate; Nogai Horde	Victory: Weakening of the Ottoman influence over Moldavia
1550	Siege of Bar (1550)	Moldavia	Kingdom of Poland	Defeat
1563	Moldavian campaign (1563)	Moldavia; Ottoman Empire	Zaporozhian Cossacks; Kingdom of Poland	Victory: Cossack-Polish invasion repelled and Dmytro Vyshnevetsky captured by the Ottomans
1574	Battle of the Cahul (1574)	Moldavia; Zaporozhian Cossacks	Ottoman Empire; Crimean Khanate	Defeat: Moldavia returns under Ottoman vassalage
1595	Jan Zamoyski's expedition to Moldavia	Moldavia; Ottoman Empire; Crimean Khanate	Polish–Lithuanian Commonwealth	Defeat: Moldavia comes under Polish-Lithuanian vassalage
1607	Stefan Potocki's expedition to Moldavia	Moldavia; Crimean Khanate	Polish–Lithuanian Commonwealth	Defeat: Mihail Movilă overthrown in favour of Constantin Movilă
1615–1616	Samuel Korecki's expedition to Moldavia	Moldavia; Ottoman Empire; Crimean Khanate; Wallachia	Polish–Lithuanian Commonwealth	Victory: Samuel Korecki was defeated and captured
1620	Battle of Cecora (1620)	Ottoman Empire; Crimean Khanate; Transylvania; Moldavia (switched)	Polish–Lithuanian Commonwealth; Moldavia	Pro-Ottoman victory: Moldavia breaks free from Polish-Lithuanian influence, but becomes Ottoman tributary
1650	Moldavian campaign (1650)	Moldavia	Cossack Hetmanate; Crimean Khanate	Defeat: Moldavia was put under the Cossack influence
1653	Moldavian campaign (1653)	Cossack Hetmanate; Moldavia	Moldavia; Transylvania; Wallachia; Polish–Lithuanian Commonwealth	Anti-Cossack victory: Death of Tymofiy Khmelnytsky
1657	Transylvanian campaign into Poland (1657)	Principality of Transylvania (yes) Swedish Empire; Cossack Hetmanate; Moldavia	Polish–Lithuanian Commonwealth	Inconclusive
1684–1691	Moldavian campaign (1684–1691)	(Ottoman Empire) Ottoman-led coalition: Moldavia	(Polish–Lithuanian Commonwealth) Polish–Lithuanian-led coalition: Moldavia	Pro-Ottoman victory: Polish–Lithuanian Commonwealth repulsed from Moldavia
1710–1713	Russo-Turkish War (1710–1713)	Russian-led coalition: Moldavia	(Ottoman Empire) Ottoman-led coalition	Defeat: Moldavia remains under Ottoman suzerainty
1806–1812	Russo-Turkish War (1806–1812)	Russian-led coalition: Moldavia	Ottoman Empire	Victory: Eastern Moldavia breaks free from Ottoman suzerainty, but gets incorporated into the Russian Empire as Bessarabia Governorate

== Modern wars of Moldova (1918–present) ==
Below is a list of significant military conflicts involving Moldova during the modern period.

List of Modern Wars involving Moldova
Date	Conflict/Notable Battle	Moldova and allies	Enemies	Result
19 January – 8 March 1918	Romanian military intervention in Bessarabia	Romanian-led coalition: Anti-Bolshevik Moldavia	Bolshevik-led coalition: Pro-Bolshevik Moldavia	Anti-Bolshevik victory: Kingdom of Romania occupied central and southern Bessarabia
15–18 September 1924	Tatarbunary Uprising	Kingdom of Romania	Tatarbunary Revolutionary Committee	Defeat: Uprising suppressed
28 June – 3 July 1940	Soviet occupation of Bessarabia and Northern Bukovina	Kingdom of Romania	Soviet Union: Moldavian ASSR	Victory: Formation of Moldavian SSR
July 1941 – August 1944	Moldovan resistance during World War II	Kingdom of Romania; Germany	Moldavian partisans Supported by: Soviet Union	Victory: Expulsion of Axis occupation forces
2 November 1990 – 21 July 1992	Transnistrian War	(Moldova) Moldova; Supported by: Romania	Transnistria (Russia) Russia; Supported by: Ukraine	Defeat: Transnistria separates from Moldova
2003–2008	Iraq War	Multi-National Force – Iraq: Moldova	Iraqi insurgents	Victory: Participation enhances Moldova's international relations

== See also ==
- Moldavian–Horde Wars
- Moldavian–Ottoman Wars
- Military career of Stephen the Great
- List of armed conflicts between Poland and Moldavia

== Bibliography ==
- Giurescu, Constantin C. (1974). Chronological History of Romania. Editura enciclopedică română.
- Zhukovsky, Arkadii (1993). Moldavia. Internet Encyclopedia of Ukraine.
