= Military career of Stephen the Great =

Military career of legendary Moldavian Voivode

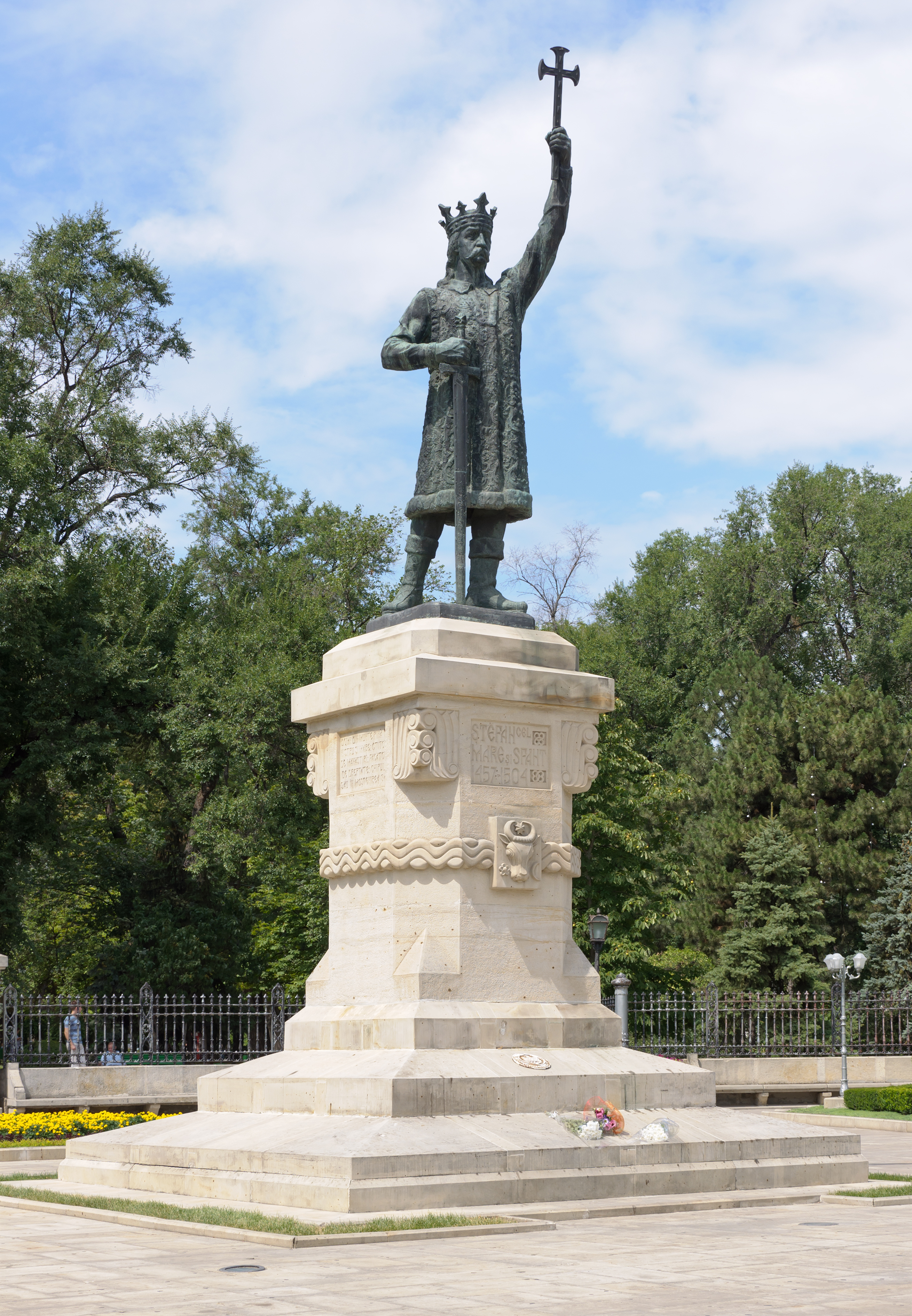
Stephen the Great Monument in Chișinău, Moldova

The military career of Stephen the Great spanned for nearly 50 years. Stephen the Great commanded the Moldavian military forces for the first time as a co-commander, alongside his father Bogdan II in 1450, then as a Voivode of Moldavia from 1457 until his death in 1504.

Stephen's most famous victory took place at the Battle of Vaslui on 10 January 1475, against the Ottoman army of Hadım Suleiman Pasha, earning him the title Athleta Christi ("Champion of Christ") from Pope Sixtus IV. Ottoman defeat at Vaslui was described by contemporaries as "the greatest suffered by an Ottoman army in its history". Stephen's victory boosted the morale of numerous leaders of the Christian European states, as it shattered the Ottoman Empire's reputation of invincibility.

Stephen's leaderships allowed him to muster up to 55,000 troops, mainly consisting of peasants. Stephen is traditionally believed to have taken part in 36 battles, out of which 34 were victories. Other sources estimate Stephen's record at 44–46 victories in battles. He's considered a national hero in both Romania and Moldova, earning him canonisation by the Romanian Orthodox Church.

An anonymous chronicler gave the following impression of Stephen as a military leader and his resilient character:

Master of the craft of war, he went wherever he was needed so that seeing him his men would not disperse and for that reason there was seldom a war that he did not win. And when others defeated him, he did not lose hope, for, when vanquished, he would rise above his vanquishers.

== Military record ==
Opponent flags

Ottoman Empire	Crimean Khanate	Nogai Tatars	Golden Horde	Kingdom of Hungary	Kingdom of Poland	Duchy of Masovia	Teutonic Order	Wallachia	Moldavian opposition

Results

Favorable result Uncertain result Unfavorable result

Summary (Incomplete)Overviews of clashes
No.	Clash(es)	Date(s)	Location(s)	Conflict(s)	Type(s)	Opponent(s)	Result
1.	Battle of the Crasna River	5–6 September 1450	Crasna river, Moldavia	Moldavian–Polish War (1450)	Open battle		Victory
2.	Battle of Doljești	12 April 1457	Doljești, Moldavia		Open battle	Moldavia	Victory
3.	Battle of Orbic	c. April 1457	Orbic, Moldavia		Open battle	Moldavia	Victory
4.	Siege of Chilia (1462)	22 June 1462	Chilia, Wallachia		Siege	Wallachia Matthias I of Hungary	Defeat
5.	Siege of Chilia (1465)	24 January 1465	Chilia, Wallachia		Siege	Wallachia Matthias I of Hungary	Victory
6.	Battle of Baia	15 December 1467	Baia, Moldavia	Hungarian–Moldavian War	Open battle	Matthias I of Hungary	Disputed
7.	Battle of Lipnic	20 August 1470	Lipnic, Moldavia	Moldavian–Horde Wars	Open battle		Victory
8.	Battle of Sochi	7 March 1471	Sochi, near Râmnicu Sărat, Wallachia	Moldavian–Ottoman Wars	Open battle	(Ottoman Empire)	Victory
9.	Battle of the Vodna River	18–20 November 1473	Vodna river, 45km from Bucharest, Wallachia		Open battle	Wallachia	Victory
10.	Siege of Dâmbovița Fortress	23 November 1473	Bucharest, Wallachia	Moldavian–Ottoman Wars	Siege	(Ottoman Empire)	Victory
11.	Battle of Bucharest	28 November 1473	Forest near Bucharest, Wallachia	Moldavian–Ottoman Wars	Open battle	(Ottoman Empire)	Victory
12.	Battle of Vaslui	10 January 1475	Vaslui, Moldavia	Moldavian–Ottoman War (1475–1476)	Open battle	(Ottoman Empire)	Victory
13.	Battle of Ştefăneşti	July 1476	Ștefănești, Moldavia	Moldavian–Ottoman War (1475–1476)	Open battle	no	Victory
14.	Battle of Valea Albă	26 July 1476	Războieni, Moldavia	Moldavian–Ottoman War (1475–1476)	Open battle	(Ottoman Empire)	Defeat
15.	Siege of Neamț Citadel	c. August 1476	Neamț Citadel, Moldavia	Moldavian–Ottoman War (1475–1476)	Defensive siege	(Ottoman Empire)	Victory
16.	Battle of Râmnic	8 July 1481	Râmnicu Sărat, Wallachia	Moldavian–Ottoman Wars	Open battle	(Ottoman Empire)	Victory
17.	Battle of Cătlăbuga	16 November 1485	Cătlăbuga, near Chilia, Moldavia	Moldavian Campaign (1484–1486)	Open battle	(Ottoman Empire)	Victory
18.	Battle of Șcheia	6 March 1486	Șcheia, Moldavia	Moldavian Campaign (1484–1486)	Open battle	(Ottoman Empire)	Victory
19.	Stephen the Great's expedition to Pokuttia	Summer 1490	Pokuttia, Kingdom of Poland	Moldavian–Polish Wars	Expedition		Victory
20.	Battle of the Cosmin Forest	26 October 1497	Cosmin Forest, Moldavia	Moldavian campaign (1497–1499)	Open battle	State of the Teutonic Order	Victory
21.	Battle of Lențești	29 October 1497	Lențești, Moldavia	Moldavian campaign (1497–1499)	Open battle		Victory
22.	Battle of Cernăuți	30 October 1497	Cernăuți, Moldavia	Moldavian campaign (1497–1499)	Open battle	State of the Teutonic Order	Victory
23.	Moldavian campaign in Poland	June – July 1498	South-eastern Kingdom of Poland	Moldavian campaign (1497–1499)	Campaign		Victory
24.	Battle of Botoșani (1498)	November 1498	Botoșani, Moldavia	Moldavian–Ottoman Wars	Open battle	(Ottoman Empire)	Victory
25.	Battle of the Prut River	5 January 1499	Prut river, Moldavia	Moldavian–Ottoman Wars	Open battle	(Ottoman Empire)	Victory
26.	Battle of Botoșani (1500)	14 March 1500	Botoșani, Moldavia	Moldavian–Polish Wars	Open battle		Victory
27.	Raid on Chilia and Cetatea Albă	1500	Chilia and Cetatea Albă, Ottoman Empire	Moldavian–Ottoman Wars	Raid	(Ottoman Empire)	Victory
28.	Battle of the Samara River	June 1502	Samara river, Wild Fields	Moldavian–Horde Wars	Open battle		Victory
