= Moldavian–Polish War =

Moldavian–Polish War may refer:

- List of armed conflicts between Poland and Moldavia
- Battle of Codrii Plonini (1368)
- Polish vassalization of Moldavia (1387)
- Alexander the Good's expedition to Podolia (1431)
- Odrowąż Intervention in Moldavia (1435)
- Moldavian–Polish War (1450)
- Moldavian campaign (1497–1499)
  - Moldavian campaign in Poland (1498)
- Moldavian–Polish War (1502–1510)
- Moldavian–Polish War (1530–1538)
- Siege of Bar (1550)
- Sieniawski Intervention in Moldavia (1552)
- Moldavian campaign of Dmytro Vyshnevetsky (1563)
- Jan Zamoyski's expedition to Moldavia (1595)
- Stefan Potocki's expedition to Moldavia (1607)
- Samuel Korecki's expedition to Moldavia (1615–1616)
- Moldavian campaign (1684–1691)
