= List of armed conflicts between Poland and Moldavia =

Wars between Poland and Moldavia

This is a List of armed conflicts between Poland and Moldavia. The list includes a series of wars and notable military engagements between the Polish states (Kingdom of Poland or Polish–Lithuanian Commonwealth) and Principality of Moldavia during 1368–1691.

Polish or Polish–Lithuanian victory
Moldavian victory
Another result

== Conflicts between the Kingdom of Poland and Moldavia (1368–1563) ==
List of significant military conflicts between Kingdom of Poland and Moldavia, from 1368 to 1563:

| Date | Conflict | Poland and allies | Moldavia and allies | Result |
|---|---|---|---|---|
| 1368 | Battle of Codrii Plonini | Kingdom of Poland | Moldavia | Moldavian victory |
| 1387 | Polish vassalization of Moldavia (1387) | Kingdom of Poland Kingdom of Hungary | Moldavia | Polish victory |
| 1431 | Alexander the Good's expedition to Podolia | Kingdom of Poland | Moldavia | Polish victory |
| 1450 | Moldavian–Polish War (1450) | Kingdom of Poland | Moldavia | Moldavian victory |
| 1490 | Stephen's expedition to Pokuttia | Kingdom of Poland | Moldavia | Moldavian victory |
| 1497 | Moldavian campaign (1497) | Kingdom of Poland; Duchy of Masovia; Teutonic Order | Moldavia; Ottoman Empire; Crimean Khanate; Wallachia; Kingdom of Hungary | Moldavian coalition victory |
| 1498 | Moldavian campaign in Poland | Kingdom of Poland | Moldavia; Ottoman Empire; Crimean Khanate | Moldavian victory |
| 1500 | Battle of Botoșani | Kingdom of Poland | Moldavia | Moldavian victory |
| 1502–1510 | Moldavian–Polish War (1502–1510) | Kingdom of Poland | Moldavia; Ottoman Empire | Polish victory |
| 1530–1538 | Moldavian–Polish War (1530–1538) | Kingdom of Poland | Moldavia | Polish victory |
| 1550 | Siege of Bar (1550) | Kingdom of Poland | Moldavia; Wallachia | Polish victory |
| 1551 | Sieniawski's intervention in Moldavia | Kingdom of Poland | Moldavia | Moldavian victory |
| 1552 | Sieniawski's intervention in Moldavia | Kingdom of Poland | Moldavia | Polish victory |
| 1561 | Battle of Verbia | Kingdom of Poland; Holy Roman Empire (Sovereign Military Order of Malta) Knights Hospitaller; Zaporizhian Cossacks | Moldavia; Ottoman Empire | Polish coalition victory |
| 1563 | Moldavian campaign (1563) | Zaporozhian Cossacks; Kingdom of Poland | Moldavia; Ottoman Empire | Moldavian–Ottoman victory |

== Conflicts between the Polish–Lithuanian Commonwealth and Moldavia (1572–1691) ==
List of significant military conflicts between Polish–Lithuanian Commonwealth and Moldavia, from 1572 to 1691:

| Date | Conflict | Poland and allies | Moldavia and allies | Result |
|---|---|---|---|---|
| 1572 | Mikołaj Mielecki's expedition to Moldova | Polish–Lithuanian Commonwealth | Moldavia; Ottoman Empire | Moldavian victory |
| 1572 | Siege of Khotyn | Polish–Lithuanian Commonwealth | Moldavia; Ottoman Empire | Polish–Lithuanian victory |
| 1595 | Jan Zamoyski's expedition to Moldavia | Polish–Lithuanian Commonwealth | Moldavia; Ottoman Empire; Crimean Khanate | Polish–Lithuanian victory |
| 1607 | Stefan Potocki's expedition to Moldavia | Polish–Lithuanian Commonwealth | Moldavia; Crimean Khanate | Polish–Lithuanian victory |
| 1612 | Battle of Cornul lui Sas | Polish–Lithuanian Commonwealth | Moldavia; Ottoman Empire; Crimean Khanate | Moldavian coalition victory |
| 1615–1616 | Samuel Korecki's expedition to Moldavia | Polish–Lithuanian Commonwealth | Moldavia; Ottoman Empire; Crimean Khanate; Wallachia | Moldavian coalition victory |
| 1653 | Moldavian campaign of Tymofiy Khmelnytsky | Polish–Lithuanian Commonwealth; Transylvania; Wallachia | Moldavia; Cossack Hetmanate; Crimean Khanate | Polish–Lithuanian coalition victory |
| 1684–1691 | Moldavian campaign (1684–1691) | Polish–Lithuanian Commonwealth; Brandenburg–Prussia; Cossack Hetmanate | Moldavia; Cossack Hetmanate; Crimean Khanate | Ottoman–Moldavian victory |

== See also ==
- List of armed conflicts involving Poland against Germany
- List of armed conflicts between Poland and Ukraine
- List of armed conflicts between Poland and Russia
- List of wars between Poland and Sweden
- Military career of Stephen the Great
- List of wars involving Moldova
- List of wars involving Poland

== Bibliography ==
- Zhukovsky, Arkadii (1993). Moldavia. Internet Encyclopedia of Ukraine.
- Iorga, Nicolae (1904). Istoria lui Ștefan cel Mare [The History of Stephen the Great] (in Romanian). Bucharest: MINER VA, INSTITUTE OF GRAPHIC ARTS AND PUBLISHING STR. REGALĂ NO. 6 (HOTEL UNION}.
- Giurescu, Constantin C. (1974). Chronological History of Romania. Editura enciclopedică română.
