= List of Polish–Ottoman wars =

Poland (Kingdom of Poland and Polish–Lithuanian Commonwealth) and the Ottoman Empire have been in many armed conflicts against one another. This includes Polish or Ottoman intervention in wars such as the Hungarian–Ottoman War (1437–1442) or the Battle of Verbia.

Note that this list doesn't only contain wars, but armed conflicts as a whole. Therefore, single battles or raids are allowed to be on here.

Polish or Polish–Lithuanian victory

Ottoman victory

Another result (Result unknown or indecisive, Status quo ante bellum, treaty or peace without a clear result)

== Kingdom of Poland against the Ottoman Empire (1375–1561) ==
| Year | Conflict | Polish side | Ottoman side | Result |
|---|---|---|---|---|
| 1375–1377 | Hungarian–Ottoman War Part of the Hungarian–Ottoman Wars Location: Balkans, Kingdom of Hungary | Kingdom of Hungary Kingdom of Poland | Ottoman Empire Bulgarian Empire Wallachia | Polish–Hungarian victory: Great financial losses to Hungarian treasury |
| 1415–1419 | Hungarian–Ottoman War Part of the Hungarian–Ottoman Wars Location: Doboj, Nikopol, Balkans, Kingdom of Hungary, Kingdom of Bosnia | Kingdom of Hungary Kingdom of Poland Grand Duchy of Lithuania | Ottoman Empire Wallachia Kingdom of Bosnia Serbian Despotate | Indecisive: Ottoman Empire consolidates position of Turkish control in the Kingdom of Bosnia; Kingdom of Hungary reconquers Banate of Severin |
| 1475 | Battle of Vaslui Part of the Moldavian–Ottoman Wars and Hungarian–Ottoman Wars Location: Near Vaslui | Moldavia Kingdom of Poland Kingdom of Hungary | Ottoman Empire | Moldavian–allied victory |
| 1485–1503 | Polish–Ottoman War Location: Wild Fields, Moldavia, Southern Kingdom of Poland and Grand Duchy of Lithuania Battles: Campaign–box: Polish–Ottoman War (1485–1503) | Kingdom of Poland Duchy of Masovia Teutonic Order Grand Duchy of Lithuania | Ottoman Empire Crimean Khanate Moldavia | Ottoman–led victory: Moldavia gains Pokuttia |
| 1502–1510 | Moldavian–Polish War Part of the Moldavian–Polish Wars Location: Pokuttia, Moldavia, Kingdom of Poland | Kingdom of Poland | Moldavia Ottoman Empire | Polish victory: Bogdan III the One-Eyed relinquishes his claim to Pokuttia and his marriage plans with Elizabeth Jagiellon |
| 1561 | Battle of Verbia Part of the Moldavian Magnate Wars Location: Verbia, Dorohoi County, Moldavia | Rebel forces Kingdom of Poland Grand Duchy of Lithuania Holy Roman Empire (Sovereign Military Order of Malta) Knights Hospitaller Zaporizhian Sich | Moldavia Ottoman Empire Wallachia | Rebel victory: Rebels gain control over most of Moldavia |

== Polish–Lithuanian Commonwealth against the Ottoman Empire (1593–1699) ==
| Year | Conflict | Polish side | Ottoman side | Result |
|---|---|---|---|---|
| 1593–1606 | Long Turkish War Part of the Ottoman–Habsburg Wars Location: Hungary, Wallachia, Balkans Battles: Campaign–box: Long Turkish War | Habsburg Monarchy Kingdom of Hungary Kingdom of Croatia Grand Duchy of Tuscany Knights of St. Stephen Principality of Transylvania Wallachia Moldavia France Spain Duchy of Ferrara Zaporozhian Cossacks Serbian hajduks Papal States Polish–Lithuanian Commonwealth | Ottoman Empire Crimean Khanate | Inconclusive: Peace of Zsitvatorok (1606) |
| 1595 | Jan Zamoyski's expedition to Moldavia Part of the Moldavian Magnate Wars Location: Iași, Țuțora, Moldavia Battles: Battle of Cecora; Battle of Suceava | Polish–Lithuanian Commonwealth | Ottoman Empire Moldavia Crimean Khanate | Polish–Lithuanian victory: Moldavia becomes Polish vassal |
| 1607 | Stefan Potocki's expedition to Moldavia | Polish–Lithuanian Commonwealth | Moldavia Crimean Khanate | Polish victory: Mihail Movilă overthrown in favour of Constantin Movilă |
| 1612 | Battle of Cornul lui Sas Part of the Moldavian Magnate Wars Location: Popricani, Iași County | Polish–Lithuanian Commonwealth; Moldavian opposition | Ottoman Empire Moldavia Crimean Khanate | Moldavian–allied victory |
| 1615–1616 | Samuel Korecki's expedition to Moldavia Part of the Moldavian–Polish Wars Location: Iași, Țuțora, Moldavia | Polish–Lithuanian Commonwealth Moldavian opposition | Ottoman Empire Moldavia Crimean Khanate Wallachia | Moldavian–Ottoman–Tatar victory: Samuel Korecki imprisoned |
| 1620–1621 | Polish–Ottoman War Location: Moldavia and Bukovina Battles: Battle of Cecora; Battle of Khotyn | Polish–Lithuanian Commonwealth Registered Cossacks Moldavia | Ottoman Empire Crimean Khanate Transylvania | Inconclusive: Treaty of Khotyn (1621) |
| 1633–1634 | Polish–Ottoman War Location: Polish–Lithuanian Commonwealth | Polish–Lithuanian Commonwealth | Ottoman Empire Moldavia Budjak Horde | Indecisive (Note: Polish–Lithuanian military victory): Status quo ante bellum |
| 1666–1671 | Polish–Cossack–Tatar War Part of the Russo-Polish War (1654–1667) Location: Polish–Lithuanian Commonwealth, Cossack Hetmanate, Crimean Khanate Return of the Victorious by Józef Brandt, 19th century | Polish–Lithuanian Commonwealth | Cossack Hetmanate Crimean Khanate Ottoman Janissaries | Polish–Lithuanian victory: Start of the next Polish–Ottoman War |
| 1672–1676 | Polish–Ottoman War Location: Polish–Lithuanian Commonwealth Battles: Campaign–box: Polish–Ottoman War (1672–1676) | Polish–Lithuanian Commonwealth Wallachia (1673) Supporters of Khanenko | Ottoman Empire Crimean Khanate Supporters of Doroshenko | Disputed (Note: Polish–Lithuanian military victory): Treaty of Buchach: Ottoman Empire gains Podolia and parts of Central Ukraine; Treaty of Żurawno: Polish-Lithuanian Commonwealth regains Bila Tserkva and Pavoloch |
| 1683–1699 | Polish–Ottoman War Part of the Great Turkish War Location: Austria, Crimea, Hungary, Moldavia, Serbia, Ukraine Battles: Battle of Vienna; Battle of Párkány; Battle of Chițcani; Battle of Reni; Siege of Kamenets; Battle of Hodów; Battle of Ustechko; Battle of Podhajce | Polish–Lithuanian Commonwealth Zaporozhian Cossacks Holy Roman Empire Tsardom of Russia (1686–1699) | Ottoman Empire Crimean Khanate Principality of Upper Hungary (until 1865) Transylvania Hungarian Kuruc Resistance | Holy League victory: Treaty of Karlowitz; Ottoman Empire returns Podolia and the south of Right-bank Ukraine to the Polish–Lithuanian Commonwealth; Polish–Lithuanian Commonwealth returns Khotyn, Câmpulung, Soroca, Suceava and Neamț (all taken during the war) to Moldavia |

== Bibliography ==
- Tuchman, Barbara (1978), A Distant Mirror: The Calamitous 14th Century, pp. 549–566
- Horea Teculescu, "Sicriul lui Despot-Vodă", in Țara Noastră, Vol. XI, Issue 1, January 1931, pp. 12–18.
- A. D. Xenopol, Istoria românilor din Dacia Traiană. Vol. V: Epoca lui Mihai Viteazul. Bucharest: Cartea Românească, 1927.
- Tucker, Spencer Coakley (2010), A Global Chronology of Conflict, vol. 2, Santa Barbara
