= Pyatigorsk War =

Circassian against Golden Horde 1492

Circassian-Golden Horde War
- Part of the Mongol invasions
| Date | 1492 |
| Location | Circassia, North Caucasus; Pyatigorsk region |
| Result | Circassian victory |
| Territorial changes | Retreat of the Great Horde from Circassian and North Caucasian lands |

Belligerents
| Great Horde | Circassia Supported by: Principality of Moscow | Crimean Khanate |

Commanders and leaders
| Sheikh Ahmed; Seid-Mahmud | Unnamed Circassian princes | Mamyshek (Crimean prince) |

Strength
| ~5,000–10,000 | ~3,000–6,000 | ~500–1,000 |

Casualties and losses
| Heavy; Loss of livestock, supplies, and strategic position | Light to moderate Some losses during border raids and capture of envoys | Heavy |

The Pyatigorsk War was a brief military and diplomatic episode involving the Great Horde and the Circassians, which took place in the North Caucasus region during the internal decline of the Horde.

== History ==
In 1492, the Great Horde temporarily settled in the Kuma River valley, on the northern edge of the North Caucasus. While in the region, it reportedly engaged in agricultural activity and launched a military campaign against the Circassians. Later that year, due to crop failure and worsening conditions, the Horde moved closer to the Kabarda frontier, into the Pyatigorye area. However, several major Tatar tribal groups chose instead to migrate toward the Volga River, prompting the Horde’s leadership to follow.

Reports from contemporary sources, including Muscovite envoys in Crimea, described the Great Horde as suffering from famine and the loss of livestock, indicating a significant internal crisis.

That same year, a Crimean military unit attacked a Circassian diplomatic mission traveling to the leadership of the Great Horde. According to correspondence from Khan Meñli I Giray to Ivan III of Russia, the Crimean detachment seized gifts and detained the envoys. Soon after, Muscovite service Cossacks intervened and took control of the prisoners and their belongings. The Crimean Khan later requested that Moscow return both the captives and the confiscated goods.
