= Battle of Cătlăbuga =

1485 battle during the Moldavian–Ottoman Wars

- Part of the Moldavian–Ottoman Wars and Moldavian Campaign (1484–1486)
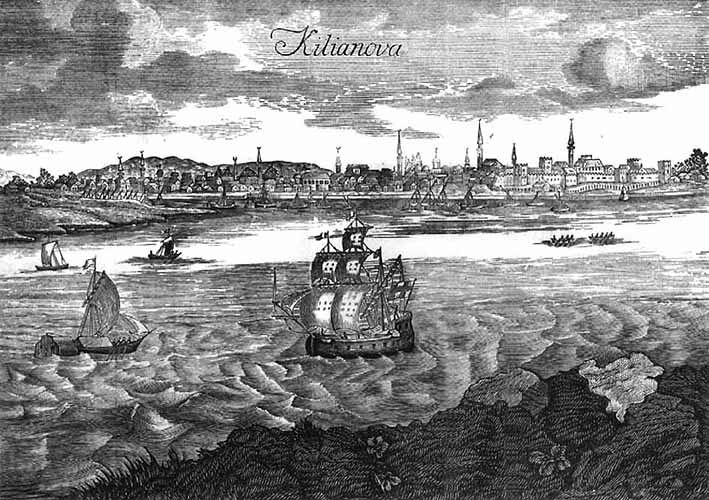
Date	November 16, 1485
Location	Near Chilia, present-day Ukraine
Result	Moldavian victory

Belligerents
Moldavia; Crown of the Kingdom of Poland	Ottoman Empire

Commanders and leaders
Stephen the Great; Jan Karnkowski	Malkoçoğlu Bali Bey; Skender Pasha

Strength
Unknown	Unknown

Casualties and losses
Unknown	Unknown

The Battle of Cătlăbuga was fought on November 16, 1485, between Stephen III of Moldavia and Ottoman forces defending the surroundings of Chilia. The Moldavian army came out victorious, but Stephen ceased attempting to regain Chilia.
