= Battle of Cecora (1595) =

Battle in Moldavian Magnate Wars

- Part of Jan Zamoyski's expedition to Moldavia; Moldavian Magnate Wars; Polish–Ottoman Wars
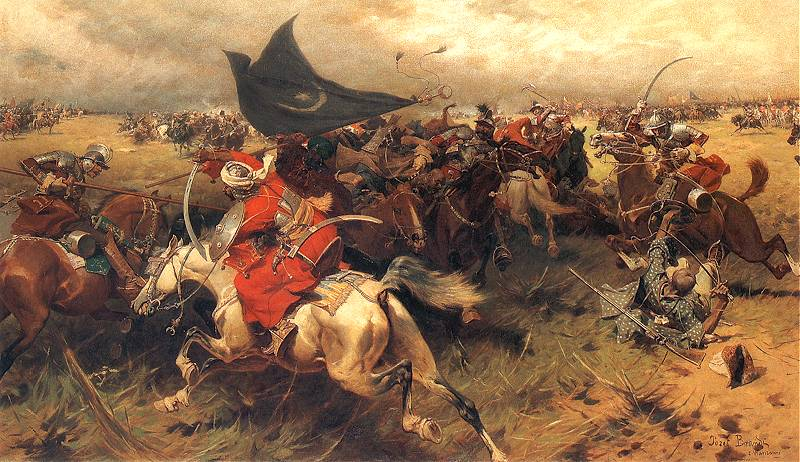
- "Struggle for the Turkish banner" by Józef Brandt.
Date	September 19–20, 1595
Location	near Țuțora and Prut river, Moldavia
Result	Polish-Lithuanian victory: Peace and the withdrawal of the Turks from Moldavia

Belligerents
Polish–Lithuanian Commonwealth; Moldavia	Ottoman Empire; Crimean Khanate

Commanders and leaders
Jan Zamoyski	Gazi II Girej

Strength
5,000 cavalry, 2,300 infantry, some artillery	25,000

Casualties and losses
Unknown	Unknown

The Battle of Cecora (also known as the Battle of Țuțora) took place on October 19–20, 1595, during an expedition of Jan Zamoyski, of the Polish–Lithuanian Commonwealth, to Moldavia, as part of the Moldavian Magnate Wars.

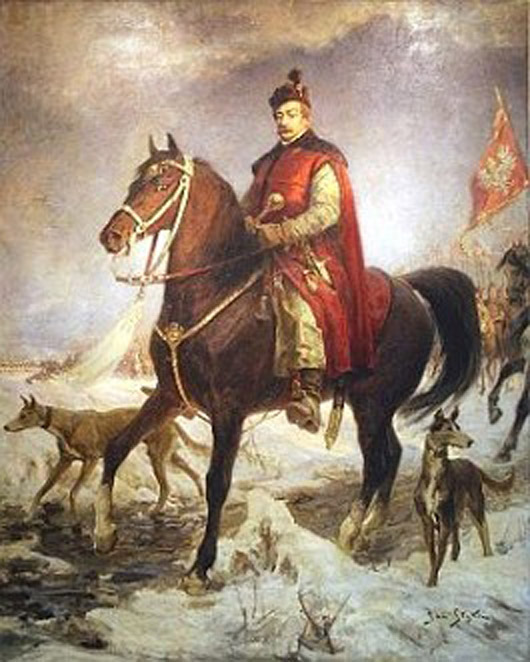
Hetman Jan Zamoyski, painting by Jan Styka.

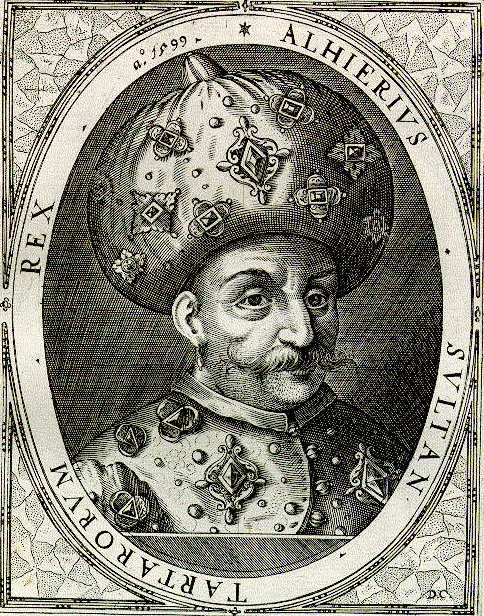
Khan Gazi II Girej.

== Background ==
In early 1595 Sigismund Báthory, Prince of Transylvania, convinced Ștefan Răzvan, a commander of Hungarian mercenaries in the service of the then Hospodar Aaron the Tyrant to rebel. Ștefan captured Aaron and sent him to Transylvania, then proclaimed himself as the new Hospodar and a vassal of Sigismund. In response the Ottoman Sultan Mehmed III, who had been Aaron's protector and sovereign, decided to put an end to the ongoing power struggles in Moldavia, Wallachia, and Transylvania between various magnates. While Wallachia was to receive a new Turkish sponsored ruler, Moldavia was to be simply incorporated into the Ottoman Empire as a province. The Ottoman intervention aroused alarms in the Polish–Lithuanian Commonwealth which sought to reestablish its influence in the region, having lost sovereignty over Moldavia some hundred years earlier after the Battle of the Cosmin Forest.

== Battle ==
In the summer of 1595 the crown army of the Kingdom of Poland, numbering around 5000 cavalry, 2300 infantry, and a few artillery pieces, led by the Crown Hetman Jan Zamoyski entered into the territory of the Principality of Moldavia and on the 27th of August took Chocim and shortly after, on September 3, the capital of the principality, Iași. Zamoyski then installed Ieremia Movilă, who was amicably disposed towards the Polish–Lithuanian Commonwealth, as Hospodar (Prince) of Moldavia. Zamoyski's intent was to create a buffer zone of friendly states around the Polish–Lithuanian Commonwealth, consisting of Moldavia, Transylvania, and Wallachia, in order to protect it from Ottoman Turkey.

The Ottomans reacted swiftly, although at the time Sultan Mehmed III was engaged in a war against Michael the Brave, the Prince of Wallachia. The Sultan sent the Crimean Tatars, under Khan Ğazı II Girej, supported by regular Ottoman troops, altogether numbering around 25,000 soldiers, to meet the Polish army. Upon hearing that the Tatars were approaching, Zamoyski crossed the Prut river and on September 6 had his troops erect a fortified camp, which was protected on both flanks by the river. The front of the camp in turn was defended by a rampart studded with thirteen bastions. The rampart also possessed four sally ports which could be used for sorties.

The Khan's army arrived on the 18th of September. That day minor fighting took place among individual skirmishers, during which Prince Kirill Różyński wounded the khan's nephew with a bow. The main fighting took place the following day when the khan's troops tried to storm the Polish camp. However, because the Tatars had few infantry the attempt was unsuccessful, and the attackers were constantly harried by Polish sallies issuing from the camp. After the struggle went no better for the Tartars on the 20th, Ğazı came to the conclusion that he did not have the means to take the camp and agreed to peace talks.

On October 21 a peace treaty was signed, according to which the Tatars recognized Movilă as Hospodar in Moldavia, and assented to Polish troops being permanently stationed in the Principality. Two days later the Tatar army began its withdrawal.
