= Battle of Suceava =

The battle of Suceava may refer to:

- Battle of Suceava (1595), during the Moldavian Magnate Wars
- Siege of Suceava (1653), during which Tymofiy Khmelnytsky was killed
- Battle of Suceava (1691), part of the Polish–Ottoman War (1683–1699)
