= Sack of Sarai (1502) =

1502 siege

| Date | January – 10 June 1502 |
| Location | Sarai, Great Horde (Golden Horde) |
| Result | Crimean victory: Destruction of the Golden Horde; Sheikh Ahmed fled to Lithuania |

Belligerents
| (Crimean Khanate) Crimean Khanate; Supported by: Ottoman Empire; Moldavia; Grand Principality of Moscow | Great Horde (Golden Horde) |

Commanders and leaders
| (Crimean Khanate) Meñli I Giray | Sheikh Ahmed |

The Sack of Sarai (1502) was a conflict between the Crimean Khanate and the Great Horde, the last remnant of the Golden Horde.

== Background ==
The Crimean Khan Meñli I Giray, seeking to become the dominant Tatar state, attacked Sarai. His forces defeated the Great Horde’s army, looted and destroyed the city, and forced Sheikh Ahmed to flee west. He was later captured and held as a prisoner. The sack ended the Great Horde, marking the official collapse of the Golden Horde in 1502. Estimated deaths ranged from a few hundred to over 1,000 soldiers, mostly from the Great Horde, while civilian casualties are unknown. After this, the Crimean Khanate became the strongest Tatar state in the region, and the steppe was open to Russian and other regional expansion.

== Aftermath ==
After the Sack of Sarai in 1502, Sheikh Ahmed fled west to escape capture by the Crimean Khanate. He first sought refuge with neighboring states, likely in the Polish–Lithuanian lands, trying to gather support to reclaim his power. Eventually, he was captured and held as a prisoner, marking the definitive end of his rule and the Great Horde.

== Sources ==
- Martin, Janet. Medieval Russia, 980-1584, Cambridge University Press, 1996.
