= Moldavian–Horde Wars =

Wars between Moldavia and Golden Horde

- Part of the Founding of Moldavia
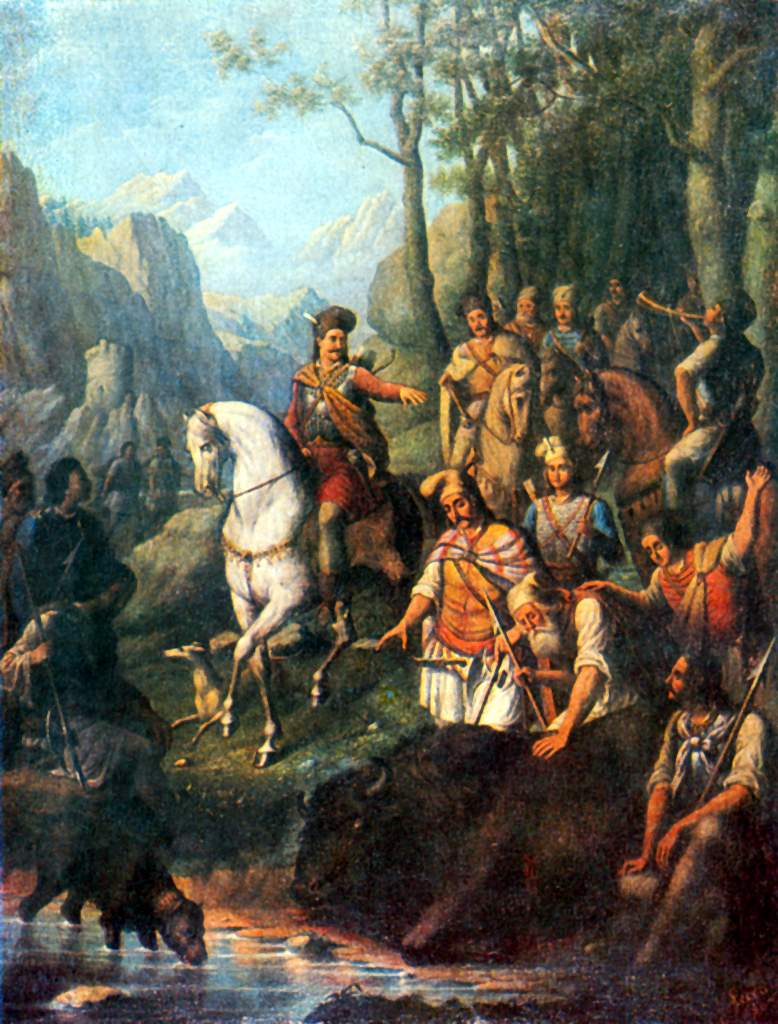
- Voivode Dragoș on a hunt by Constantin Lecca
Date	1352–1502
Location	Moldavia, Golden Horde and Wild Fields
Result	Moldavian victory; 1352–1354: Moldavian victory; 1362: Moldavian victory; 1399: Golden Horde victory; 1470: Moldavian victory; 1502: Moldavian victory
Territorial changes	Destruction of the Golden Horde at the Battle of the Samara River

Belligerents
Moldavia Supported by: Kingdom of Hungary (1352–1354) Grand Duchy of Lithuania (1362, 1399) Crimean Khanate (1502)	Golden Horde

Commanders and leaders
Dragoș Vodă; Sas; Bogdan I Stephen I Stephen III	Jani Beg; Abdallah; Temür Qutlugh; Ahmed Khan; Sheikh Ahmed

The Moldavian–Horde Wars refer to a series of conflicts between the Principality of Moldavia and Golden Horde, which also involved their respective allies or overlapped with broader conflicts. The first documented conflict between the Principality and Horde took place in 1352, lasting until 1502.

== Background ==
In 1345–1346, the Hungarian army supported by Vlachs from Maramureș went on a successful campaign against Tatars and established their fortifications east of the Carpathians. After this victory, Vlach voivode Dragoș was given permission by the Hungarian King Louis I to establish his principality named Moldavia, the purpose of which would become that of a military fief state, shielding the kingdom from Tatar raids. These events would lead to a series of conflicts between the Principality and the Horde, even after Moldavia established itself as independent in 1359.

== Wars ==
=== Campaign against Tatars (1352–1354) ===
In 1352, another Hungarian campaign against Tatars took place. The Hungarians were supported by Moldavians and local population of the territory that would become Moldavia. The campaign lasted until 1353 or 1354, solidifying the defense against further Tatar attacks east of Carpathians. Dragoș was rightfully proclaimed as the ruler of Moldavian lands.

=== Battle of Blue Waters (1362) ===
In the autumn of 1362 or 1363, a major battle took place at Syniukha river (present-day Ukraine) between the forces of Grand Duchy of Lithuania and the Golden Horde. The Principality of Moldavia sided with Lithuania in this battle. The battle resulted in a defeat of the Golden Horde, allowing Lithuania to occupy their claimed lands, while the Moldavians asserted their independence against Tatars.

=== Battle of the Vorskla River (1399) ===
On 12 August 1399, the Grand Duchy of Lithuania organised a defensive coalition against the Golden Horde. which included the troops of Principality of Moldavia. The battle took place at Vorskla river (present-day Ukraine), where the anti-Horde coalition had a slight numerical advantage. However, the Tatars managed to successfully employ feigned retreat and utilise their artillery, which led to the crushing defeat of the coalition.

=== Battle of Lipnic (1470) ===
In 1469 or 1470, the Tatars of the Golden Horde launched a large-scale raid on Moldavia, Poland, and Lithuania . On 20 August, the Moldavians confronted the Tatars at Lipnic (present-day Moldova). The battle ended in a crushing defeat for Ahmed Khan, with all the captives taken by Tatars being released by Moldavians.

Stephen III executed Ahmed Khan's son and nearly all envoys, cutting off the nose of a surviving one in response to subsequent threats of Ahmed Khan. However, Ahmed would later attempt to organise another attack on Moldavia and take revenge.

=== Battle of the Samara River (1502) ===
In 1502, Ottoman Sultan Bayezid II negotiated with Tatar Khan Sheikh Ahmed an attack on southern Moldavia, promising to support him with 40,000 troops if he reached and occupied the territory. However, Stephen III in response allied with Crimean Khan Meñli I Giray as a counterweight.

Stephen intended to wait with his army at the Samara river, Dnieper (present-day Ukraine), while the Crimean Tatars were on a campaign in the territory of the Great Horde. After the Tatars of the Golden Horde arrived to the opposite side of the river, Crimean Tatars returned to this area to assist the Moldavians. The battles which led to the crushing defeat of Sheikh Ahmed, marking the final blow to the Golden Horde.

== Aftermath and legacy ==
According to historian Jonathan Eagles, the Mongol invasion in 1241 and subsequent occupation by Tatars created a basis for the formation of Moldavian Principality. Alexander I during his reign expanded the Principality's territory at the expense of Tatars. The Principality was viewed by the Ottoman Empire as an obstacle to their further expansion, which caused numerous conflicts between the Principality and Ottomans. Ottomans sometimes supported the Golden Horde against the Principality and encouraged conflicts, such as in 1502.
