= Battle of Lipnic =

Battle

- Part of the Moldavian–Horde Wars
Date	20 August 1470
Location	Lipnic, Moldavia
Result	Moldavian victory

Belligerents
Moldavia	Golden Horde

Commanders and leaders
(Moldavia) Stephen III	Ahmed Khan

Strength
Unknown	Unknown

Casualties and losses
Unknown	Very heavy

The Battle of Lipnic (or Lipnica, or Lipniți) was a battle between the Moldavian forces under Stephen the Great, and the Volga Tatars of the Golden Horde led by Ahmed Khan, and which took place on the August 20, 1470.

== Battle ==
In the summer of 1470 (other sources give 1469), Ahmed Khan, the Great Khan of the Great Horde, the central principality of the Mongol-Tatar Golden Horde, organized an attack against Moldavia, the Kingdom of Poland, and Lithuania.

Stephen and the Polish king Casimir IV Jagiellon were previously informed of the future attack by the Khan of the Crimean Khanate, Meñli I Giray (1466-1515, with intermittence), who was an occasional ally of Stephen the Great, and had a clear stance against the Golden Horde.

The hordes unleashed a three-directional attack via Podolia, being conducted by the brother and son of the Khan. They first raided and pillaged the eastern territories of Poland, and as Casimir failed to gather enough forces to attack them, the Tatars then headed southwards against Moldavia. Chronicles speak of several clashes and two other battles both of which being won by the Moldavians. Nevertheless, the final and most violent was to take place at Lipniți, a village near the Dniester, in the Soroca County, modern Republic of Moldova.

By this time, the Tatars had started to retreat carrying into slavery several thousand women and children, hundreds of herds of cattle, horses, and flocks of sheep. By August 20, Stephen managed to swerve this Tatar convoy, and to divert them to a trap set at the edge of the lime tree forest near Lipnic, and to force the Tatars to face the Moldavians in an open battle.

There are no actual descriptions of the battle, but it is accounted as to have been a bloody and violent one. Large numbers from the ranks of both the Moldavians and of the Tatars perished. While most of the Tatars died in the battle itself, a large number of them actually drowned in the Dniester while attempting escape by fleeing. Numerous Tatars were captured, including the Khan’s son. The Khan’s brother died in the battle.

== Aftermath ==
Stephen conditioned the life of the Khan's son on his father's making peace with Moldavia, stating that his son would live until the exact day that a Tatar would touch the land of Moldavia. However, the Khan's son was eventually killed, after an episode at Stephens's court. This episode is mentioned by Stanislaus Sarnicius (Sarnicki), as well as by Jan Długosz in his Historia Polonica:

The other Tatars, heading towards Moldavia, were chased away by the Moldavians, these being also helped by the difficulty of the terrain. On the third battle, the winners being the Tatars they had killed many people. However, they had lost the son of Ahmed, caught alive by the Moldavians. Ahmed thought that, as time passed, he could more easily ransom his son. Sending 100 messengers to Stephen, the Voivode of Moldavia, he announced to him with great insolence that if he [Stephen] did not give freedom back to his son, or does a wrong due to him, he would to inflict a severe punishment. But Stephen, a man with an amiable soul, angered by that message, which could easily have scared other men, disregarding Ahmed threats, cut his son into four pieces in front of the heralds, impaled all the heralds except one, who, having his nose cut off, was sent back to Ahmed to inform him of what happened. This is how Stephen avenged the shadows of his dead.

Ahmed Khan failed to organize a new attack against Stephen. By 1502, the Great Horde was completely destroyed by Stephen the Great and his ally Meñli I Giray of the Crimean Khanate. Stephen took measures to protect his eastern frontier, strengthened the Orhei and Tighina fortresses, and built the Soroca fortress, thus completing the Eastern line of defence along the river Nistru. Tatar attacks continued against Moldavia, this time from the other Tataric states from north of the Black Sea.

== Footnotes and References ==
=== General ===
- Șerban Papacostea: Relaţiile internaţionale ale Moldovei in vremea lui Ştefan cel Mare.
- Collection of historic sources on stefancelmare.ro (Romanian)

== See also ==
- Tatar invasions
- Moldavian military forces
- Battle of the Vorskla River
- Borzeşti Church
