= Delia Grigore =

Romani writer, philologist, academic and activist (born 1972)

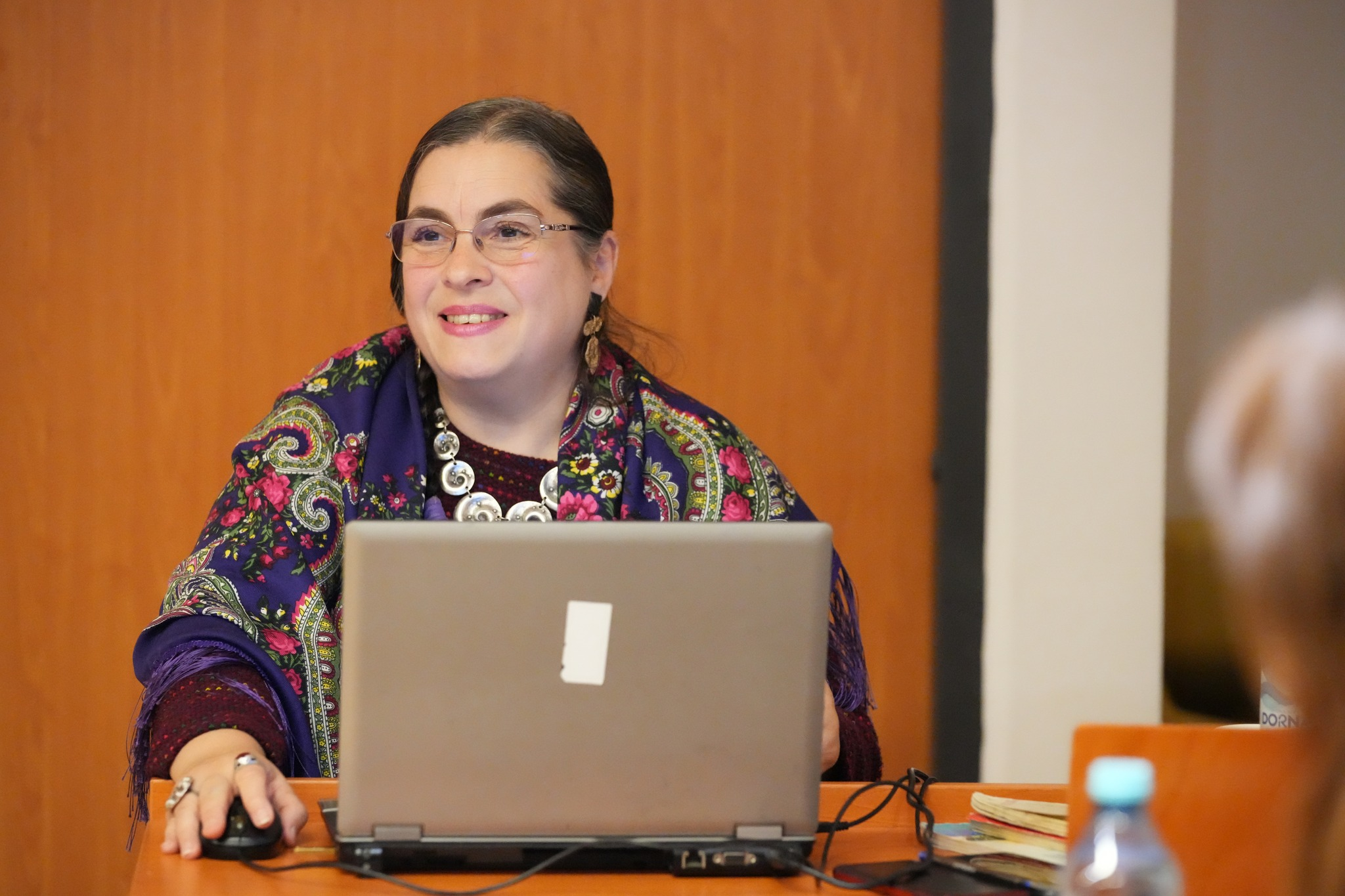
- Born: February 7, 1972; Galați, Socialist Republic of Romania
- Education: University of Bucharest
- Occupations: writer, philologist, academic, activist

Delia Grigore (Romani: Deliya Grigore; born February 7, 1972) is a Romanian Romani writer, philologist, academic and activist.

== Biography ==
Grigore was born on February 7, 1972, in Galați, and grew up under the Romanian communist regime, when the Roma were not recognized as an ethnic group, but as foreign elements that must assimilate in Romanian society. During that time, her family hid their real identity so as to avoid discrimination. After the Romaniann Revolution of 1989 she could reassert her Romani ethnicity and relearn the language. In 1990, she completed secondary studies at the Zoia Kosmodemianskaia High School in Bucharest, while in 1992 she graduated the Sanskrit Language and Indian Old Civilization and Culture course from the University of Bucharest. In 1995 she obtained a degree in Romanian and English philology from the Faculty of Philology at the University of Bucharest. Since 2000, Delia Grigore has published a series of writings about Romani culture and language.

In 2002, Grigore obtained a Doctorate in the Anthropology of the Romani culture with the Ph.D. thesis Family Customs of the Rromani Traditional Culture with Nomadic Identity Pattern in the South East of Romania. Currently, she teaches in the Department of Foreign Languages and Literatures at the University of Bucharest. She also became involved in the defense of Romani rights as the president of the Association ȘATRA/A.S.T.R.A. – "Amare Rromentza".

In February 2002, Grigore requested that the Romanian state authorities and the leadership of the Romanian Orthodox Church acknowledge their responsibility for the enforcement and the consequences of five centuries of slavery of the Romani people in the historical Romanian states of Wallachia and Moldavia.

== Writings ==
- Siklioven i Rromani chib - Ghid de limbă și cultură rromani "Learn Rromani language - Guidelines of Rromani Language and Culture" (2000, Aven Amentza, Bucharest)
- Rromanipen-ul (rromani dharma) și mistica familiei "Rromanipen (Rromani Dharma) and the Family Mystics" (2001, Salvați copiii, Bucharest)
- Introducere în studiul culturii tradiționale rromani - Curs de antropologie rromani "Introduction in the Study of Rromani Traditional Culture - Course of Rromani Anthropology" (2001, CREDIS, University of Bucharest)
- Rromii: tipuri și arhetipuri identitare "Rroma: Identity Types and Archetypes" a chapter in Rromii și cultura populară română. Patrin thai iag "Rroma and the Romanian Folk Culture. Leaf and fire" (2002, Aven Amentza, Bucharest), coordinator: Vasile Ionescu
- Istoria și tradițiile minorității rromani "History and Traditions of the Rromani Minority" (2005, Sigma, Bucharest), written together with Petre Petcuț and Mariana Sandu

== See also ==
- Roma minority in Romania
