= Ștefan Răzvan =

Voivode of Moldavia (died 1595)

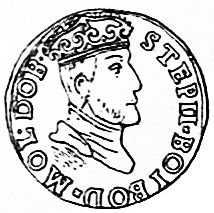
- Ștefan Răzvan as Voivode of Moldavia on his coin

Prince of Moldavia
- Reign: 24 April – August 1595
- Predecessor: Aaron the Tyrant
- Successor: Ieremia Movilă
- Born: unknown
- Died: December 1595
- Religion: Eastern Orthodoxy prev. Sunni Islam

Ștefan Răzvan (died December 1595) was a voivode (prince) of Moldavia as Ștefan VIII Răzvan (between 24 April 1595 and August 1595).

== Biography ==
Ștefan Răzvan's father was a Muslim Romani from the Ottoman Empire who emigrated north of the Danube, in Wallachia, while his mother was a Romanian peasant from the new country of settlement. At that time, all Romani people living in the Romanian states of Wallachia and Moldavia were slaves. The rule was also applied to any Romani immigrants, except Muslim Ottoman citizens. Benefiting from this exception, the father and later the son could remain free and become active members of the local society. Other theories exist about his origin, including one that states that his father was a Roma enslaved by Michael the Brave.

Răzvan appears as a political player at the beginning of Michael the Brave's rule in Wallachia (1593–1601), as a close noble ally of the Wallachian prince. He previously converted from Islam to Christianity, attracting the wrath of the Ottoman Turks. He had the social status of a boyar and was a cultured person. Later, he became involved in the politics of the neighbouring Romanian country of Moldavia, where he was appointed as part of the princely council, with the title of hatman (second in rank in the army after the prince), during the reign of Aaron the Tyrant. He led the campaigns of the Moldavian army against Tighina, Chilia, Cetatea Albă, and northern Dobruja, then occupied by the Ottomans. Răzvan became popular among the soldiers and, with their support and the help of the Transylvanian prince Sigismund Báthory, he ousted Aaron the Tyrant (whose image was eroded among the population) on 24 April 1595.

Răzvan's leadership did not last long, because the neighboring political power, the Polish–Lithuanian Commonwealth, did not agree with his alliance with Transylvania and Wallachia. They invaded Moldavia in August, bringing Ieremia Movilă as the prince accepted by the Poles. The decisive battle was fought on the Suceava plains (on 3 December 1595) and concluded after three hours, with a Polish victory. Răzvan fled towards Transylvania, but he was captured and impaled.

Preceded by Aaron the Tyrant	Prince/Voivode of Moldavia; 24 April 1595 – August 1595	Succeeded by Ieremia Movilă

== Bibliography ==
- Istoria și tradițiile minorității rromani, p. 28, 2005, Sigma, Bucharest, Delia Grigore, Petre Petcuț and Mariana Sandu
