= Șcheia =

Şcheia may refer to several places in Romania:

- Şcheia, a commune in Iași County
- Şcheia, a commune in Suceava County
- Șcheia River, a tributary of the Suceava River
- Şcheia, a village in Alexandru Ioan Cuza commune, Iași County
