= Siege of Bar (1550) =

1550 Moldavian raid into Poland

- Part of the Polish-Moldavian Wars and Polish-Ottoman Wars
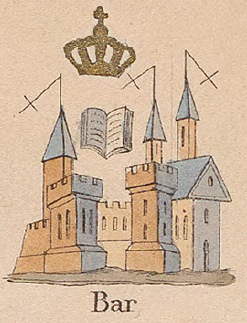
- Bar on the map of Zygmunt Herstmann
Date	13 February 1550
Location	Bar, Podolian Voivodeship, Kingdom of Poland
Result	Polish victory

Belligerents
Kingdom of Poland	Moldavia; Wallachia

Commanders and leaders
Bernard Pretwicz; Dmytro Vyshnevetsky; Mikołaj Sieniawski	Unknown Moldavian commander (POW)

Strength
Unknown	5,000 men

Casualties and losses
Likely light	Over 100 killed during the siege; Half of the army killed during the pursuing by Pretwicz

The Siege of Bar (Note: Polish: Oblężenie Baru Ukrainian: Облога Бару, Барська облога) was a siege of a Polish garrison led by Bernard Pretwicz in the fortress Bar (now Ukraine) by Moldavian-Wallachian army that took place in February of 1550.

Ottoman sultan Suleiman the Magnificent ordered Moldavians to attack Podolia, possibly to capture Bernard Pretwicz. They attacked the region and besieged Bar, the siege however failed and the Romanian army withdrew to Ottoman Empire, but at the same time Pretwicz was soon deposed from the seat of starosta in Bar, ending a series of his military campaigns.

== Background ==
Bernard Pretwicz was an active participant of the "border war", (Note: The name given by Hrushevskyi to the conflict that consisted the Tatar raids into Ukrainian lands and the counter-raids by border starostas and Zaporozhian Cossacks) of XVI century. He led numerous campaigns against the Tatars, reportedly winning over 70 battles against them. His most well-known raids took place in March 1540 and 1541, when he attacked Ochakov and Akkerman, in 1545, when he led a major naval expedition and sacked Ochakov, in 1547 and 1548, when he twice raided Jedisan. Many sources mention that the attack on Ukrainian lands was directly ordered by Suleiman the Magnificent as a response to Pretwicz's border raids on the Ottoman and Tatar territories.

== Siege ==
On 13 of February 1550, a large 5,000-strong Moldavian-Wallachian army crossed the Dniester river near Mohyliv and attacked Bar. Soon, Moldavians entered the city, but Pretwicz had already led his army out of the castle. A battle took place, as a result of which, the Moldavians were defeated, suffering heavy casualties, reportedly up to 100 cavalrymen were killed in the battle. After the failure of their assaults, Moldavians started retreating from Poland. Pretwicz then chased the attackers, caught up with them and defeated, reportedly killing "half of the Vlach army" and capturing one of their commanders. Some of the Moldavian army remnants were routed by Mikołaj Sieniawski.

Mykhailo Hrushevskyi gives a different view of the siege, however. According to him, the Moldavians besieged Bar, but due to artillery fire and resistance of the garrison were forced to withdraw back, destroying the villages that laid in their path, yet not being routed.

== Aftermath ==
In December of the same year, Pretwicz was summoned to a Sejm, where he was accused of violating the peace on the Borderlands. He had explained the Moldavian invasion by the willing to devastate the local villages and to return the Moldavian colonizers that had escaped to Podolia. Different explanation was given by the Moldavian prince Ilie Rareș, who had explained the attack by "simply following Suleimans order". Yuri Soroka mentions Dmytro Vyshnevetsky participating in the defense of Bar from Moldavians. Later, Pretwicz conducted one more anti-Ottoman raid before being deposed from the seat of the Bar starosta due to numerous complaints from the Ottoman government and instead being appointed as a starosta of Trembowla. Vyshnevetsky, who had also participated in the city defense, was appointed as a starosta of Kaniv and Cherkasy same year.
