= Great Horde =

Rump state of the Golden Horde

Great Horde اولوغ اوردا Uluğ Orda
- 15th century–1502
- Territories of the Great Horde
- Status: Khanate
- Capital: Sarai
- Common languages: Kipchak languages
- Religion: Sunni Islam
- Government: Hereditary monarchy
- Khan
  - 1459-1465: Mahmud bin Küchük
  - 1481-1502: Sheikh Ahmed (last)
- Historical era: Middle Ages
  - Established: Mid 15th century
  - Great Stand on the Ugra River: 1480
  - Sack of Sarai by the Crimean Khanate: 10 June 1502
  - Battle of Samara River ending the Great Horde: 28 June 1502
Preceded by	Succeeded by
Golden Horde	Crimean Khanate; Astrakhan Khanate
- Today part of: Kazakhstan; Russia

The Great Horde (اولوغ اوردا, Uluğ Orda) was the rump state of the Golden Horde that existed from the mid-15th century to 1502. It was centered at the core of the former Golden Horde at Sarai on the lower Volga.

Both the Khanate of Astrakhan and the Khanate of Crimea broke away from the Great Horde throughout its existence, and were hostile to the Great Horde. According to later Russian tradition, the retreat of the forces of the Great Horde at the Great Stand on the Ugra River opposed by Ivan III of Russia marked the end of the "Tatar yoke" over Russia.

== Fragmentation of the Golden Horde (1419–1433) ==
The Golden Horde of Jochi had been showing cracks in the 14th century, with periods of chaos within the polity. It was united by Tokhtamysh in the 1390s, but the invasion of Timur during this time further weakened the Horde. The death of Edigu (the last person to ever unite the Horde) in 1419 marked one of the final steps of the decay of the Golden Horde, which fractured into the separate states of the Nogai Khanate, the Kazan Khanate, and later the Kasimov Khanate, which had separated itself from Kazan. Each one of these Khanates claimed to be the legitimate successor to the Golden Horde. The Great Horde itself was centered on the Golden Horde's capital city of Sarai, with its territory being led by four tribes: the Qiyat, the Manghud, the Sicivud, and the Qonqirat.

The Great Horde was originally simply referred to as the Orda, or Horde, but it became increasingly important for the disparate hordes in the region to be distinguished from each other, which in sources of the 1430s led to the first mentions of the "Great Horde" (Большая Орда, Bol'shaja Orda or Великая Орда, Velikaja Orda in Russian; Улуг Орда, Uluġ Orda or Улуг Улус, Uluġ Ulus in Old Tatar). The name "Great Horde" might have been used to directly link the (now greatly reduced) administrative center of the Horde to the original greatness of the Golden Horde.

== Co-reign of Küchük Muhammad and Sayid Ahmad I (1433–1459) ==
Starting from the 1430s, both Küchük Muhammad and Sayid Ahmad I were in power within the Horde of Sarai. During this time, the Horde lost control of Crimea as Hacı I Giray (brother of Devlet Berdi, who had previously wrested control of Crimea for himself from the Golden Horde) had kicked out authority from Sarai in August 1449. This is accepted as the way the Crimean Khanate became independent, which kicked off a rivalry between Crimea and the Great Horde. Küchük Muhammad drove out Ulugh Muhammad from the heartland of the Golden Horde in 1438, being proclaimed Khan in Sarai. Ulugh Muhammad was forced to leave the steppe, and migrated with his Horde eastward towards the mid-Volga region, and founded the Khanate of Kazan there.

Throughout the rules of Küchük Muhammad and Sayid Ahmad I, the Tatars tried to force their Russian subjects to pay taxes, invading them in 1449, 1450, 1451 and 1452. These attacks led to retaliation from the Polish-Lithuanian Commonwealth, who allied with the Crimean Khanate. At the same time, envoys from Lithuanian nobles who were unhappy being under a Polish-dominant Commonwealth brought gifts to Sayid Ahmad, who invaded Poland-Lithuania in 1453. In 1455, the Crimeans again attacked Sarai, forcing Sayid Ahmad to flee to Kiev. However, a force led by Andrzej Odrowąż marched upon Kiev and captured him, leading him to die in prison. Further raids include a Tatar raid on Podolia in 1457 (ending in victory for the Tatars) and one in 1459 on Muscovy (ending in a victory for the Muscovites).

== Reigns of Mahmud and Ahmed (1459–1481) ==
Küchük Muhammad was succeeded by his son Mahmud bin Küchük in 1459. Mahmud was usurped by his brother Ahmed Khan bin Küchük in 1465. Mahmud headed to Astrakhan, seceding and forming the Astrakhan Khanate. This led to the creation of a rivalry between the two Khanates, ending with Ahmed's descendants occupying the throne of Astrakhan in 1502.

In 1469, Ahmed attacked and killed the Uzbek Abu'l-Khayr Khan. In the summer of 1470, Ahmed organized an attack against Moldavia, the Kingdom of Poland, and Lithuania. The Moldavian forces under Stephen the Great defeated the Tatars at the battle of Lipnic (20 August 1470).

By the 1470s, Muscovy had stopped paying tribute to Sarai, but continued to maintain diplomatic relations with them. In 1474 and 1476, Ahmed insisted that Ivan III of Russia recognize the khan as his overlord. In 1480, Ahmed organized a military campaign against Moscow, resulting in a face off between two opposing armies known as the Great Stand on the Ugra River. Ahmed judged the conditions unfavorable and retreated. This incident formally ended the "Tatar yoke" over Russia. On 6 January 1481, Ahmed was killed by Ibak Khan, the prince of the Khanate of Sibir, and Nogays at the mouth of the Donets River.

== Great Horde and Lithuania versus Crimean Khanate and Muscovy (1486–1502) ==
From 1486 to 1491, a conflict raged between the Sarai-based Great Horde and the Crimean Khanate, which had become a vassal state of the Ottoman Empire in 1475. The Muscovite prince Ivan III sided with Crimean khan Meñli I Giray, while Casimir IV Jagiellon of Lithuania and Poland allied himself with the Great Horde. The thus-caused Lithuanian–Muscovite War (1487–1494) was settled by a peace treaty and marriage alliance between Alexander Jagiellon of Lithuania and Helena of Moscow.

From 1500 to 1502, the same two alliances fought a war after several Lithuanian princes defected to Muscovy, and Ivan III declared war on Alexander under the pretext that his daughter Helena had been forcibly converted to Catholicism despite the 1494 marital agreement that she could keep her Orthodox faith.

== Fall of the Great Horde (1502) ==
in 1502, the Crimean Khanate subjugated what remained of the Great Horde, sacking Sarai in 1502. The Great Horde finally dissipated, remnants of the Great Horde were wiped out at the Battle of Samara River by the Moldavian-Crimean army, and Lithuania thus lost its ally against Moscow. Lithuania and Muscovy agreed to a truce in 1503, bringing more territorial gains for the latter. After seeking refuge in Lithuania, Sheikh Ahmed, the last khan of the Horde, died in prison in Kaunas some time after 1504. According to other sources, he was released from the Lithuanian prison in 1527.

== Economy ==
Just like for the preceding Golden Horde, the main source of revenue of the Great Horde was collecting transit fees and customs duties from the commercial traffic along the lower Volga river. The khans at Sarai controlled a decreasing number of tributary vassals from previous centuries, losing the southwestern Rus' (Ruthenian) principalities to the Grand Duchy of Lithuania, and in the 1470s its traditional ally in the north, Muscovy, refusing to pay tribute any longer. By the second half of the 15th century, the Great Horde found itself unable to properly control and protect trade on the lower Volga anymore either.

Tverian merchant Afanasy Nikitin recounted in his famous travelogue A Journey Beyond the Three Seas how he had no troubles sailing the Volga downstream from Tver in 1466–1468, until his group of merchants was attacked and robbed by bandits near Astrakhan. Returning from Persia, Venetian diplomat Ambrogio Contarini had his property confiscated at Astrakhan when he passed through in 1475–1476; he was compelled to pay a large ransom to get it back. Contarini described 'the country between [Astrakhan] and Muscovy... [as] a continual desert.' There were no way stations, no places to buy provisions, and fresh water was hard to come by. He spotted some camels and horses that were apparently abandoned or lost by a previous caravan that presumably had suffered an ill fate as well.

Ahmad Khan made it a policy to raid merchant caravans carrying valuable goods across his territory, in order to make up for these losses in revenue, but thus destabilising commerce in the region even further. Moreover, the Great Horde raided the territory of its neighbouring states for extra spoils, including the Oka river border with its nominal vassal Muscovy from the late 1440s onwards. A 1460 attack on Ryazan by the Sarai khan served the same purpose. In 1472, by which time Ahmad Khan was allied with Lithuania, which urged him to raid territory of their mutual Muscovite enemy, the Great Horde burnt down the town of Aleksin and crossed the Oka, but was then repelled.

== Khans of the Great Horde ==
1. Küchük Muhammad (1435-1459)
2. Mahmud bin Küchük (1459-1465)
3. Ahmed Khan bin Küchük (1465-1481)
4. Murtaza Khan as co-ruler with Sheikh Ahmed (1481-1498)
5. Murtaza Khan (1498-1499)
6. Sheikh Ahmed (1499-1502)

== Other uses ==
The Crimean Khanate considered itself the legal successor of the Golden Horde and Desht-i Kipchak, and called themselves khans of "the Great Horde, the Great State and the Throne of the Crimea".

== See also ==
- List of wars and battles involving the Golden Horde, including the Great Horde

== Sources ==
- Halperin, Charles J. (1987). Russia and the Golden Horde: The Mongol Impact on Medieval Russian History. Indiana University. p. 222. ISBN 9781850430575. (e-book).
- Howorth, Sir Henry Hoyle (1888). History of the Mongols, from the 9th to the 19th Century. Burt Franklin.
- Khodarkovsky, Michael (2002). Russia's Steppe Frontier.
- Kołodziejczyk, Dariusz (2011). The Crimean Khanate and Poland-Lithuania: International Diplomacy on the European Periphery (15th–18th Century). A Study of Peace Treaties Followed by Annotated Documents. Leiden: Brill. ISBN 978-90-04-19190-7.
- Martin, Janet (2007). Medieval Russia: 980–1584. Second Edition. E-book. Cambridge: Cambridge University Press. ISBN 978-0-511-36800-4.
- Vásáry, István (2012). "The Crimean Khanate and the Great Horde (1440s–1500s): A Fight for Primacy" (PDF). In Meinolf Arens; Denise Klein (eds.). Das frühneuzeitliche Krimkhanat (16.-18. Jahrhundert) zwischen Orient und Okzident. Harrassowitz: Wiesbaden. pp. 13–26.
- Vernadsky, George (1953), The Mongols and Russia, Yale University Press
