= Moldavian Campaign (1484–1486) =

Ottoman military expedition

- Part of the Moldavian–Ottoman Wars
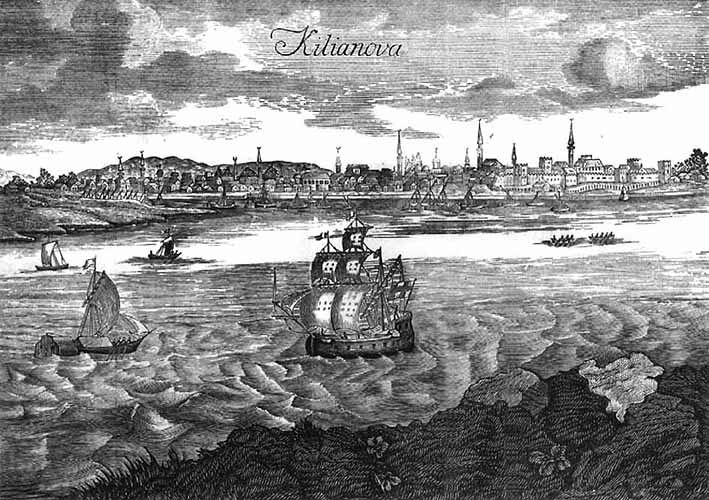
- Chilia in 15th century
Date	1484–1486
Location	Moldavia
Result	Ottoman victory

Belligerents
Ottoman Empire; Crimean Khanate	Moldavia; Kingdom of Poland

Commanders and leaders
Bayezid II; Hadım Ali Pasha; Mihaloğlu İskender Paşa	Stephen the Great; Jan Karnkowski

Strength
Unknown total	Unknown total: 3,000 Polish mercenaries

Casualties and losses
Unknown	Unknown

The Moldavian campaign was a military expedition by the Ottoman Sultan Bayezid II against the Principality of Moldavia. The Ottomans managed to conquer the fortress of Chilia and Cetatea Albă, confirming Ottoman supremacy of the Black Sea.

== Background ==
The Moldavian prince, Stephen the Great, and the Ottoman Sultan, Mehmed II, signed a peace treaty in 1479 to stabilize the relations but forced the Moldavian prince to pay tribute to the Ottomans. After the death of Mehmed, his son Bayezid II succeeded him. Aware of the Sultan's intention to attack Moldavia, Stephan decided to switch his vassalage to Poland. Stephan asked the Polish king Casimir IV Jagiellon to become his vassal in exchange for protection from the Ottomans. Casimir agreed; however, he was too slow to give help to the Moldavians. In the year 1484, the Ottoman Sultan prepared to attack Moldavia. The Poles didn't know which direction the Sultan would attack. The Sultan launched his campaign with the Crimean Tatars.

== Campaign ==
The Ottoman Sultan decided not to attack the Moldavians in the ravine forests but instead to attack the Moldavian strongholds of Chilia and Cetatea Albă. First, Bayezid marched inland towards Chilia while the fleet was moving offshore. As the Ottoman fleet stopped at Chilia Road, it found the Danube channel, 30 kilometers upstream from Chilia, was impassable due to low water or sabotage. This forced the fleet to unload the cannons. They were dragged to the fortress with great difficulty due to muddy lowland. The Ottomans arranged their cannons, and after a few days of bombardment, Chilia surrendered. The cannons were loaded into ships and sailed directly to Cetatea Albă. The process was repeated, and when the bombardment commenced, the stronghold surrendered.

The Moldavian garrisons and the Polish mercenary units showed fierce resistance, but the Ottoman technique of cannon transport to land defeated them. The Ottomans swept through the Moldavian countryside, defeating any Moldavian resistance. The Beylerbey Hadım Ali Pasha raided all the way to Suceava, which covered the main Ottoman army withdrawal. The victorious Ottomans garrisoned the two forts and strengthened them. The Moldavians received a support force of 3,000 Polish, Czech, and German cavalry led by Jan Karnkowski. This force, although small, was instrumental; the Moldavians and the Poles managed to defeat the Ottomans led by Iskender Bey Mihaloglu at Cătlăbuga, 20 kilometers from Chilia, on November 16, 1485.

On March 6 of 1486, Stephan defeated another Ottoman raiding party near the town of Romanov. Despite these victories, the Moldavians failed to recapture the lost forts of Chilia and Cetatea Albă. Stephan was forced to bring the war to an end in 1486.

== Aftermath ==
The Moldavians and the Ottomans made a peace treaty. The treaty confirmed the Ottoman possessions of Chilia and Cetatea Albă. It also confirmed the tribute payment and military aid to the Ottomans if requested. In return, the Ottomans were not to expand beyond those two fortresses, and Moldavia's autonomy was respected, including its customs, religion, and laws, together with the Boyars' right to choose their own prince.

The loss of Chilia and Cetatea Albă was a major blow to Stephan, not only in terms of economy, but also because it strained his military freedom and allowed the Ottomans to interfere in Moldavian affairs. Already in 1489, the Polish king recognized the Ottoman control of the two fortresses, which made Stephan furious and ended relations with Poland.

== Sources ==
- Vladimir Shirogorov (2021), War on the Eve of Nations, Conflicts and Militaries in Eastern Europe, 1450–1500.
- Rebecca Haynes (2020), Moldova, A History.
- Norman Housley (2016), The Crusade in the Fifteenth Century, Converging and Competing Cultures.
