= Alexander the Good's expedition to Podolia =

- Part of Moldavian–Polish War
Date	Mid–August 1431
Location	Podolia
Result	Polish victory

Belligerents
Kingdom of Poland	Moldavia

Commanders and leaders
Michał Buczacki; Teodoryk Buczacki; Michał Mużyło Buczacki	Alexander the Good

Strength
About 2,000–3,000	Several thousand.

Casualties and losses
Unknown	Heavy

The Alexander the Good's expedition to Podolia took place in Mid–August 1431 between the Principality of Moldavia ruled by Alexander I of Moldavia and the Kingdom of Poland under Władysław II Jagiełło. The attack occurred while the Polish royal army was engaged in the siege of Lutsk during the conflict with Lithuania. Taking advantage of this situation, the Moldavian ruler crossed into Polish territory with several thousand troops and began a large-scale raid.

== Background ==
At the beginning of his reign in 1431, Švitrigaila formed an alliance with the Moldavian voivode, Alexander the Good, aimed against Władysław Jagiełło. The alliance was close enough that the Lithuanian prince reportedly considered marrying Alexander the Good's daughter.

== Expedition ==
In the summer of 1431, when the royal army was besieging Lutsk, Alexander entered Polish lands with a force of several thousand. Advancing from the area of Chernivtsi through Pokuttya, he captured and destroyed Sniatyn and Kolomyia, then headed toward Halicz and crossed the Dniester into Podolia. The Moldavian units scattered throughout the area, plundering villages and taking the population into captivity, not expecting a swift Polish response.

When news of the raid reached the camp near Lutsk, Jagiełło sent a force against the invaders under the command of the Buczacki brothers Michał Buczacki, Teodoryk Buczacki, and Michał Mużyło Buczacki. Together with the Rus’ and Podolian levy cavalry, numbering around 2,000–3,000 thousand, they made a very rapid march from the Lutsk region into Podolia. The surprised and scattered Moldavian units were successively defeated, and the Poles recovered the plunder and prisoners, forcing Alexander's troops to flee beyond the Dniester.

== Aftermath ==
After driving out the invaders, the Poles once again occupied Pokuttya and some borderlands, garrisoning them. The raid was repelled, but the conflict led to the end of Moldavia's vassal dependence on Poland and worsened relations between the two states.
