= Battle of Botoșani =

1498 battle between Moldavia and Ottoman Empire

- Part of the Moldavian–Ottoman Wars
Date	November 1498
Location	Botoșani, Moldavia (present-day Botoșani County, Romania)
Result	Moldavian victory

Belligerents
Moldavia	Ottoman Empire

Commanders and leaders
Stephen III	(Ottoman Empire) Unknown pasha

Strength
55,000 (Note: Maximum possible extent of Moldavian army.)	70,000

Casualties and losses
Unknown	60,000 dead (Note: 40,000 Ottoman troops perished of cold and 20,000 fell in battle, leaving Sultan Bayezid II with only 10,000 troops after battle.)

The Battle of Botoșani took place in November 1498, between the Moldavian army of Voivode Stephen the Great and Ottoman forces of Sultan Bayezid II, resulting in Moldavian victory and a disastrous route of the Ottoman army.

== Prelude ==
During the Polish campaign against the Principality of Moldavia and the broader Polish–Ottoman War, Moldavian voivode Stephen the Great launched an invasion of Poland in 1498, in response to the Polish invasion a year prior.

Although the Ottoman Empire was on the side of Moldavia in this war and were de jure suzerains of the Moldavian Principality, Stephen's relations with Sultan Bayezid II remained tense. This led to armed confrontations between the Ottoman Empire and Moldavia during 1498–1500, as Stephen wanted to curb Ottoman influence over Moldavia. Stephen was also unhappy with Tatar raids close to his border, which were enabled by the Ottomans.

== Battle ==
In late November 1498, the 70,000-strong Ottoman army of Sultan Bayezid II passed through Wallachia and was returning with loot from their raids on the Kingdom of Poland, which affected many regions, but Galicia and Podolia in particular. The size of the ambushing Moldavian army is unknown, but could've reached up to 55,000, in the case of Stephen the Great implementing full mobilization.

The Ottoman army begun to suffer from cold, as they were proceeding to pass through Moldavia back into the Ottoman lands. Voivode Stephen the Great of Moldavia exploited this opportunity to strike Sultan's forces, utilising the environment in his favour. The Moldavians disguised themselves as Polish troops, unexpectedly striking the exhausted Ottomans with a "speed of the Tatars and an agile bravery that was not to be found anywhere else". Stephen inflicted a crushing defeat on Sultan's army, leading to disastrous losses among the Ottomans. The Moldavians "didn't spare the pagans".

== Aftermath ==
The battle resulted in Moldavian victory. Ottoman losses constituted 60,000 troops, 40,000 of which perished from cold, while 20,000 were destroyed in direct battle with Moldavians. Only 10,000 troops from Sultan Bayezid II's army managed to return.

Stephen refused to continue paying tribute to the Porte. On 5 January 1499, Stephen the Great's army ambushed and routed another Ottoman army crossing the Prut river, which was returning with loot after their raids on the Kingdom of Poland. On 16 April, Moldavia concluded peace with Poland. However, the peace treaty was violated in 1500, as a result of Polish attack on Moldavia. On 14 March the Polish army was routed by Moldavians at Botoșani. The same year, Stephen ordered to set on fire Ottoman-controlled fortresses of Chilia and Cetatea Albă.
