= Battle of the Samara River =

1502 battle between Moldavia and Golden Horde

Battle of Samara River
- Part of the Moldavian–Horde Wars
Date	June 1502
Location	Samara river, Dnieper, Wild Fields (present-day Ukraine)
Result	Moldavian–Crimean victory
Territorial changes	Destruction of the Golden Horde

Belligerents
Moldavia; Crimean Khanate	Great Horde

Commanders and leaders
Stephen III; Meñli I Giray	Sheikh Ahmed

Strength
Unknown	Unknown

Casualties and losses
Unknown	Most of the army destroyed

The Battle of the Samara River took place in June 1502, during an attempted invasion of southern Moldavia by the Great Horde. It took place between the Moldavian–Crimean army of Stephen the Great and Meñli I Giray against the forces of Sheikh Ahmed, resulting in Moldavian–Crimean victory that led to destruction of the Golden Horde.

== Prelude ==
In 1502, Ottoman Sultan Bayezid II wanted to bring the Principality of Moldavia under full control. The Sultan wanted to avoid direct conflict and instead requested for Khan Sheikh Ahmed to attack and occupy southern Moldavia. Khan Ahmed agreed to attack, in exchange for a promise of Ottoman military support of 40,000 troops. Bayezid II believed that "we ourselves would be able to advance unhindered to all parts of the world" if the Tatars of Great Horde defeated Moldavians.

Khan Sheikh Ahmed dispatched the armies led by his sons Bagatır-saltan, Hoziak-saltan and Enai-saltan against the Crimean Khanate and to southern Russia. For this reason, Stephen III negotiated with Crimean Khan Meñli I Giray to coordinate their defense, in the case of Great Horde Tatars trying to cross the Dnieper.

== Battle ==
In April-May, Crimean Khan Meñli I Giray was on a campaign against the sons of Sheikh Ahmed, while Stephen III was on the right-bank of the Desna river with his army. The Golden Horde forces of Sheikh Ahmed arrived on the opposite side of Desna river. Between 3-17 May, Muscovite envoys informed Meñli I Giray with his army about this and the Moldavians were ready to strike the Golden Horde once the Crimeans arrived, attacking from the opposite side. The Muscovite army drove out Nogai forces of Musa, but didn't come to the assistance of the Crimeans or Moldavians, as promised by Muscovite envoys on 3 March.

The battle began in early June, as the Crimean Tatars were pursuing Sheikh Ahmed's sons to the same place as Stephen III and Sheikh Ahmed were located. The battle concluded on 28 June, leading to encirclement and destruction of the majority of the Golden Horde army, with Khan Ahmed managing to flee with only 4,000 horsemen and two of his brothers.

== Aftermath ==
On 10 June 1502, Crimean Khan Meñli I Giray sacked the capital of the Great Horde, Sarai. The defeat of the Golden Horde at Samara had proven to be catastrophic to its continued existence, marking the final blow.

In 1504, Sheikh Ahmed went to the Dnieper and attempted to contact Ottoman Sultan Bayezid II, but he was sent back by the Sultan. Meñli I Giray pursued Sheik Ahmed, which prompted him to surrender to the voivode of Kiev in hopes of escaping Crimean Tatars. However, Ahmed was subsequently executed by the Lithuanian authorities, at the request of Crimean Khan Meñli I Giray.
