= Battle of Suceava (1595) =

1595 battle in Romania

- Part of Jan Zamoyski's expedition to Moldavia; Moldavian Magnate Wars
Date	12 December 1595
Location	Suceava, in modern Romania
Result	Polish–Lithuanian victory

Belligerents
Polish–Lithuanian Commonwealth; Moldavia	Principality of Transylvania; Ottoman Empire

Commanders and leaders
Jan Potocki; Ieremia Movilă	Ştefan Răzvan (executed); Sinan Pasha

Strength
2,500	5,000

Casualties and losses
unknown	unknown

The Battle of Suceava was fought during the Moldavian Magnate Wars between the Polish–Lithuanian Commonwealth, supported by Moldavian forces, and the Principality of Transylvania, supported by Ottoman forces. It took place on 12 December 1595. Polish-Lithuanian forces under the command of Jan Potocki defeated the Transylvanian forces commanded by Ştefan Răzvan.

== Battle ==
On 12 December, Răzvan's army skirmished with a twice smaller Polish force near Suceava. Commander Jan Potocki tried unsuccessfully to resolve the conflict with Răzvan. However, Răzvan was not eager to negotiate, so Potocki gave him the battle. Răzvan's forces spread out on a mountain sheltered by palisades, while the Poles took up a position in the valley opposite. The Poles opened the battle with artillery fire, killing one of the commanders of Răzvan's forces in the process. The shelling was followed by a counterattack by the Transylvanian cavalry, which was smashed by Potocki, the Poles broke into Răzvan's camp, who defended himself bravely although he had to give way and retreat with the remnants of his troops. Răzvan, however, did not escape far and was quickly caught, Jeremi Moghila showed him no mercy and after long torture ordered him to be impaled.
