= Jan Karnkowski =

Polish noble, soldier, and administrator

Jan Karnkowski (1428-1503) of Junosza coat of arms was a Polish noble, soldier and administrator. He was the Hetman of hired soldiers in Poland-Lithuania, general starost of Głogów, standard bearer of Bydgoszcz (1486-1497), castellan of Gniezno and mayor of Kraków.
