= Polish–Ottoman Wars =

Polish–Ottoman Wars can refer to one of the several conflicts between the Polish–Lithuanian Commonwealth and the Ottoman Empire:

- Crusade of Varna (1443–1444)
- Polish–Ottoman War (1485–1503)
  - Jan Olbracht's Moldavian expedition of 1497 and Ottoman's retribution raid a year later
- Moldavian Magnate Wars, a period of near constant warfare at the end of the 16th century and the beginning of the 17th century.
  - Jan Zamoyski's expedition to Moldavia
- Polish–Ottoman War (1620–21)
- Polish–Ottoman War (1633–34)
- Polish–Cossack–Tatar War (1666–71)
- Polish–Ottoman War (1672–76)
- As part of the Great Turkish War:
  - Polish–Ottoman War (1683–99)

== See also ==
- Cossack raids – Reprisals for the Crimean–Nogai slave raids (1492–1774)
- List of wars involving Poland
- List of armed conflicts involving Poland against Turkey
- Crimean–Nogai slave raids in Eastern Europe – Ottoman-backed Turkic invasions (1441–1774)
- Polish–Ottoman alliance
- Polish–Russian Wars
- Polish–Swedish wars
- Polish–Teutonic War – Military conflicts
