= Lipnic =

- Commune
- Location within Moldova
- Coordinates: 48.3936111111°N 27.5125°E
- Country: Moldova
- District: Ocnița

Government
  - Mayor: Veaceslav Juraveli (PDCM)

Population (2024)
  - Total: 2,077
- Time zone: UTC+2 (EET)
  - Summer (DST): UTC+3 (EEST)

Lipnic is a commune in Ocnița District, Moldova. It is composed of two villages, Lipnic and Paustova.

The Battle of Lipnic occurred here on 20 August 1470, where the Moldavian military, led by Stephen the Great, defeated the armies of the Crimean Khanate led by Ahmed Khan. After the battle, the Khan's son and his brother Eminec were captured and taken prisoners.

== Natives ==
- Naum Corcescu (1922 – 1989), Romanian sculptor
