= Stephen the Great's expedition to Pokuttia =

1490 Moldavian invasion of Poland

Stephen the Great’s expedition to Pokuttia
- Part of the Moldavian–Polish Wars
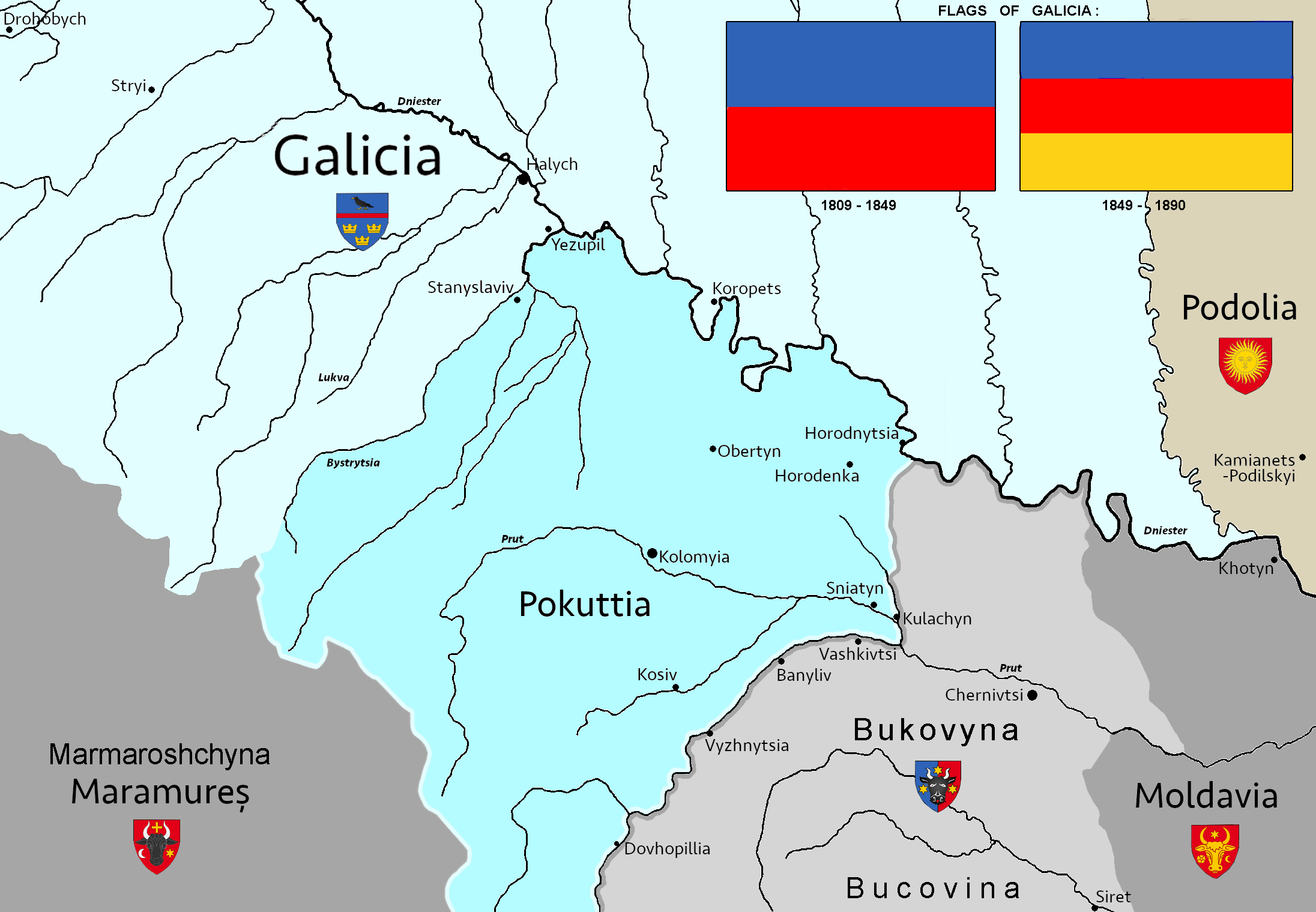
- Map of historical Pokuttia, based on Ion Nistor's Die moldauischen Ansprüche auf Pokutien, Vienna 1910
Date	Summer 1490
Location	Pokuttia, Kingdom of Poland
Result	Moldavian victory
Territorial changes	Moldavia occupies Pokuttia

Belligerents
Moldavia	Kingdom of Poland

Commanders and leaders
Stephen III	Casimir IV

Stephen the Great's expedition to Pokuttia, also known as the Moldavian campaign in Pokuttia, took place in the summer of 1490, and was motivated by the Moldavian Voivode Stephen the Great's desire to seize the Polish region of Pokuttia. The expedition resulted in Moldavian victory and the successful occupation of the region.

== Prelude ==
Since the late 14th century, the Principality of Moldavia and Kingdom of Poland both claimed the region of Pokuttia as a part of their territory. Stephen the Great also viewed Pokuttia as an integral part of Moldavia, combined with his grievances against the Polish King Casimir IV, which he believed had failed to provide sufficient support against the Ottoman Empire. Stephen intended to commence several "wars of revenge" against Poland, culminating in his expedition to Pokuttia in the summer of 1490.

== Expedition ==
In 1489, the Kingdom of Poland was invaded by the Crimean Tatars and Kiev was sacked, significantly weakening the Polish state. On 15 March 1490, Stephen was likely informed of this event, which motivated him to exploit the moment of Polish confusion.

Stephen and his army then invaded Pokuttia, facing minimal resistance and shocking the Polish King Casimir IV with his sudden actions. In August, the Moldavian army captured Kołomyja and Halicz. The Polish army at this time was incapable of repelling the Moldavian invaders, since their main forces were busy dealing with Tatar raids and a peasant uprising. On 16 September, John I Albert managed to gather the Polish forces at Bóbrka in order to repel the Moldavians. However, he had to overturn his forces at the news of an Ottoman army heading to assist Moldavians.

== Aftermath ==
The expedition resulted in the successful occupation of Pokuttia by the Principality of Moldavia. Until the death of Casimir IV, on 7 June 1492, the Kingdom of Poland didn't attempt to recapture Pokuttia. However, after John I Albert was crowned as the new Polish King, he "could not endure this humiliation and such significant damage for long", which led to the Moldavian campaign of 1497, initially disguised as support for Stephen the Great against the Ottoman Empire in retaking Chilia and Cetatea Albă.
