= Sheikh Ahmed =

Last khan of the Great Horde (r. 1481–1502)

Khan of the Great Horde
- Reign: 1481 – 28 June 1502
- Predecessor: Ahmed Khan bin Küchük
- Successor: Monarchy abolished
- Died: c. 1529
- Dynasty: Borjigin
- Father: Ahmed Khan bin Küchük
- Religion: Sunni Islam

Sheikh Ahmed (Turki and Persian شیخ احمد; died 1529) was the last khan of the Great Horde, a remnant of the Golden Horde, reigning from 1481 to 1502.

== Reign ==
He was one of the three sons of Ahmed Khan bin Küchük, the man who lost Russia in 1480. After the assassination of Ahmed Khan in 1481, his sons feuded for power and it only further weakened the Horde. The Horde, then allied with the Grand Duchy of Lithuania, was fighting with the Crimean Khanate, allied with the Grand Principality of Moscow.

In 1500, the Muscovite–Lithuanian War resumed. Lithuania once again allied with the Great Horde. In 1501, Khan Sheikh Ahmed attacked Muscovite forces near Rylsk, Novgorod-Seversk, and Starodub. According to the accounts of the Bychowiec Chronicle, Sheikh Ahmed gave the rule of these occupied cities to the Lithuanian diplomat of Ruthenian origin, Michał Chalecki. These territories were held by the Grand Duchy of Lithuania prior to the war of 1500-1503. Sheikh Ahmed would spend the following winter of 1501–1502 camping between Kiev and Chernigov.

Lithuanian grand duke Alexander Jagiellon was preoccupied with his succession in the Kingdom of Poland and did not participate in the campaign, failing to provide necessary support. A harsh winter combined with burning of the steppe by Meñli I Giray, Khan of the Crimean Khanate, resulted in famine among Sheikh Ahmed's forces. Many of his men deserted him and the remainder was defeated on the Sula River on 10 June 1502. His last stand took place at the Battle of Samara River, where his army was crushed by Moldavians and Crimean Tatars on 28 June, forcing Ahmed to flee with his remaining 4,000 horsemen.

Sheikh Ahmed was forced into exile. He sought refuge at the Ottoman Empire, the Nogai Horde, or an alliance with the Grand Principality of Moscow, before turning to the Grand Duchy of Lithuania. Instead of helping its former ally, the Grand Duchy imprisoned Sheikh Ahmed. He was arrested in Kiev in late 1503 or early 1504. Sheikh Ahmed was used as a bargaining chip in negotiations with the Crimean Khanate: if the Khanate did not behave, Sheikh Ahmed would be released and would resume his war with the Khanate. Meñli I Giray became a reluctant ally of Lithuania. Sheikh Ahmed was held in Vilnius Upper Castle, Trakai and moved to Kaunas Castle after an escape attempt.

After the Battle of Olshanitsa on 27 January 1527, Sheikh Ahmed was released from prison. It is said that he managed to seize power in the Astrakhan Khanate. He died around 1529.

== Genealogy ==
- Genghis Khan
- Jochi
- Orda Khan
- Sartaqtay
- Köchü
- Bayan
- Sasibuqa
- Ilbasan
- Chimtay
- Urus
- Temur-Malik
- Temür Qutlugh
- Temur ibn Temur Qutlugh
- Küchük Muhammad
- Ahmed Khan bin Küchük
- Sheikh Ahmed

== Bibliography ==
- Howorth, Henry Hoyle (1880). History of the Mongols from the 9th to the 19th Century. Vol. 2. Longmans, Green, and Co. OCLC 49793717.
- Kolodziejczyk, Dariusz (2011). The Crimean Khanate and Poland-Lithuania: International Diplomacy on the European Periphery (15th-18th Century). A Study of Peace Treaties Followed by Annotated Documents. The Ottoman Empire and its Heritage. BRILL. ISBN 9789004191907.

Sheikh Ahmed House of Borjigin
Regnal titles
Preceded by Ahmed Khan bin Küchük	Khan of the Great Horde; 1481–1502	Succeeded by None
