= Jan Zamoyski's expedition to Moldavia =

- Part of Moldavian Magnate Wars; Polish–Ottoman Wars
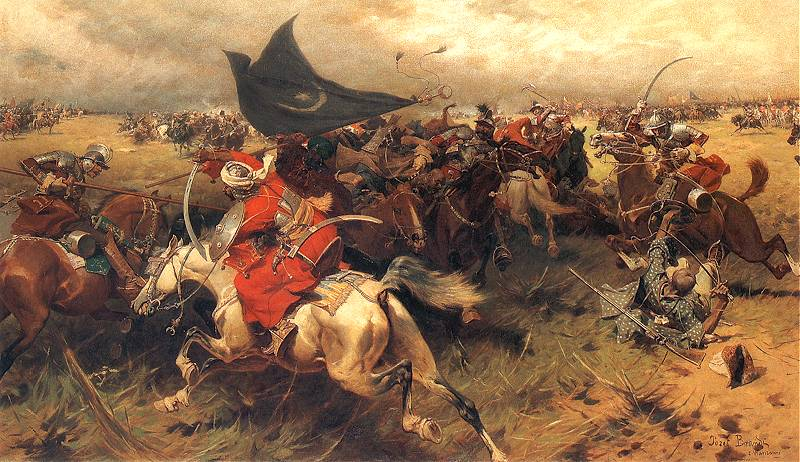
- "Struggle for the Turkish banner" by Józef Brandt.
Date	1595
Location	Iași and Țuțora, Moldavia
Result	Polish–Lithuanian victory
Territorial changes	Moldavia becomes a Polish vassal state

Belligerents
Polish–Lithuanian Commonwealth; Moldavia (pro-Polish faction)	Ottoman Empire; Crimean Khanate; Moldavia (pro-Ottoman faction)

Commanders and leaders
Jan Zamoyski; Ieremia Movilă	Mehmed III; Gazi II Girej; Ștefan Răzvan (executed)

Strength
7,300	25,000

Jan Zamoyski's expedition to Moldavia was a successful military campaign in 1595 that aimed to establish Moldavia as a Polish vassal state.

== Background ==
In early 1595 Sigismund Báthory, Prince of Transylvania, convinced Ștefan Răzvan, a commander of Hungarian mercenaries in the service of the Hospodar Aaron the Tyrant to rebel. Ștefan captured Aaron and sent him to Transylvania, then proclaimed himself as the new Hospodar and a vassal of Sigismund. In response the Ottoman Sultan Mehmed III, who had been Aaron's protector and sovereign, decided to put an end to the ongoing power struggles in Moldavia, Wallachia, and Transylvania between various magnates. While Wallachia was to receive a new Turkish sponsored ruler, Moldavia was to be simply incorporated into the Ottoman Empire as a province. The Ottoman intervention aroused alarms in the Polish–Lithuanian Commonwealth which sought to reestablish its influence in the region, having lost sovereignty over Moldavia some hundred years earlier after the Battle of the Cosmin Forest.

== Battle of Cecora ==
In the summer of 1595, a Polish army of 5,000 cavalry and 2,300 infantry entered Moldavia, occupied Khotyn on August 27 and the capital Iași on September 3, where Zamoyski installed Ieremia Movilă as the new hospodar who pursued a policy favorable to Poland.The Ottoman Sultan, not idle, sent against Zamoyski an army consisting mainly of Tartars and regular Ottoman troops in a strength of about 25,000. Zamoyski, upon hearing of the approaching enemy, fortified himself between the river Prut. The Tatar-Ottoman army arrived on September 18, and several skirmishes took place on the same day. The main clash occurred on September 19 when the Tatars unsuccessfully tried several times to break into the Polish camp, on September 20 the Tatar Khan Gazi, unable to gain victory over the Polish camp, entered negotiations. On September 21, a peace treaty was signed in which the Tatars recognized Ieremia Movilă as hospodar and agreed to station Polish troops in Moldavia. On September 23, the Tatars proceeded to retreat.

== Moldavia as Polish-Ottoman condominium ==
After the victory of the Polish army at Cecora and the recognition of Ieremia Movilă as hospodar, Moldavia became a de facto Polish-Ottoman condominium, paying tribute to the Ottomans while at the same time being a vassal state of the Polish-Lithuanian Commonwealth. However, this did not please the previous hospodar Ștefan Răzvan, who, aided by the Turks at the head of an army of 5,000, entered Moldavia to overthrow Ieremia Movilă.

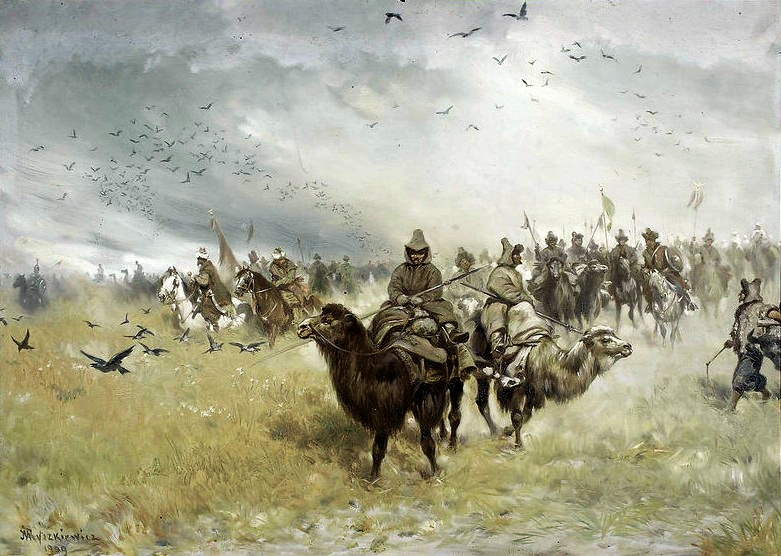
Tatars in the vanguard

== Battle of Suceava ==
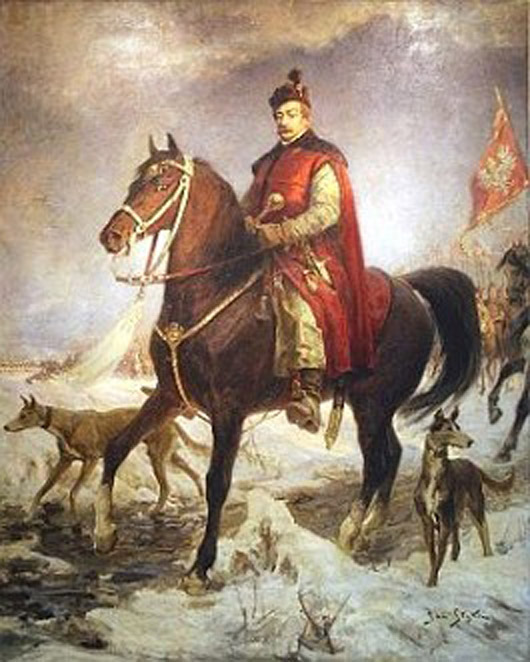
Hetman Jan Zamoyski

On December 12, Răzvan's army skirmished with a twice smaller Polish force near Suceava. Commander Jan Potocki tried unsuccessfully to resolve the conflict with Răzvan. However, Răzvan was not eager to negotiate, so Potocki gave him the battle. Răzvan's forces spread out on a mountain sheltered by palisades, while the Poles took up a position in the valley opposite. The Poles opened the battle with artillery fire, killing one of the commanders of Răzvan's forces in the process. The shelling was followed by a counterattack by the Transylvanian cavalry, which was smashed by Potocki, the Poles broke into Răzvan's camp, who defended himself bravely although he had to give way and retreat with the remnants of his troops. Răzvan, however, did not escape far and was quickly caught, Jeremi Moghila showed him no mercy and after long torture ordered him to be impaled.

== Aftermath ==
In 1597, the treaty of Polish-Ottoman friendship was renewed recognizing the election of hospodars by Polish kings, but Moldavians still had to pay tribute to the Sultan. The following year, the Porta obliged the Crimean Khan not to violate Polish borders and even to provide military assistance at the king's call.

Moldavia would cease to be a Polish vassal after the 1620–1621 Polish–Ottoman War.

== See also ==
- Polish-Ottoman Wars
- Moldavian Magnate Wars
- Battle of Cecora
- Battle of Suceava
- Jan Zamoyski
