= Moldavian–Polish War (1502–1510) =

- Part of Moldavian–Polish War; Polish–Ottoman Wars
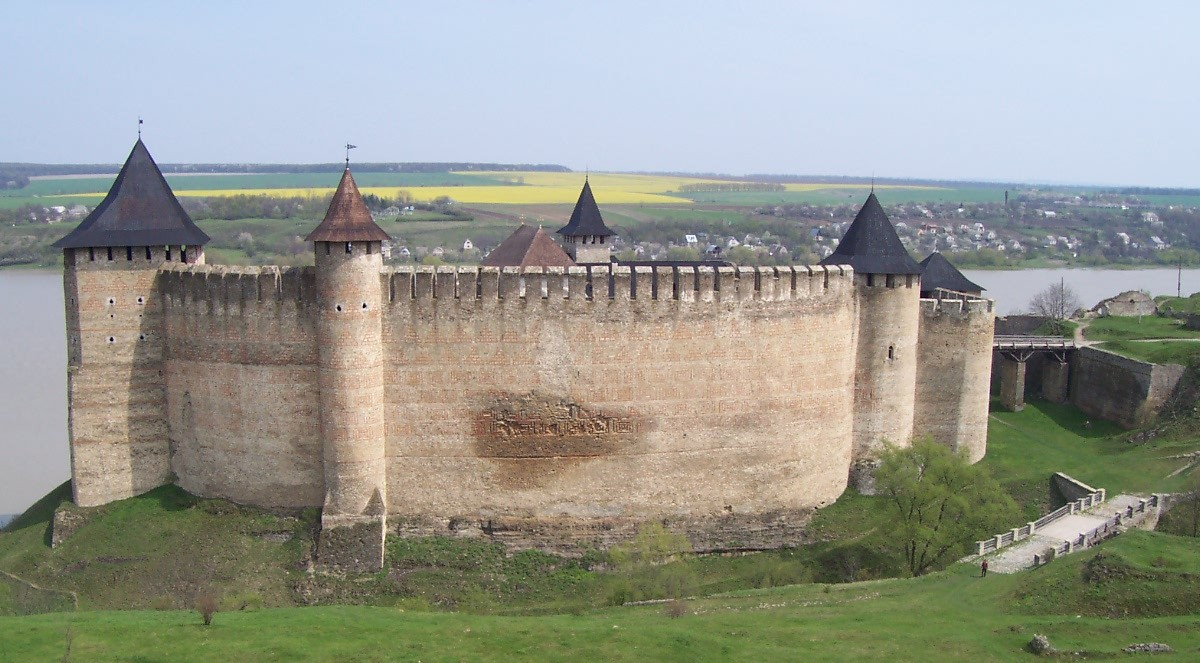
- The Khotyn Fortress
Date	1502 – 22 January 1510
Location	Pokuttia, Moldavia, Kingdom of Poland
Result	Polish victory

Belligerents
Kingdom of Poland	Moldavia; Ottoman Empire

Commanders and leaders
Alexander Jagiellon; Mikołaj Kamieniecki	Stephen III # Bogdan III; Copaciu

Strength
1509: 20,000	Unknown

The Moldavian–Polish War of 1502–1510 was a conflict between the Kingdom of Poland and Moldavia and the Ottoman Empire supporting it. The war ended with a Polish victory under the Treaty of Kamieniec Podolski on January 22, 1510, in which Bogdan III the One-Eyed relinquished his claim to Pokuttia and his marriage plans to Elizabeth Jagiellon, and returned the marriage contract.

== War ==
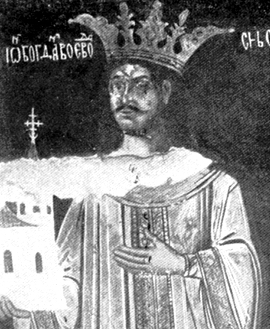
Bogdan III the One-Eyed

The war was started by Stephen the Great in September 1502, who took advantage of internal unrest in the Kingdom of Poland, the Tatar invasion and the siege of Smolensk by Muscovite's army, to seize Polish Pokuttia once again, in which he was aided by the Orthodox population and part of the Ruthenian nobility. In 1504, after the hospodar's death, his son Bogdan III the One-Eyed ascended the Moldavian throne. He proposed to marry Elisabeth, the sister of King Alexander Jagiellon, and deceived by false promises from the Polish envoy, Grand Marshal of the Crown Stanislaw Chodecki, withdrew from Pokuttia in September 1505. A year later, having learned of the death of the Polish king and his disagreement with the marriage, Bogdan again occupied Pokuttia and invaded Podolia. This time, Mikolaj Kamieniecki, at the head of 3,000 soldiers, entered Pokuttia, drove out the enemy armies and invaded Moldavia, and after defeating a few thousand Moldavians, returned to Poland. Another Moldavian invasion took place in June 1509 on Red Ruthenia and Podolia, and on the way back Moldavians occupied Pokuttia again. The Poles, having gathered 20,000 troops (Levée en masse, defense troops, enlisted troops) under the command of Hetman Kamieniecki, recaptured Pokuttia and entered Moldavia with the intention of seizing its capital Suceava. After a three-week unsuccessful siege, they began a retreat, bypassing Bukovina from the east. While crossing the Dniester near Khotyn, the Moldavians led by Copaciu decided to engage in a battle.

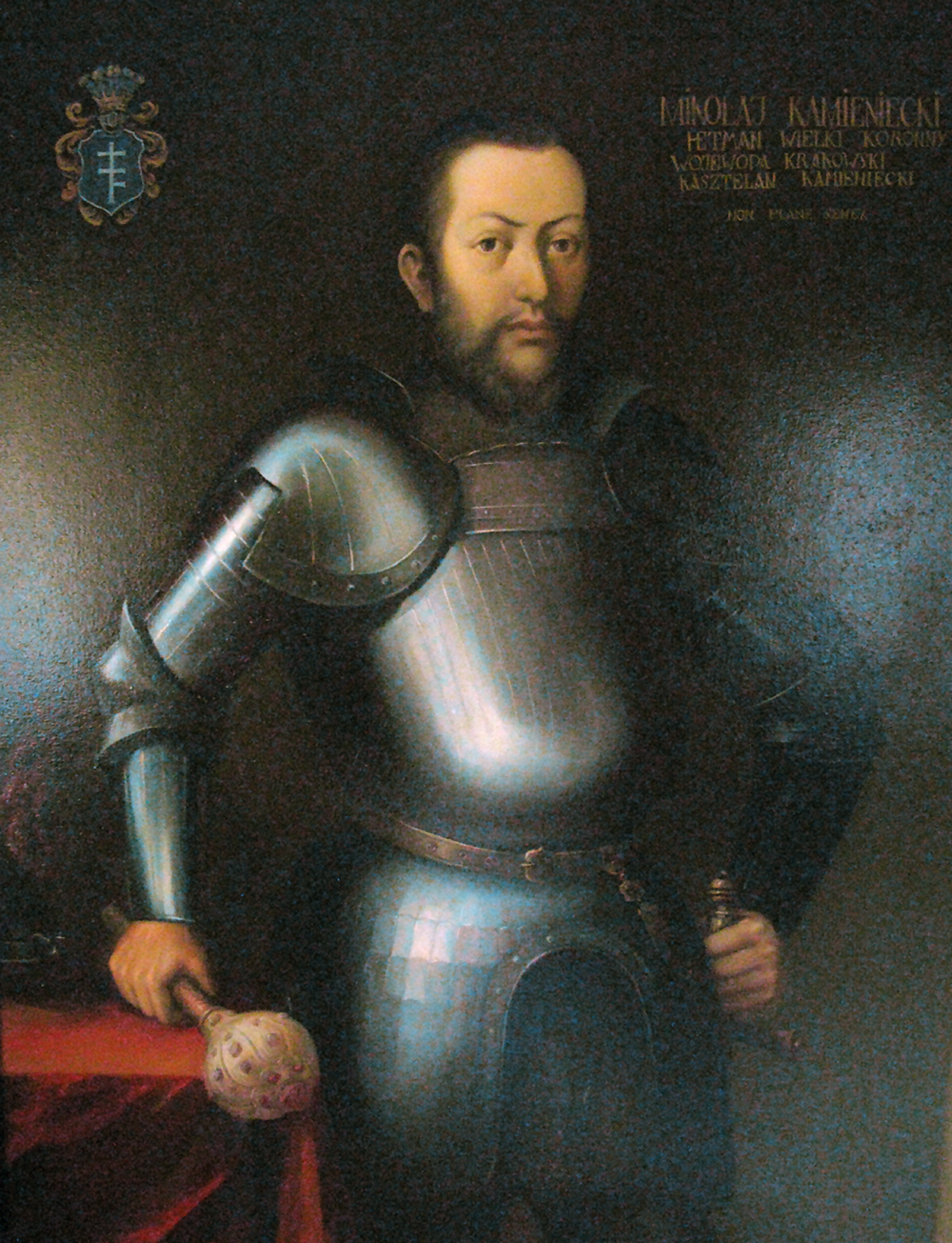
Hetman Mikołaj Kamieniecki

== Battle of Khotyn (1509) ==
When part of the Levée en masse crossed the river, enlisted troops began to prepare for the crossing. At this point, the Moldavian army attacked with the support of Ottoman troops. The attack was conducted from the northwest, from the side of the Khotyn Fortress, down a steep slope. Despite this, the attacked Poles did not succumb to panic and quickly set up for battle. During the battle, the Polish mounted cavalry disengaged imperceptibly, went around the hill from which the Moldavians were attacking from the west and hit them from behind. This caused a retreat of their troops, turned into a flight. During the chase, many of the hospodar's dignitaries were taken prisoner. Fifty of them were beheaded.

== Aftermath ==
On January 22, 1510, a peace treaty was signed in Kamieniec Podolski, in which Bogdan definitively relinquished his claim to Pokuttia and his marriage plans with Elizabeth Jagiellon, and returned the marriage contract.

== See also ==
- Moldavian Magnate Wars
- Polish-Ottoman Wars
- Bogdan III the One-Eyed
- Mikołaj Kamieniecki
