= Battle of Codrii Plonini =

1368 battle between Moldavia and Poland

Date	July 1368
Location	Țara Șipenițului, Moldavia
Result	Moldavian victory

Belligerents
Moldavia	Kingdom of Poland; Moldavian opposition

Commanders and leaders
Peter I	Casimir III; Otto de Pilcza (POW); Z. Oleśnicki (POW); N. Tęczynski (POW); Stephen I

Strength
Unknown	Unknown

Casualties and losses
Unknown	Entire army annihilated

The Battle of Codrii Plonini took place in July 1368, between the Principality of Moldavia of Peter I and Kingdom of Poland of Casimir III the Great, who was supported by Moldavian defector Stephen I (son of Bogdan the Founder). It was the first recorded conflict between Moldavia and Poland, resulting in Moldavian victory.

== Prelude ==
From 1366, Kingdom of Poland expended its territories during the Galicia–Volhynia Wars, annexing western Volhynia. Poland reached eastern Volhynia and Podolia, which were located at the Moldavian border. During this period, a power struggle took place between the sons of Bogdan the Founder. with Peter I expelling Stephen I from Moldavia. This led to Stephen I asking the Polish King Casimir III for support in retaking power in exchange for vassalage, an offer that the Polish King accepted and sent out an army to assist Stephen I in retaking his throne.

== Battle ==
The description of the battle comes from Jan Długosz and Filippo Buonaccorsi. It took place at Țara Șipenițului, between Sniatyn and Chernivtsi. The battle begun as soon as the Polish army alongside Stephen I crossed the border, with main confrontation taking place at Codrii Plonini.

The Moldavians avoided a direct confrontation, using hit-and-run attacks instead, leading the Polish troops into ambushes where the Moldavian troops knocked down trees on them. Independent battles also took place, with many of Stephen I's troops defecting to Peter I. The battle ultimately led to the defeat of the Polish army, with survivors taken captive.

== Aftermath ==
The battle resulted in Moldavian victory and a disastrous defeat for the Polish army. In this battle, Polish commanders Otto de Pilcza, Zbigniew Oleśnicki and Nawoj Tęczynski were captured. Many of the pro-Polish Moldavian troops of Stephen I defected. However, Peter I ultimately managed to reach an agreement with his brother, granting him an administrative roles within Moldavia.

The Moldavian victory in this battle was a source of pride, since Moldavia had not previously faced such a large invading army. Historian Ștefan S. Gorovei characterized the victory in this battle in the following way: "a keystone, a pillar around which the genealogy and chronology of the first Moldavian voivodes of the fourteenth century are built".
