= Moldavian campaign of Dmytro Vyshnevetsky =

1563 Cossack–Polish expedition to Moldavia

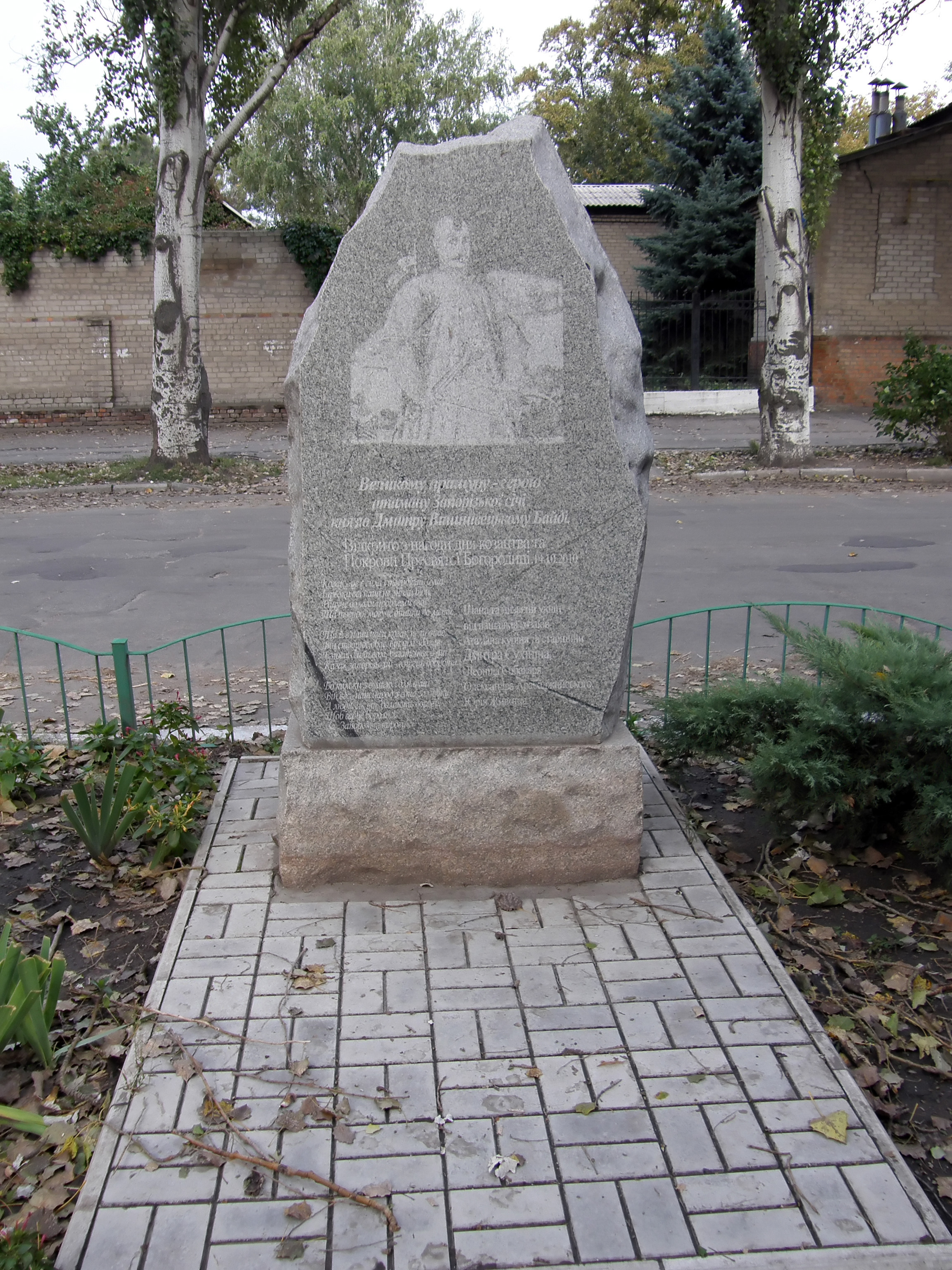
- Monument to Dymitr Wiśniowiecki in Zaporizhia, Ukraine
Date	August 1563
Location	Moldavia (Note: Main battle took place at Siret river near Suceava)
Result	Moldavian victory

Belligerents
Moldavia; Ottoman Empire	Zaporozhian Cossacks; Kingdom of Poland

Commanders and leaders
Ștefan Tomșa	Dmytro Vyshnevetsky (POW); Jan Piasecki (POW); Albrecht Łaski (AWOL) (Note: Łaski and his unit abandoned Vyshnevetsky and retreated from Moldavia.)

Strength
Unknown; more than Cossacks and Poles	500–5,000

Casualties and losses
Heavy/light	Most of the army killed or captured

The Moldavian campaign of Dmytro Vyshnevetsky (Note: Ukrainian: Похід Вишневецького на Молдову Polish: Wyprawa Wiśniowieckiego na Mołdawię) was a military expedition carried out by the Cossacks of Dmytro Vyshnevetsky jointly with the Polish forces of Albrecht Łaski as a part of an ongoing internal conflict in Moldavia. There was a 500 to 5,000-strong Cossack-Polish detachment of Dmytro Vyshnevetsky that invaded Moldavia, but was defeated by an Moldavian army led by Ștefan Tomșa I, with Vyshnevetsky and Jan Piasecki taken captive. The expedition took place at the same time as the Moldavian noble rebellion occurred.

== Background ==
In December 1562, Vyshnevetsky returned to the service of King Sigismund II Augustus and received back his possessions and positions, despite Vyshnevetsky previously being allied with Ivan the Terrible. At the Sejm in Lublin, Vyshnevetsky received a proposition from Albrecht Łąski, who was the voivode of Khotyn, to invade Moldavia. In 1563, Vyshnevetsky's army that consisted of, according to different estimates, from 500 to 5 thousand Cossacks and Poles stood up a camp on the Dniester while waiting reinforcements from Łąski. Meanwhile, an anti-Heraclid rebellion broke out in Moldavia, which led to Ștefan Tomșa I becoming a temporary ruler of the country. According to some sources, the campaign was initially supposed to help the rebels in their revolt.

== Campaign ==
In August 1563, a delegation of Moldavian boyars appeared in Vyshnevetsky's camp, asking him to capture Suceava as quick as possible. Cossack army then crossed the Prut and approached Suceava, while Łąski due to conflict with Vyshnevetsky returned to Poland. At Siret river they created a camp and were planning to attack Suceava when being ambushed by the Moldavian forces of Ștefan Tomșa I. Despite the numerial superiority of the Moldavian army, the Cossacks initially repelled Moldavian assaults and inflicted heavy losses on them. However once a reinforcements came to assist the Moldavian forces, the Cossacks were not being able to repel the assaults anymore and were defeated. Some of the Cossacks managed to escape, while Vyshnevetsky and Piasecki were captured and sent to the Ottomans.

== Aftermath ==
Following the unsuccessful campaign, Vyshnevetsky and Piasecki were sent to Istanbul in October 1563, where they were executed by the order from either Selim II or Suleiman the Magnificent. The political instability in Moldavia continued and in January 1564, Tomșa was overthrown by the supporters of Alexandru Lăpușneanu and fled to Poland, where he was captured by Jerzy Jazłowiecki and executed in March 1564.

== Bibliography ==
- Serhiychuk, Volodymyr (2003). Дмитро Вишневецький (PDF).
