= Moldavian–Polish War (1450) =

War between Poland and Moldavia in 1450

Date	January – September 1450
Location	Moldavia
Result	Moldavian victory

Belligerents
Kingdom of Poland; Moldavian opposition	Moldavia

Commanders and leaders
Casimir IV; Alexăndrel	Bogdan II; Stephen III

Strength
Unknown	Unknown

Casualties and losses
Nearly entire army	Light

The Moldavian–Polish War of 1450 or Moldavian Campaign of 1450 was an unsuccessful Polish invasion of Moldavia that sought to dethrone Moldavian Voivode Bogdan II and restore Polish control by installing the pro-Polish Alexăndrel. It took place from January to September 1450, culminating in the Battle of the Crasna river on 5–6 September, resulting in Moldavian victory.

== Prelude ==
From 1432 till c. 1462, Moldavia was going through a period of instability and power struggle that led to a civil war between numerous factions. For the Kingdom of Poland, this was beneficial as it allowed them to increase their influence over Moldavia by exploiting Moldavia's infighting. Polish lords decided to join John Hunyadi in his anti-Ottoman crusade in order to avenge Polish King Władysław III of Poland. Several thousand Polish troops, 3,000 Moldavian cavalrymen and 4,000 Wallachian troops were to take part in the campaign.

At the end of 1448, pro-Polish Alexăndrel took power in Moldavia. However, his power was undermined by Bogdan II, illegitimate son Alexander the Good. On late September 1449, he defeated Alexăndrel on 12 October, at Tămășani, north of Romania. This led to Alexăndrel fleeing to Poland and requesting military assistance in order to regain power.

== War ==
=== Initial invasion ===
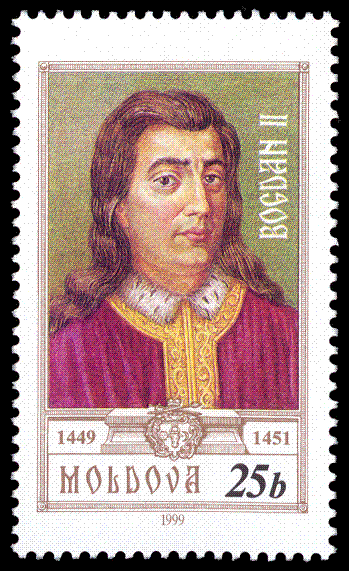
Moldovan postage stamp of Bogdan II

On January 1450, the Polish army invaded Moldavia. They captured Hotin, Suceava, Târgu Neamț and defeated a few smaller Moldavian units. Bogdan II entrenched in the southwest of the country, planning a counterattack. Bogdan II and his son Stephen III managed to gather Moldavian noble support, organising a large army, which managed to force the Polish army to fall back during late February and early March fighting. Alexăndrel was again defeated and forced to seek refuge in Podolia.

On 11 February, Bogdan II wrote a letter to John Hunyadi, requesting to become a vassal of the Kingdom of Hungary in exchange for shelter of his family and important nobles. On 5 July, Bogdan II requested military support as the Polish army planned a new offensive. The Polish forces were now better organised and intended to restore Alexăndrel to power. Bogdan II also organised a significant number of troops moved his army in the deep forests of the Vaslui region.

=== Battle of the Crasna river ===
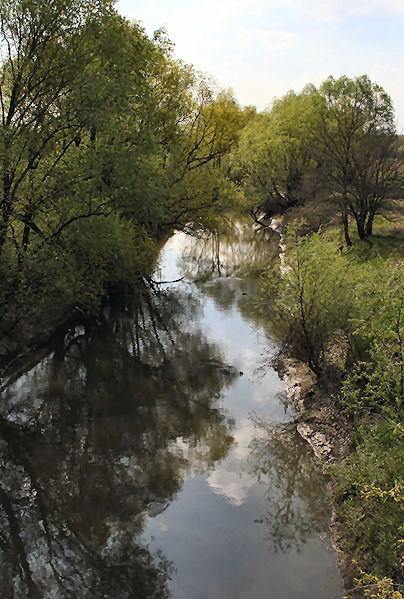
Crasna river

According to the Polish chronicles, Bogdan II intended to lure the Polish army into the Moldavian territory in order to inflict a crushing defeat on the Poles and prevent them from falling back to reorganise again. The Polish army marched into Moldavia throughout August. On 29 August, Moldavians requested peace talks that were accepted. As it turned out, the Moldavians used this time in order to assess the weaknesses and strengths of the Polish forces. On September 5, Bogdan II signed a peace treaty, according to which he was supposed to give up his power in 1453.

As the Polish army turned back, they reached the Crasna village while returning using the same route. Bogdan II then violated the peace treaty and tried to launch an ambush attack on the Polish army. However, the Poles were informed about this and organised a defense, although the defensive environment for it was poor. Polish forces were at first forced to fight dispersed Moldavian forces, before Bogdan II organised them for a single organised surprise attack that lead to heavy losses. Nonetheless, the Polish forces avoided complete destruction, managing to break out of encirclement and retreat out Moldavia to Poland.

== Aftermath ==
The war ended in a Moldavian victory. As a result, Moldavia was neither annexed to Poland, nor was Hospodar Bogdan removed from office. Moldavian losses were light, while the Polish army suffered near complete annihilation and was left demoralized. Casimir IV and Alexăndrel were unable to win the war, but managed to assassinate Bogdan II on 15 October 1451 and temporarily restore Alexăndrel's power in Moldavia. Bogdan II's son, Stephen III, took refuge in Translyvania under the protection of John Hunyadi. Stephen III would later organise a campaign to reclaim power in 1457.

== See also ==
- Moldavian Magnate Wars
- Moldavian Campaign (1497–1499)
- Moldavian–Polish War (1502–1510)
