= Battle of the Vodna River =

1473 battle between Moldavia and Wallachia

Battle of Vodna River
Date	18–20 November 1473
Location	Vodna river, Wallachia
Result	Moldavian victory
Territorial changes	Moldavian occupation of Bucharest

Belligerents
Moldavia	Wallachia

Commanders and leaders
Stephen III	Radu III

Strength
24,000	64,000

Casualties and losses
Unknown	Heavy

The Battle of the Vodna River took place on 18–20 November 1473, located 45km from Bucharest, during the Wallachian campaign of Moldavian Voivode Stephen the Great, who sought to undermine the Ottoman Influence over Wallachia and bring the principality under Moldavian influence. The battle resulted in Moldavian victory and subsequent retreat of Wallachian Voivode Radu III to Bucharest, which was captured by the Moldavian forces on 23 November.

== Prelude ==
In 1473, Stephen the Great took an openly anti-Ottoman position and sought to secure his principality from the Ottoman threat. Stephen intended to bring Wallachia under the Moldavian influence, in order to undermine Ottomans in the region. On 8 November, Stephen's advanced towards Milcov. After organising his army into 12 groups and leaving some behind as a reserve, he headed towards the Vodna river, where he was going to unexpectedly confront the Wallachian army of Radu III.

== Battle ==
The Moldavian army of Stephen the Great was made up of 12 groups, which consisted of 24,000 troops. On the other hand, Radu III's Wallachian army consisted of 64,000 troops. However, the strength of Wallachian forces was hindered by the fact that Radu sent 12,000 of his troops to aid Mehmed II in his battle with Uzun Hasan of Turkoman Aq Qoyunlu.

The Moldavians harassed Wallachians for ten days prior to the battle. The Wallachian forces had only two days to organise. According to Moldovan-German chronicle, the Wallachians underestimated Moldavians: "then all the bands joined together at night, so that neither the voivode Radu nor his army knew anything about them and believed nothing other than that they were as few as they had seen themselves".

The fighting begun on 18 November at sunrise on the Vodna river, which was located 45km from Bucharest. The battle lasted for three days, which led to the crushing defeat of Wallachian army and retreat of Radu III to Dâmbovița fortress in Bucharest on 21 November.

== Aftermath ==
The Battle of Vodna river ended in Moldavian victory. Radu III fled to Bucharest, which was besieged by the Moldavian forces and captured on 23 November. Radu didn't attempt to muster a strong resistance and managed to slip through the Moldavian siege, taking refuge in the Ottoman fortress of Giurgiu. On 24 November, the Moldavians occupied Bucharest and installed Basarab III as a new Wallachian Voivode.
