= Battle of Sochi =

1471 battle between Moldavia and Wallachia

- Part of the Moldavian–Ottoman Wars
Date	7 March 1471
Location	Sochi, near Râmnicu Sărat, Wallachia
Result	Moldavian victory

Belligerents
Moldavia	Wallachia; Ottoman Empire

Commanders and leaders
Stephen III	Radu III; Mircea Comis (POW); Stan Logofăt (POW)

Strength
Unknown	Unknown

Casualties and losses
Unknown	Very heavy
- 17,000 Romani enslaved by Moldavians

The Battle of Sochi took place on 7 March 1471, between the Moldavian army of Voivode Stephen the Great against the Wallachian army of Radu III supported by the Ottoman Empire, resulting in Moldavian victory and disastrous rout of the Wallachian–Ottoman forces.

== Prelude ==
After Moldavia repelled the Hungarian invasion in 1467, Stephen the Great invaded Wallachia in 1471. Stephen stopped paying tribute to the Ottoman Empire and begun his attempts to get Wallachia out of Ottoman control. The exact location where the confrontation was going to take place is uncertain, either Moldavia or Wallachia, with commonly-accepted location among historians being Râmnicu Sărat in Wallachia.

== Battle ==
In early March 1471, Radu III led his army towards Sochi, likely near Râmnicu Sărat in Wallachia, where he intended to confront the Moldavia army of Stephen the Great. Stephen invaded on 7 March, starting "war with the voivode Radu at Sochi" per Slavo-Moldavian Chronicles.

The confrontation was intense, but Moldavians "killed a large crowd of them Wallachians. And all the banners were taken away, and the great banner of Radu the voivode was taken. And many brave men were caught then, who were also cut off ... ".

== Aftermath ==
The battle resulted in Moldavian victory and led to heavy losses among Wallachians, including capture of two Wallachian boyars, Mircea Comis and Stan Logofăt. Moldavians also took loot and 17,000 Romani slaves with them.

Radu III attempted to be more careful in his next confrontation with Moldavians by building Crăciuna Fortress. For Stephen the Great, this battle marked his first step in wresting Wallachia from the Ottoman influence.
