= Battle of Râmnic =

1481 battle between Moldavia and Wallachia

- Part of the Moldavian-Ottoman Wars
Date	8 July 1481
Location	Râmnicu Sărat, Wallachia
Result	Moldavian victory

Belligerents
Moldavia	Wallachia; Ottoman Empire

Commanders and leaders
Stephen III	Basarab IV

Strength
Unknown	20,000 (Ottoman Empire) Unknown

Casualties and losses
Significant	Entire army annihilated

The Battle of Râmnic took place during the invasion of Wallachia by Moldavian Voivode Stephen the Great against the Wallachian army of Basarab IV supported by the Ottoman Empire. It took place on 8 July 1481, resulting in Moldavian victory.

== Prelude ==
On 2/3 May 1481, Ottoman Sultan Mehmed II died. This led to a power struggle among the Ottoman leadership, including his son Bayezid II that sought to consolidate take power. In a meanwhile, Wallachian ruler Basarab IV with support of Ottoman pashas Ali-Beg and Skender-Beg invaded Moldavia, plundering lands up to Lunca Mare. Stephen seized his opportunity to respond to this attack and invade Wallachia.

== Battle ==
Stephen pursued the Wallachian-Ottoman army up to Râmnicu Sărat on 8 July 1481. He previously invaded Wallachia in 1472, with his main obstacle being Râmnicu Sărat. This turned out to be the case again in 1481, but this time Stephen intended to attack without Translyvanian support.

The battle was fierce and difficult for both sides, with two of Stephen boyars, Şendrea and brother-in-law Costea falling in battle. However, the Bistrița chronicle stated the following about difficult Moldavian victory:

And he conquered again [Ștefan voivode] - and a great and innumerable crowd of people was completely defeated and all their banners were taken and not one of them remained and all the brave men and boyars fell then; and they will remember that fight and that death until the end of the world.

== Aftermath ==
Wallachian ruler Basarab IV fled after his defeat on the battlefield. Moldavian forces pursued his Ottoman allies and harassed them. Stephen moved further into Wallachia and drove Basarab's forces beyond Danube. Stephen installed Vlad Călugărul to power, who was a half-brother of Vlad the Impaler. However, his regin would prove to be temporary, as he would get assassinated on 16 November, with Wallachia returning under the Ottoman influence. On 10 March 1482, Stephen would change his strategy to establishing defense in captured Wallachian lands around Moldavia instead of trying to change power in Wallachia itself.

== Legacy ==
Stephen the Great commemorated his victory at monastery in Milișăuți, near Suceava in 1487: "John Stephen voivode, by the grace of God prince of the Moldovan lands, son of Bogdan voivode, together with his beloved son Alexander, made war at Râmnic with Basarab voivode ...".
