= Battle of Orbic =

1457 battle in the Balkans

Coordinates: 46.7555°N 26.6877°E

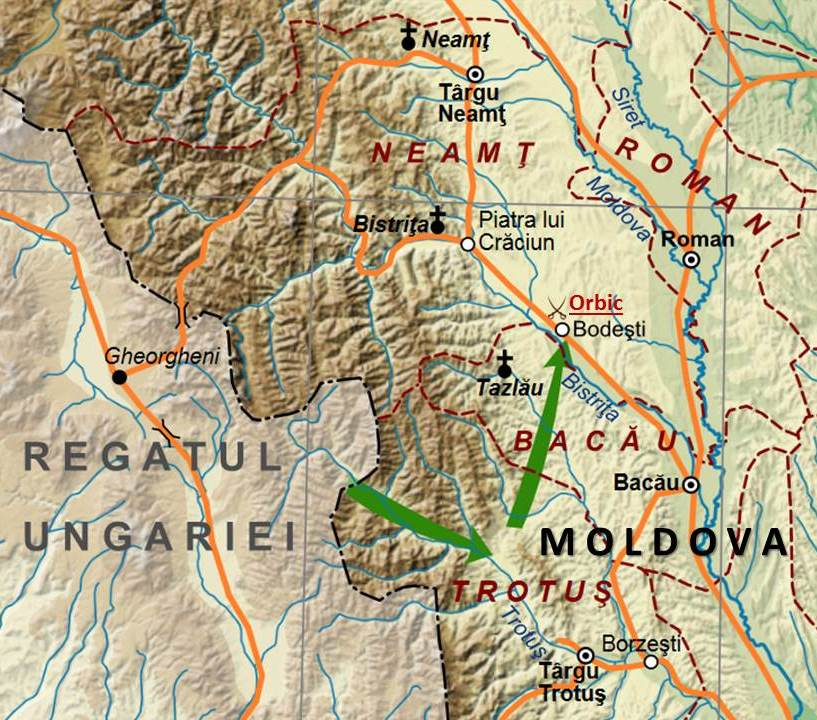
| Date | 1457 |
| Location | Orbic (today, a district of Buhuși) |

The Battle of Orbic was a battle between the armies led by Stephen the Great and Petru Aron that took place in Orbic (today, a district of Buhuși).

It was the second armed confrontation between the two rulers, after the Battle of Doljești on April 12, 1457, and Stephen the Great was aided by the Wallachians under Vlad Dracula. Both battles were won by Stephen the Great, who thus defeated his rival for the throne of Moldavia.
