= Battle of Baia =

1467 battle between Moldavia and Hungary

- Part of the Hungarian–Moldavian War
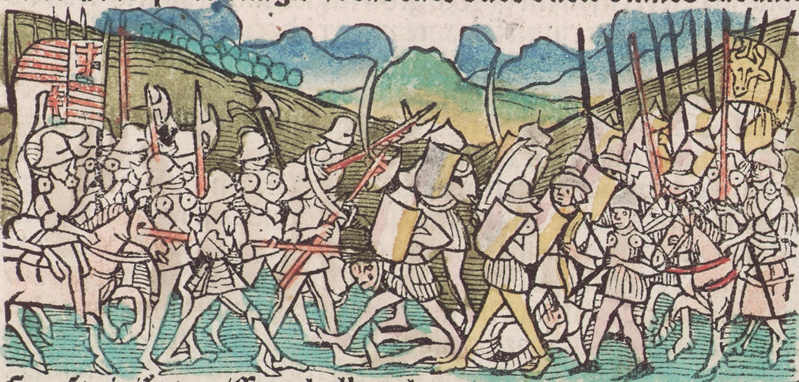
- A Hungarian battle depiction in the Chronica Hungarorum
Date	15 December 1467
Location	Baia, Moldavia (present-day Romania) 47°25′30″N 26°13′44″E
Result	See § Aftermath

Belligerents
Voivodeship of Moldavia	Kingdom of Hungary

Commanders and leaders
Stephen the Great	Matthias Corvinus (WIA)

Strength
12,000	40,000; 500 cannons 15,000–20,000 (modern estimate)

Casualties and losses
Per Janus Pannonius: 11,000 casualties	4,000–10,000 killed
- Battlefield on a map of Romania

The Battle of Baia (Romanian: Bătălia de la Baia; Hungarian: moldvabányai csata) was fought on December 15, 1467, between Moldavian prince Stephen the Great and the Hungarian king, Matthias Corvinus. Corvinus invaded Moldavia as a consequence of Stephen's annexation of Chilia—a fortress and harbour on the coast of the Black Sea—from Hungarian and Wallachian forces. It had belonged to Moldavia centuries earlier.

== Background ==
In 1359, Bogdan I of Moldavia rebelled against the King of Hungary and founded an independent Moldavia. However, the Hungarian attempts to seize control over Moldavia did not end there, and in 1429, Sigismund, Holy Roman Emperor, and also King of Hungary, met with Władysław Jagiełło, King of Poland to try to persuade him to launch a joint attack on Moldavia and divide the country in two equal parts—Polish and Hungarian. Sigismund argued that the Moldavian nation did not "owe allegiance to anyone, is accustomed to live by theft and brigandage and so is everyone's enemy." He also complained about not receiving any help for his struggle against the Turks. In the Annals of Jan Długosz, the Polish chronicler wrote the following on Władysław's reply to Sigismund:

Wladislaw replies that it would not be right to wage war on the Moldavians, who confess the Christian faith and have given him and his kingdom obedience and submission; indeed, to do this would be an act of savagery. Though some may live by brigandage, they cannot all be tarred with the same brush, nor can they be blamed for not helping King Sigismund against the Turks, because they had gone with the Poles to the given rendez-vous on the Danube and got there on time, yet had to waste two months waiting there, and then return home. Rather does the blame for this attach to King Sigismund, who failed to turn up at the appointed time. The squabbling continues for several days, at the end of which Wladyslaw stubbornness compels Sigismund to abandon the plan and seek other ventures.

After the death of Alexander I, the country was thrown into civil strife, in which the two claimants, Peter Aron III and Bogdan II, in order to gain the throne, pledged loyalty to either the Hungarian or the Polish king. The political turmoil lasted until 1457, when Stephen, son of Bogdan, having fled to Hungary and later Wallachia, with Wallachian help, gained the throne and ousted the boyars loyal to Aron. The latter fled to Poland, but was later forced to seek asylum in Hungary, after Moldavia and Poland concluded a new treaty. Stephen's objective was to regain the region of Budjak with the castles of Chilia and Cetatea Albă. The region had previously belonged to Wallachia, but had been incorporated into Moldavia in the late 14th century. Due to the decline of Moldavia during the civil war, the region reverted to Wallachia, with Chilia being co-ruled by Hungary and Wallachia.

=== Foreign relations ===
On 22 June 1462, when Prince Vlad III Dracula of Wallachia was fighting Sultan Mehmed II of the Ottoman Empire, Stephen launched an attack on Chilia (which was under Hungarian rule), with some Turkish assistance, with the objective of capturing the fortress. The Wallachians rushed to the help with 7,000 men and, together with the Hungarian garrison, battled the Moldavians and the Turks for eight days. The Turks were defeated and Stephen was wounded by a piece of shrapnel – an injury which would hasten his death. In 1465, when Vlad was in Hungary, Stephen again advanced towards Chilia with a large force and siege weapons; but instead of besieging the fortress, he showed the garrison, who favoured the Polish King, a letter in which the King required them to surrender the fortress. The garrison complied with the King's demand and Stephen entered the fortress escorted by Polish troops where he found "its two captains rather tipsy, for they have been to a wedding". Mehmed was furious about the news and claimed Chilia as being a part of Wallachia, which now was a vassal to the Porte, and demanded Stephen relinquish ownership. However, Stephen refused and recruited an army, forcing Mehmed, who was not yet ready to wage war, to accept the situation, if only for the time being. Długosz recalls that in the beginning of his reign, Stephen reformed his army by extending rights for men to bear arms:

This Stephen's rule has been so strict and just that no crime has gone unpunished and people now obey his every order. He has insisted that not only the knights and nobility should bear arms, but that farmers and villagers do so as well, for everyone has a duty to defend his fatherland. If the Voivode learns that a farmer does not have a bow, arrows and a sword, or has mustered without a spear, the culprit is condemned to death.

Hungarian flag according to the Chronica Hungarorum

One of the reconstruction variants of the Moldavian flag at the battle of Baia according to the Chronica Hungarorum

In 1466, Stephen regained Khotyn from Poland in a diplomatic victory but, in the same year, Corvinus became on bad terms with King Casimir IV Jagiellon of Poland, which frustrated the Hungarian king further, knowing that Moldavia was a Polish fief. One year later, Transylvanian locals started an uprising which Corvinus had a difficult time quelling. He later found out that Stephen had supported the rioters – probably in order to find and kill Aron. Długosz writes in his ‘’Annals’’ that in 1467, a certain "Berendeja" went to the court of Corvinus and promised to make Moldavia his vassal, if the King would in turn make him Prince of Moldavia. This theory was denounced by Romanian historian Nicolae Iorga, who argued that Corvinus started recruiting troops and took Aron with him to put him on the Moldavian throne. This is disputed by Długosz though, who in Historiae Polonicae, adds that Corvinus brought with him both Aron and Berendeja, making unknown whom the king considered more worthy of the Moldavian throne.

=== Preparations for war ===
The Hungarians recruited an army of 40,000, many drawn from Transylvania. Many knights and Hungarian aristocrats joined, one of them being Stephen Báthory, bringing 500 cannons and other heavy siege equipment. The Moldavians, being fewer in number and seeing that the Hungarians were determined to wage war, started to evacuate the population close to the border and blockade routes with felled trees.

== Battle ==
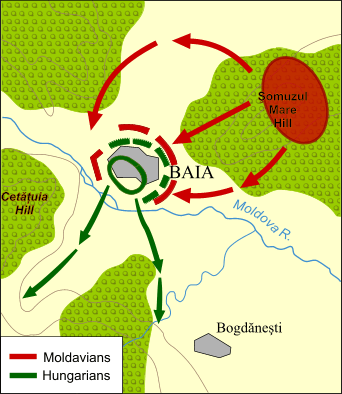
Map of the battle, showing the Moldavian attack

The Hungarians departed in the middle of October and reached the realm of Moldavia at the beginning of November, using a passage near Bacău. On 19 November, the Hungarians arrived at the Trotuș River where they met some Moldavian resistance, but Corvinus, to ensure the "loyalty of his troops, avoids a pitched battle and limits his efforts to surprise attacks and ambushes, yet is himself prevented from foraging or doing further damage".

Then the Hungarians headed for Bacău, which they also burned down; then they continued to Roman and stayed there between 29 November and 7 December. According to a chronicle, Stephen sent envoys to negotiate a peace treaty, but the two factions could not agree and the war continued. Roman was put to flames and the Hungarians killed everyone they encountered, "without considering their sex, age, or looks". After three days of marching and more pillaging, they reached Baia where Corvinus met with a Hungarian nobleman by the name of Sythotus, who revealed to him the Moldavian position, their numbers (12,000), and their plan to attack before dusk. The Moldavians were encamped further north, between Moldova River and Șomuz creek. Corvinus ordered the city to be fortified with "ramparts, ditches and a ring of wagons", as the men were told to be prepared for battle and guards were sent to guard strategic points.

A peculiar report mentions that Stephen himself was captured by the Hungarians on 14 December, but that he convinced them to release him. On 15 December, when dusk was approaching, Stephen sent smaller detachments that set the town on fire from three different places: thereafter, noise and confusion set in. Stephen ordered his men to dismount and soon after they launched their attack and made battle until dawn. Descriptions of the battle say that the fire made the night equally light as the day. The two armies started to butcher each other at the gate of the city; then the fighting continued onto the streets "with such a wrath, that nothing could be seen as more horrible than this". The Moldavians got the upper hand of the battle and launched another attack against the royal guard, which consisted of 200 heavily armed knights, the aristocrats, and Corvinus. Many Moldavians were killed in the tumult that followed, as Báthory and the rest of the knights defended the entrance to the market. Corvinus was wounded and, allegedly he had to be "carried from the battlefield on a stretcher, to avoid him falling into the hands of the enemy". For Moldavians, it was a victory because they could retreat, leaving only 14 of their battleflags in the hands of the Hungarian army, and Stephen was able to write a letter to the Polish king, stating that he won the battle. The captured Moldavian battleflags were suspended in the Boldogasszony church of Buda, as sign of victory over the vassal, the Hungarian bishop of Pécs, Janus Pannonius, and pot dedicating three epigrammas to them.

According to Długosz, Corvinus escaped the Moldavians due to the assistance of another Vlach (Romanian), whom Stephen found and had executed because of treachery. The Moldavian-German Chronicles say that someone named Isaia failed to launch the cavalry attack which would have blocked the path for the Hungarian retreat; for this, he and others were later executed. 4,000–10,000 Hungarians were said to have been killed; most of the barons survived, following their king. Janus Pannonius mentions totally 11,000 casualties for the Moldavian, with 4,000 "cut down while retreating".

== Aftermath ==
Some sources claim the battle resulted in Moldavian victory. However, others claim Hungarian victory. Some of the Hungarian standards that were captured came with a "huge booty of tents, waggons and guns", which were sent to Casimir as proof of Stephen's victory. Upon his return to Brassó on Christmas day, Corvinus took revenge on the people who had rebelled against him; thereafter he collected a war tax of 400,000 florins, which they had to pay immediately, in gold. With this money he raised an army of foreign mercenaries, which would prove more loyal to him.

Corvinus rewarded in 1469 some Romanians from Maramureș who were on Corvinus's side, for their bravery when saving the life of the king: Coroi from Oncești (Maramureș), his son Ioan, and their brothers in arms: Mihai de Petrova, Mihai Nan de Slatina, Petru Leucă from Valea Lupului, Ioan Miclea from Șugatag, Petru de Berbești, Simion son of Pop de Uglea, Lupșa de Berbești, Steț de Biserica Albă, and George Avram de Oncești.

In 1468, Stephen campaigned in Transylvania, found Aron and had him executed. Stephen and Corvinus would later negotiate a peace treaty, with Stephen accepting Corvinus as his de jure liege lord. In 1475, Corvinus sent 6,800 soldiers that assisted Stephen in his victory at the Battle of Vaslui.
