= Siege of Dâmbovița Fortress =

Battle of Moldavia against Wallachia and Ottoman Empire

- Part of the Moldavian–Ottoman Wars
Date	23 November 1473
Location	Bucharest, Wallachia
Result	Moldavian victory

Belligerents
Moldavia	Wallachia; Ottoman Empire

Commanders and leaders
Stephen III	Radu III

Casualties and losses
Unknown	Unknown (Ottoman Empire) 2,300 impaled

The siege of Dâmbovița Fortress took place on 23 November 1473 when an army of Moldavia, led by Stephen the Great, besieged the fortress where Radu the Handsome, ruler of Wallachia, had taken refuge.

After the loss at Vodna stream, in 18–20 November 1473, Radu the Handsome retreated to Dâmbovița Fortress (Bucharest). However, he did not have time to properly organize his defence, the fortress being besieged on 23 November by the troops of Stephen the Great. At night, the Wallachian voivode ran away from the fortress, leaving his flags, treasury, and family (his wife and his daughter, Maria Voichița whom Stephen married in 1475). Stephen ordered to impale 2,300 Ottoman captives.

On 24 November, Stephen the Great entered the fortress and installed Basarab the Old on the throne, after which he took a series of measures to defend the country against the Ottomans, including the ability of the ruler to name Burgraves, Basarab becoming a vassal of Moldavia
