= Lunca Mare =

- Location within Romania

Location
- Country: Romania
- Counties: Harghita County

Physical characteristics
- Mouth: Olt
  - location: Sândominic
  - coordinates: 46.5682°N 25.7913°E
- Length: 16 km (9.9 mi)
- Basin size: 54 km^{2} (21 sq mi)

Basin features
- Progression: Olt→ Danube→ Black Sea
- Tributaries
  - right: Sadocuț
- River code: VIII.1.5

The Lunca Mare is a right tributary of the river Olt in Romania. It discharges into the Olt in Sândominic. Its length is 16 km (9.9 mi) and its basin size is 54 km^{2} (21 sq mi).
