= Siege of Chilia =

Coordinates: 45°26′0.4″N 29°16′7.8″E

- Part of Moldavian–Ottoman Wars
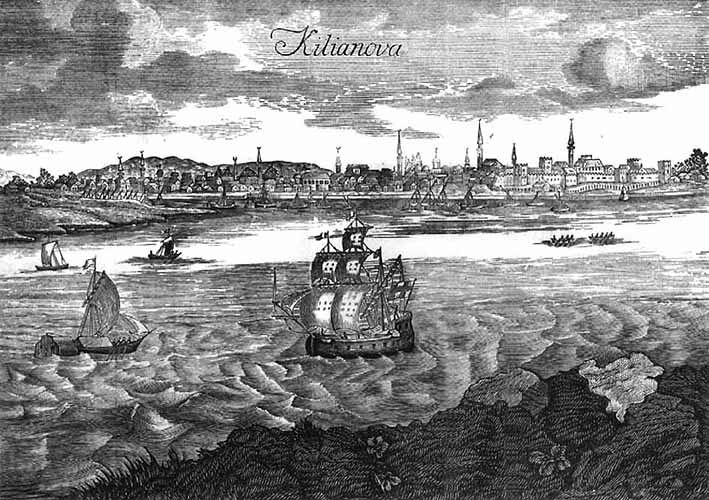
| Date | 6–14/15 July 1484 |
| Location | Chilia Fortress, Moldavia (today Kiliia, Ukraine) |
| Result | Ottoman victory |

Belligerents
| Moldavia | Ottoman Empire |

Commanders and leaders
| Mamalac Chatelev | Bayezid II |

Strength
| 8,000–10,000 | 20,000 |

The siege of Chilia in 1484 ended in the takeover of the Chilia Fortress, in the Principality of Moldavia (today located in Kiliia in present-day Ukraine), by the Ottoman Empire after a nine-day siege. The siege took place both by land and sea. After the settlement was taken, its churches were converted into mosques.
