= Hungarian–Moldavian War =

1467 Hungarian invasion of Moldavia

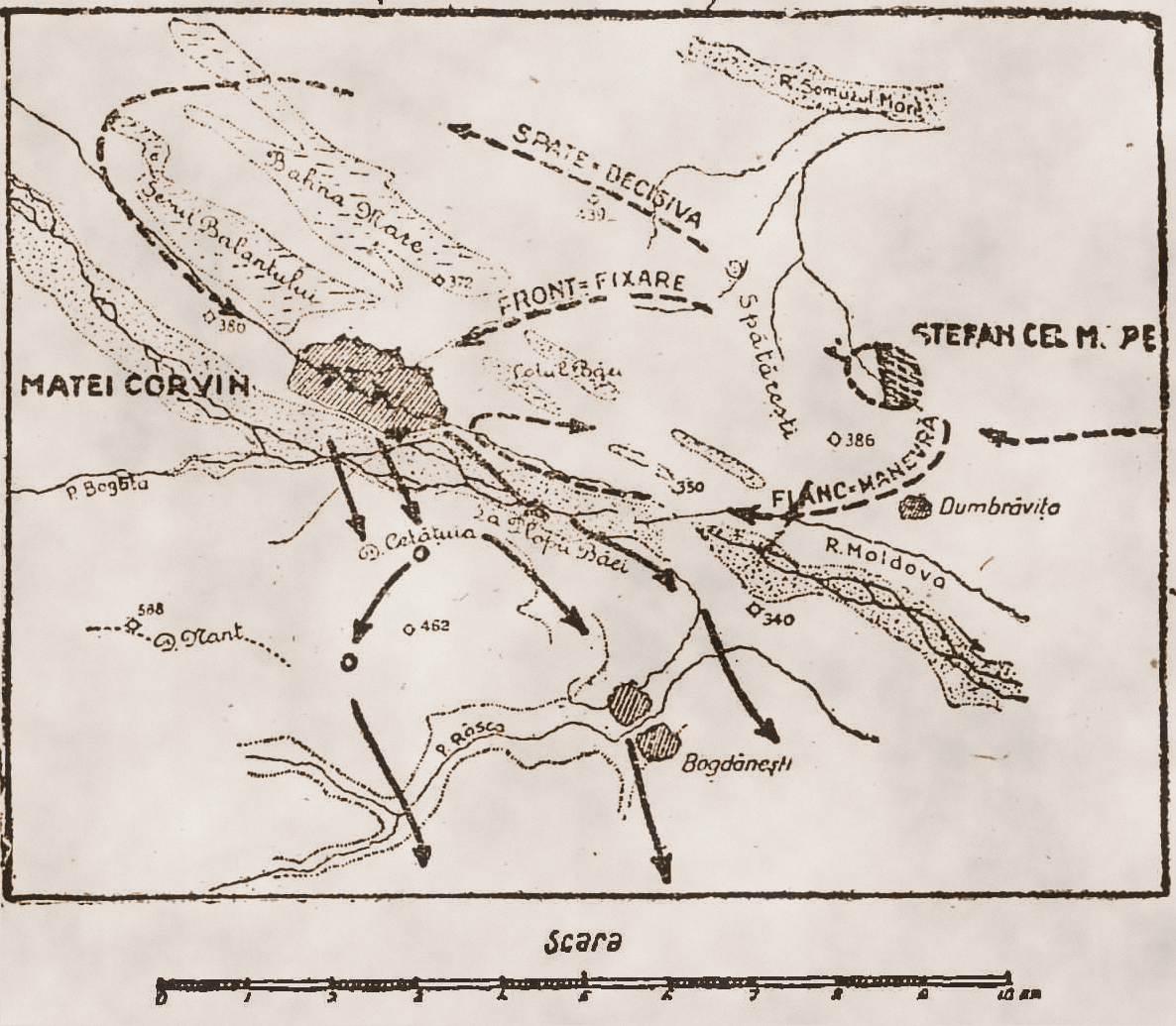
- Battle of Baia sketch by Radu R. Rosetti
Date	November – December 1467
Location	Moldavia
Result	Moldavian victory

Belligerents
Hungary	Moldavia

Commanders and leaders
Matthias I (WIA)	Stephen III

Strength
40,000; Modern estimate: 25,000	12,000; Modern estimate: 20,000

The Hungarian–Moldavian War or Moldavian campaign of Matthias Corvinus was an unsuccessful invasion launched by the Kingdom of Hungary, aimed at subjugating the Principality of Moldavia. The invasion took place from November to December, culminating in the Battle of Baia between the Hungarian army of Matthias Corvinus and Moldavian forces of Stephen the Great on 14–15 December 1467.

== Prelude ==
On September–October 1467, numerous Transylvanian towns launched a revolt against the Kingdom of Hungary. The uprising was organised by the Hungarian nobility, Székelys leaders and Transylvanian Saxons, possibly supported by Stephen the Great. However, the revolt was suppressed by Hungarian King Matthias Corvinus.

The Transylvanian revolt was likely provoked by the financial reforms of the Hungarian government. The support of Stephen for the rebels would end up serving as a justification for the Hungarian invasion of Moldavia.

== War ==
=== Initial Hungarian success ===
On November 1467, the Hungarian army of Matthias Corvinus invaded Moldavia through Oytoz Strait. On 19 November the Moldavians unsuccessfully attempted to block the Hungarian advance at Trotuș, which was burned by the Hungarian forces. On 29 November, the Moldavians unsuccessfully tried to negotiate with Hungarians at Románvásárhely (Roman) settlement. The settlement was destroyed by Hungarians on 7 December. Piatra Neamț was also destroyed by Hungarians as Matthias was heading towards Suceava and camped at Baia.

Matthias intended to weaken the Moldavian capabilities by destroying its economic hubs and deposing Stephen by the end of his campaign. Stephen intended to fight the Hungarian army through guerilla warfare and avoid a direct engagement, where the Moldavians would be disadvantaged.

=== Battle of Baia ===
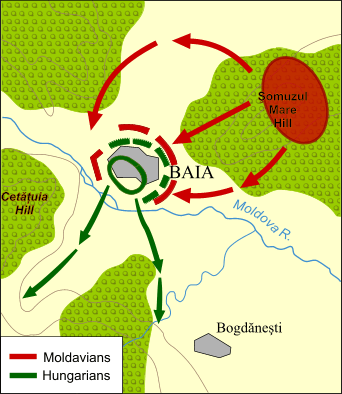
Moldavian attack during the battle

Stephen the Great intended to ambush Hungarians as they headed towards Suceava. However, Matthias Corvinus decided to camp at Baia, which prompted Stephen to launch a night attack on the Hungarian camp instead. Matthias was unprepared for such event, combined with disadvantageous environment of Baia, which made it difficult for the Hungarian army to utilize heavy cavalry. The Moldavians launched a surprise attack on Baia from three directions out of the Şomuz forests, defeating the first line of Hungarian defense.

Older sources estimated the strength of Hungarian army at 40,000 and Moldavian one at 12,000 during the Battle of Baia. However, later estimates suggest the sizes of both armies were more balanced, with 25,000 Hungarian troops and 20,000 Moldavian ones. The Moldavian army reached the center of Baia, where fierce hand-to-hand combat took place. According to Moldavian chronicles, the battle ended in Moldavian victory. However, according to Antonio Bonfini, the battle ended in Hungarian victory. Various sources reported that 4,000–12,000 Hungarians fell in battle. Bonfini reported 1,700 Hungarian and 7,000 Moldavian casualties in battle. Janus Pannonius claimed 11,000 Moldavian casualties. Matthias was heavily wounded and some sources claim that Stephen was briefly taken captive.

== Aftermath ==
The Hungarian army remained in Baia area for three more days, engaged in looting and collecting their dead. Hungarian retreat was accelerated by continued Moldavian attacks. The town was burnt during the battle. Stephen the Great in his letter to Polish King Casimir IV claimed victory, but also mentioned the great damage caused to Moldavia. Stephen signed a treaty with Kingdom of Poland on 28 July 1468, in order to deter future Hungarian aggression. This event played a major role in Polish-Moldavian relations.

The invasion is generally accepted to have ended in Hungarian failure. However, the outcome of Battle of Baia remains disputed.
