= Battle of the Cahul (1574) =

- Part of the Moldavian campaign (1574)
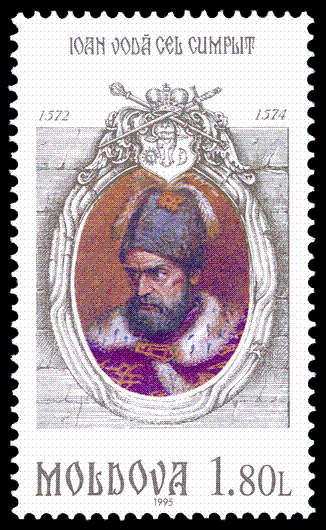
- Postcard with the image of John III, 1995
Date	9 June 1574
Location	Cahul Lake, Principality of Moldavia; Present-day Moldova and Ukraine
Result	Ottoman victory
Territorial changes	Moldavia fell under Ottoman rule

Belligerents
Ottoman Empire; Crimean Khanate	Moldavia; Zaporozhian Cossacks

Commanders and leaders
(Ottoman Empire) Cığalazade Pasha; Devlet I Giray	(Moldavia) John III the Terrible (executed); Ivan Svirhovsky (surrendered)

Strength
50,000 to 90,000; 120 cannons	43,000; 30,000 infantry; 13,000 cavalrymen; 80 cannons

Casualties and losses
28,000 casualties; (Ottoman Empire) 8,000; 20,000	Entire army annihilated

The Battle of the Cahul (Note: Turkish: Kartal Ovası Muharebesi Crimean Tatar: Kagul Cenkı Romanian: Bătălia de la Cahul Ukrainian: Битва при Кагулі) was a military engagement took place 9 June 1574 at the Cahul Lake during the Moldavian Revolt. The Ottoman-Crimean army fight against Moldavian-Cossack forces and defeat them. After the rebellious voevoda of Moldavia, John the Terrible, was able to win a series of victories over the Turkish troops, a large Turkish army went to suppress his rebellion, which, thanks to the betrayal by several Moldavian nobles, was able to completely destroy the enemy. The prince himself was executed, and the Ukrainian hetman Ivan Svirhovsky was captured and sent to an Istanbul prison.

== Background ==
The Moldavian-Ottoman Wars began in the early 15th century, the Ottomans regularly tried to capture it, and even when Moldavians became subjects (1499), there were regular unrest, which forced the Ottomans to send a large punitive expedition there in 1538. The largest uprising after that occurred in 1574, during the reign of John III the Terrible, who led a policy of terror against overconfident aristocrats and sought allies to fight Turkey. John, burdened with a huge tribute, used this as an excuse to spread the ideas of the popularity of the "liberation" war against the Ottomans. He saw a favorable moment in 1574, when the Sublime Porte demanded payment of tribute, and the Moldavians, having previously recorded major Christian successes, such as in the battle of Lepanto (1571), refused. However, other Christian powers, in particular Tsardom of Russia and Kingdom of Poland, where did John send his envoys, refused to help, except for the Zaporozhian Cossacks, who arrived with a detachment of 1,200 cavalrymen led by hetman Ivan Svirhovsky himself.

=== Start of uprising ===
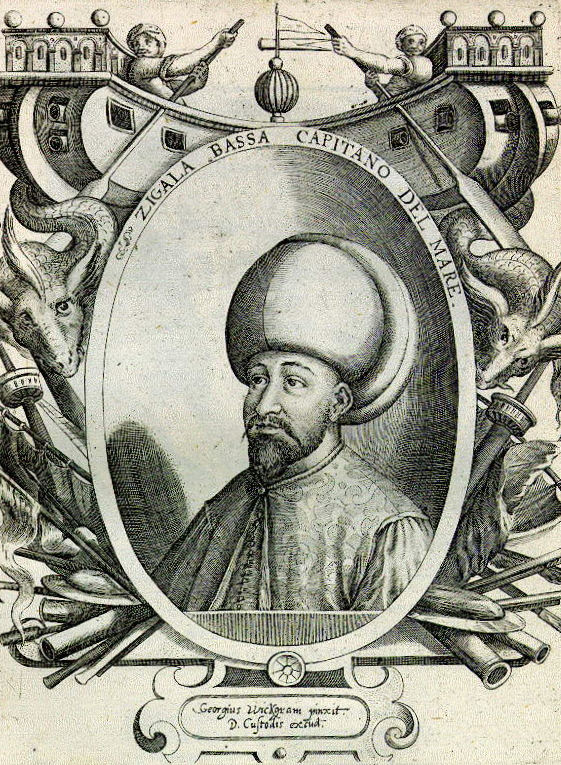
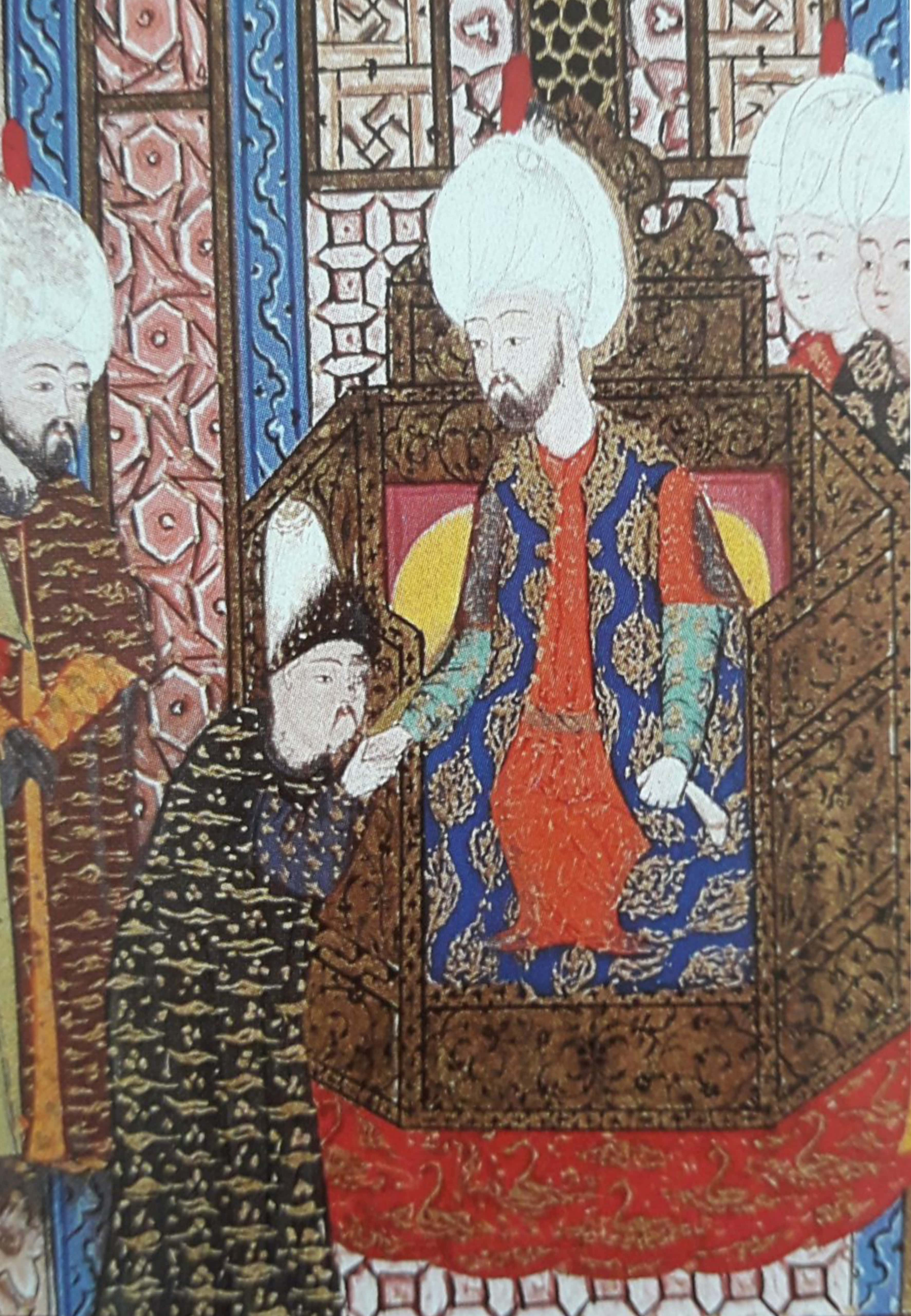
Cığalazade Pasha and Devlet Giray

Upon learning of the uprising in Moldavia, Sultan Selim II ordered his vassal Peter the Lame to go to quell the unrest. His army, according to the defectors, named in the test of the 16th century, consisted of 103,000, incl. 30,000 Turks. Trusting Svirhovsky, John entrusted him with a separate direction (separate from his main forces) Attacks directly on the enemy's camp. Tired after a long march, the troops, who were unexpectedly attacked, fled and were surrounded by the main Moldavian forces, as a result, the entire army was slaughtered. The spread of rumors about the heavy losses of the Turks and Tatars directly was used like propaganda by John to promote his struggle in Europe, which had only recently emerged from the Fourth Ottoman-Venetian War. Subsequently, the rebels won in two more clashes, and besieged the city of Brăila, which they stormed (However they did not take the citadel) and massacred the entire Muslim population there. In addition, the rebels committed many atrocities: messengers for negotiations (from Commandant of Brăila) to John were captured and hang upside down and cut off their nostrils, lips and ears. The peak of the uprising's success was the capture of Bucharest. This greatly worried the Ottomans, so they sent huge army to Moldavia under command of Cığalazade Yusuf Sinan Pasha and Devlet I Giray which were supposed to unite and defeat the rebels. At this time, the Turks were able to bribe a man close to John, Charnevich, who first unhindered the army from crossing the Danube with huge wagon train, and then misinformed John himself about the strength of the enemy.

== Battle ==
=== Before the battle ===
According to Leonard Gorecki, the number of the army that invaded Moldavia was about 200,000 people, however, according to research by Turkish historians, this number is probably overestimated and the number of troops is estimated at c. 50,000. Moldavian historians claim c. 90,000. The Allied army, according to historian Joseph von Hammer-Purgstall, consisted of 30,000 "poorly trained" infantrymen and 13,000 cavalrymen, incl. 1,200 Cossacks with 80 cannons, against 120 Ottoman cannons.

=== Main actions ===
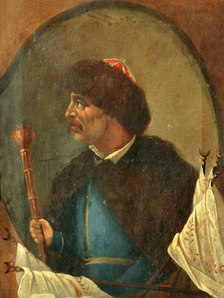
Hetmane Ivan, c. 1800s

Battle began with a remarkable incident: a part of the Moldavian army under the command of Charnevich publicly surrendered and solemnly entered the enemy camp. This stunned John's entire army and it began to retreat, the Turks, seeing this, attacked it, but John, with his usual harshness, ordered artillery fire, despite the fact that he was harming his troops. At this time, the Cossacks attacked from the flanks and the Moldavian army, seeing this and the determination of their general, also went on the offensive and a fierce battle ensued. In the subsequent battle, no one could gain a clear victory, and therefore John decided to retreat to his banners, and the Turks did the same. Upon hearing that the Ottomans could not defeat the Moldavians, citizens of Măcin, fearing John's harshness, began to flee to the south side of the Danube. However, an unforeseen circumstance happened: a heavy downpour gushed out, which put part of John's artillery out of action. 20,000 Turks (according to Goretsky) attacked this position and engaged the defenders in battle, while the Crimean Tatars, having previously been afraid, unlike the Turks, to engage in battle, due to the presence of heavy firearms by the enemy, finally abandoned their position and attacked the Moldavians in the rear with a scream, putting them to flight.

=== Retreat and capitulation ===
Having begun to retreat, almost the entire Moldavian army was slaughtered, with the exception of 20,000, who, including Svirhovsky's Cossacks, were able to temporarily break away from the pursuit by abandoning their artillery. Having stopped at the town of Rokshany, the allies realized that they were in a desperate situation, and the only chance to escape was to capitulation. The Cossacks did not accept this result. When the commander of the troops, Cığalazade Yusuf Sinan Pasha, sent an official letter to John, promising amnesty to Moldavians and to him personally, and passage to Poland for the Cossacks, he accepted it. But it turned out to be a hoax, he was quartered with the help of camels, subsequently having his head chopped off and his limbs divided as trophies. After this incident, the remaining Moldavians who had not yet been captured were attacked and were completely killed, only the Cossacks resisted, who resisted for a long time and inflicted heavy losses on the Turks, but almost all, with the exception of 16 people, died, Hetman Svirhovsky was captured.

== Aftermath ==
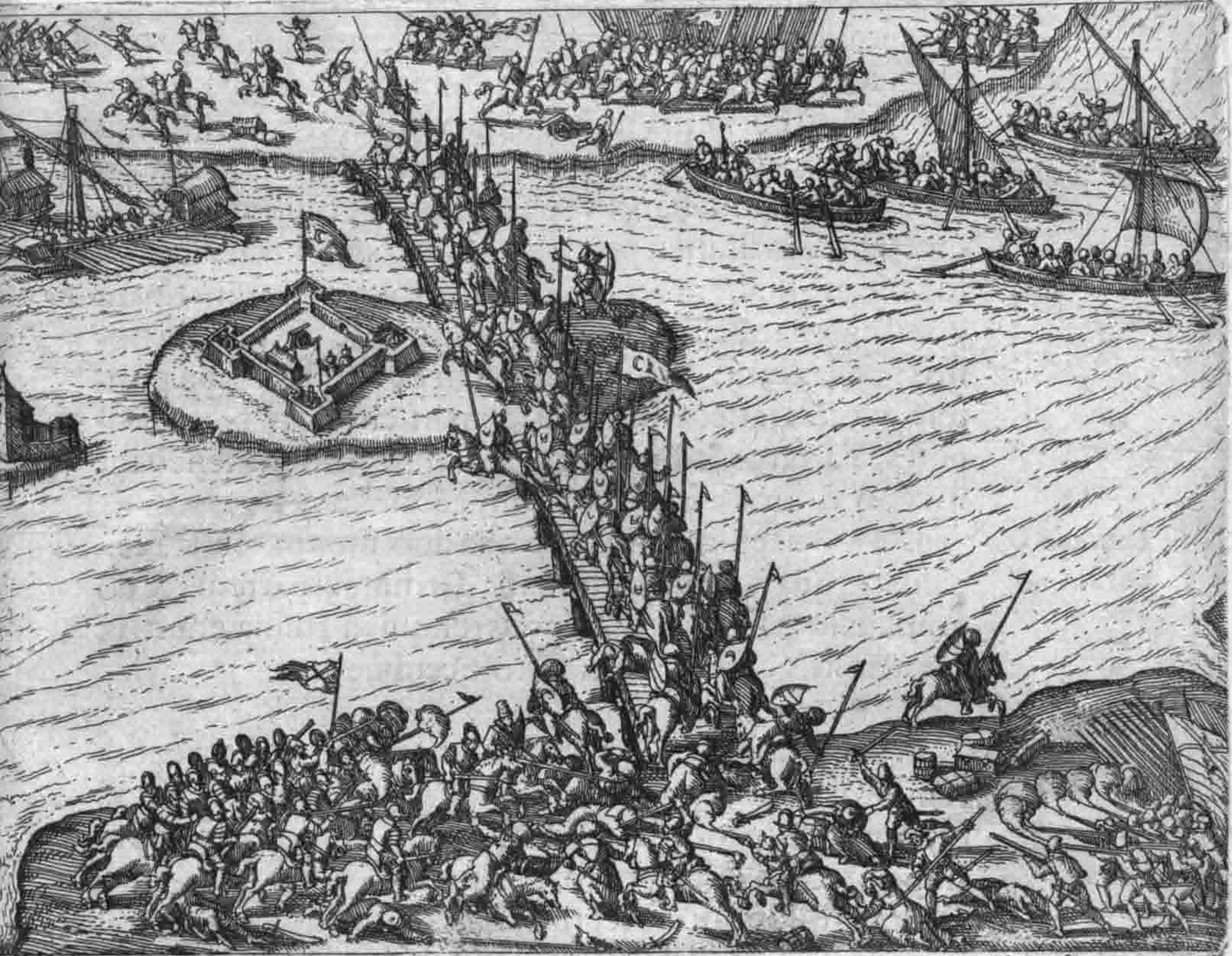
Battle of Giurgiu between Imperial-Wallachian-Molodovian army and Ottomans, 27-30 October 1595

The direct consequences of the battle were the destruction of the Moldavian-Cossack army, the death or capture of its leaders. After that, the Tatars began a terrible looting of the region. However, the Turkish-Tatar units also suffered heavy losses - 28,000 people, of which 8,000 were Turks. Despite the fact that the Tatars were taking revenge for the atrocities John had previously inflicted on local Muslims, the sultan severely condemned them. Because according to the norms of Ottoman law, all honest taxpayers, regardless of religion, cannot be subjected to violence. However, he did this not out of humanity, but because after the suppression of John's uprising in Moldavia, there might simply be no sources of income left. Despite this, Moldavia remained an extremely turbulent region, largely due to the intensification of the Cossacks, who led by Ivan Pidkova, conquered it in 1577. The Polish authorities executed the instigator of the campaign, but now the raids of the Cossacks on Turkey and Crimea have become something commonplace. The next major uprising led by Michael the Brave occurred at the end of the 16th century, when the Ottomans even lost control of Wallachia and Moldavia during the Long Turkish War due to the intervention of the Holy Roman Empire. Nevertheless, thanks to a combination of force and diplomacy, as well as the influence of the Battle of Keresztes on the population, which ended in a major victory for the Ottomans, the region was regained with some losses (the emperors of Austria ceased to be tributaries of the sultan).
