= Moldavian campaign (1574) =

Moldavian Campaign (1574)
- Part of the Moldavian–Ottoman Wars
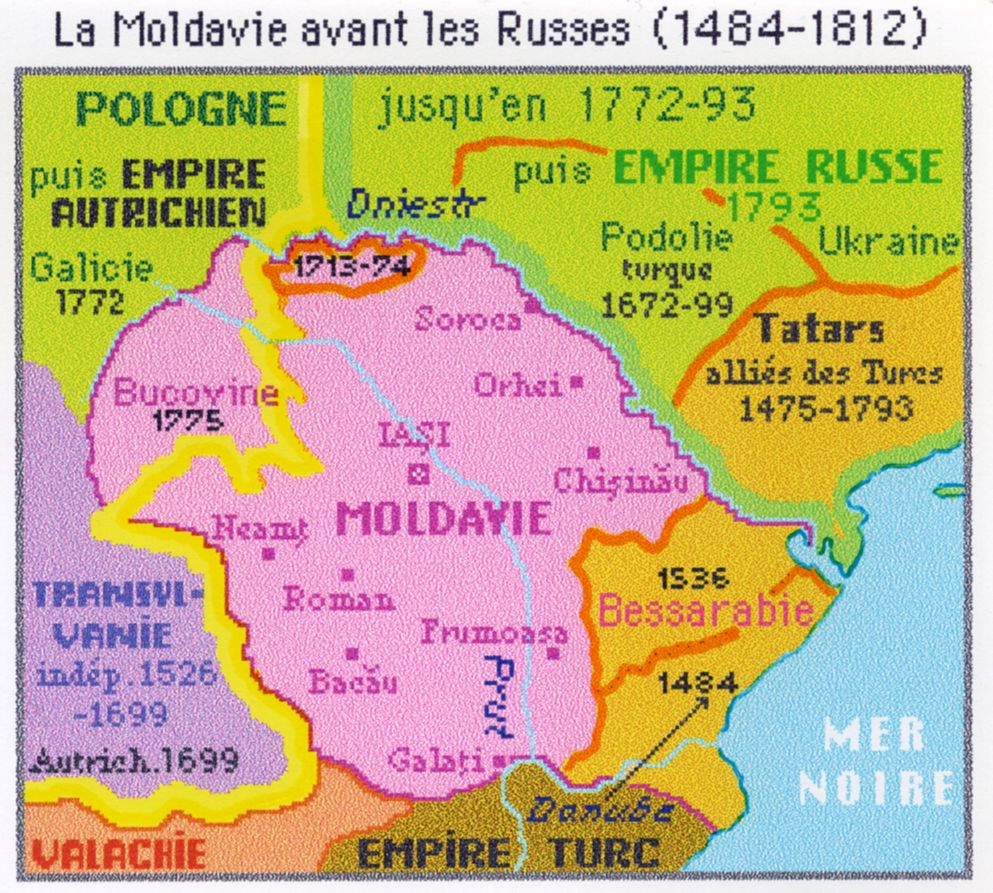
- Moldavia under Ottoman administration
Date	April – July 1574
Location	Moldavia
Result	Ottoman victory

Belligerents
Ottoman Empire; Crimean Khanate; Wallachia; Principality of Transylvania	Moldavia; Zaporozhian Cossacks (Poland) Some Polish Hetmans

Commanders and leaders
(Ottoman Empire) Selim II (Ottoman Empire) Cığalazade Pasha (Ottoman Empire) Sokollu Pasha (Ottoman Empire) Mustafa Pasha (POW); Devlet I Giray (Wallachia) Peter the Lame (Wallachia) Alexander II Mircea	(Moldavia) John III the Terrible (executed); Ivan Svirhovsky (surrendered)

Strength
Jiliște: 100,000; 100 cannons Cahul: 50,000–90,000; 120 cannons	Jiliște: 30,200–40,000; 110 cannons Cahul: 43,000; 80 cannons

The Moldavian Campaign was a military operation carried out by the Ottoman Empire against the Principality of Moldavia, one of its vassal states, in 1574.

After John III the Terrible ascended to the Moldavian throne in February 1572 with Ottoman support and later rebelled, Ottoman forces decisively defeated the Moldavian army at the Subsequently, Petru IV, from the Basarab dynasty of Wallachian origin, was installed as the new Voivode of Moldavia.

== Before the campaign ==
With Ottoman support, Ioan III ("Ioan the Terrible") ascended to the Moldavian throne in February 1572. However, he initially faced resistance from the deposed Voivode Bogdan Lăpușneanu. The ousted ruler, backed by two hetmans from the Polish-Lithuanian Commonwealth, gathered 2,000 soldiers and marched against Ioan. Nevertheless, this small force disbanded upon seeing the Moldavian army. Subsequently, reinforced by Turkish units from Vidin, Nikopol, Vučitrn, Bender, and Silistra, Ioan III successfully repelled the Polish forces in Moldavian territory. During these events, the Ottoman Empire and the Polish-Lithuanian Commonwealth had been at peace since 1500. Sultan Selim II sent a letter to King Sigismund II Augustus of Poland, warning him about border violations and demanding the extradition of the former Moldavian Voivode Lăpușneanu, who had fled to Polish territory. In response, Poland sent an envoy to Istanbul requesting Lăpușneanu's reinstatement to the throne. The Ottoman court, however, stipulated that Lăpușneanu must come to Istanbul and apologize before reconsidering his situation. Nonetheless, King Sigismund II Augustus died on July 7, 1572, stalling Poland’s initiative. Lăpușneanu then fled to Austria and launched an unsuccessful raid on Transylvania. Sultan Selim II subsequently wrote to Holy Roman Emperor Maximilian II requesting Lăpușneanu's extradition, but no further news was ever received about him.

In 1573, Moldavian Voivode Ioan III, seeing his throne in jeopardy, sought support from the Polish-Lithuanian Commonwealth. However, he failed to gain assistance from Henry de Valois, who had ascended to the Polish throne with Ottoman support. The Ottoman court, dissatisfied with Ioan's suspicious behavior and his execution of wealthy Moldavian boyars and confiscation of their properties, deposed him in 1574 and appointed Petru IV, the brother of the Wallachian Voivode, as the new Moldavian Voivode.

Ioan, however, began assembling an army in the capital, Iași. On March 21, 1574, he further strengthened his forces with 1,200 cavalrymen led by Cossack Hetman Swiercewski and openly rebelled against the Ottomans.

== Campaign ==
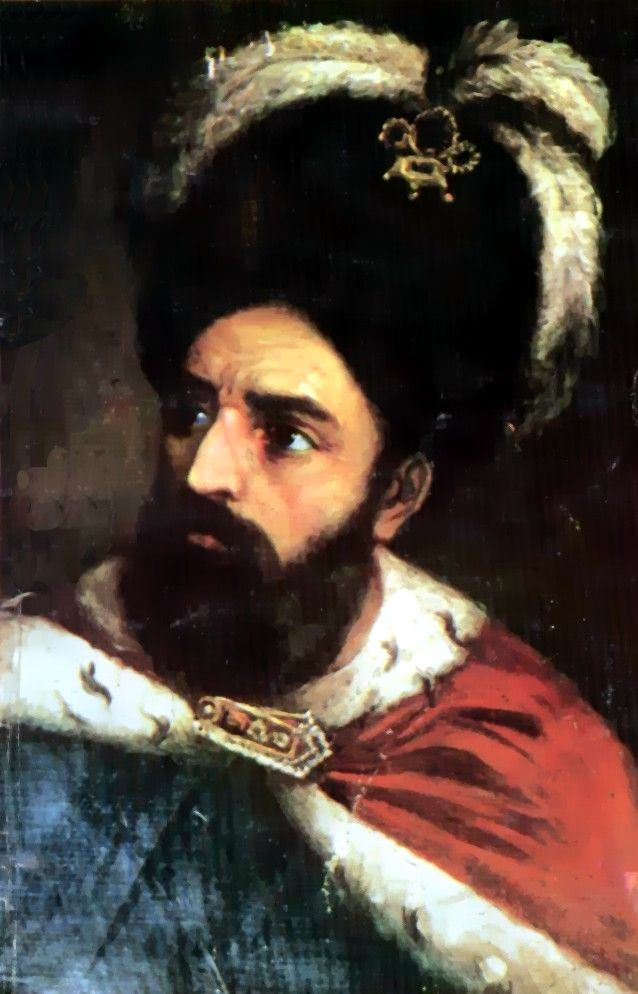
Rebel Moldavian Voivode Ioan III

The Moldavians and Zaporozhian Cossacks achieved success at the Battle of Jiliște, capturing Kara Mustafa Pasha and transporting him to Warsaw as a captive. As Ioan advanced near the Danube, threatening the villages and towns along the river, the Ottoman Empire mobilized forces from the Danube region, as well as troops from Wallachia, Transylvania, and the Crimean Khanate. The campaign was planned to encircle the Moldavian army from the north and south, cutting off escape routes from Moldavia. The Transylvanian Voivode was to bring his soldiers and cannons to Hotin, where he would join the troops led by the Bender Sanjak-bey to block the route to Poland. Command of these forces was given to Crimean Khan Devlet I Giray. Approximately 38,000 soldiers gathered at Hotin. To prepare for a potential siege in case Ioan retreated to a fortress, siege equipment was also dispatched via Ottoman galleys.

To the south, about 35,000 soldiers from the Silistra province and the districts of Köstendil, Nikopol, Alaca Hisar, and Vulçitrin assembled. The Wallachian Voivode was ordered to wait at Çokaniş ("Ciorâşti") on the Wallachian-Moldavian border. Additionally, 1,500 riflemen and 25 artillery pieces were sent from Istanbul. This army was commanded by Sinan Pasha.

In response, Ioan launched a preemptive strike, sending a force led by Polish Hetman Osztroczki to attack the Bender fortress, which was only lightly defended by an Ottoman garrison. Taking advantage of the Crimean army's delayed arrival, this force also plundered Akkerman. (Akkerman had been annexed by the Ottomans under Bayezid II in 1484, and Bender by Suleiman the Magnificent in 1538 as former Moldavian territories.) On June 10, 1574, during the Battle of the Kartal Plain, the Moldavian army was defeated following a northern assault by Crimean cavalry. Ioan, accompanied by 200-300 soldiers, sought refuge in Focșani but was surrounded by the Ottoman army in a forest and captured. He was executed after being taken into custody.

== Aftermath ==
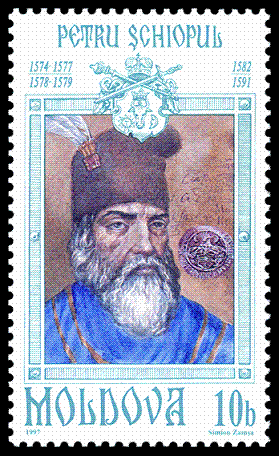
Moldavian Voivode Petru IV (1574-1577)

The Crimean army dispersed throughout Moldavia, looting the entire region. The new Voivode, Petru IV, met with Sinan Pasha and Crimean Khan Devlet I Giray, expressing concerns over the difficulties in collecting annual tribute due to the devastation and requesting the release of Moldavian prisoners. Except for captured Moldavian soldiers, civilians were released.

With Ottoman support, Petru IV ascended to the Moldavian throne in Iași on June 24, 1574. However, as a member of the Wallachian Basarab dynasty, he struggled to gain the support of Moldavian boyars. The Polish-Lithuanian Commonwealth sent an envoy to Istanbul protesting the dynastic change in Moldavia. In response, Grand Vizier Sokollu Mehmed Pasha reminded them that Poland had supported Ioan III with 2,000 soldiers during the Battle of the Kartal Plain. Sultan Selim I emphasized that Moldavian boyars and Ioan III’s family, who had fled to Poland, had also taken the Moldavian treasury. He demanded the return of the stolen funds and the extradition of the fugitives.

On September 7, 1574, the Polish-Lithuanian Commonwealth assured the Ottoman envoy that although some Polish Hetmans and Cossacks had supported Ioan III, Poland as a state had not. They also confirmed the return of Ioan’s relatives to Moldavia.
