= Ion Vodă =

Ion Vodă or Ioan Vodă (Romanian for "John the Voivode") may refer to several figures in Romanian history.

== People ==
- Ioan I Joldea, Prince of Moldavia in 1552
- Ioan Iacob Heraclid, Prince of Moldavia in 1561–1563
- John III the Terrible, Prince of Moldavia in 1572–1574
- Ioan Potcoavă, Prince of Moldavia in 1577
- Iancu Sasul, Prince of Moldavia in 1579–1582
- Ioan Ι Mavrocordat, Prince of Moldavia in 1711
- John Mavrocordatos, Prince of Moldavia in 1716–1719
- Ioan II Mavrocordat, Prince of Moldavia in 1743–1744
- Ioan Teodor Callimachi, Prince of Moldavia in 1758–1761
- John Caradja, Prince of Wallachia in 1812–1818
- Ioan Sturdza, Prince of Moldavia in 1822–1828

== Places ==
- a village in Ciutulești, Moldova
