= Nallı Masjid =

19th-century mosque in Istanbul, Turkey

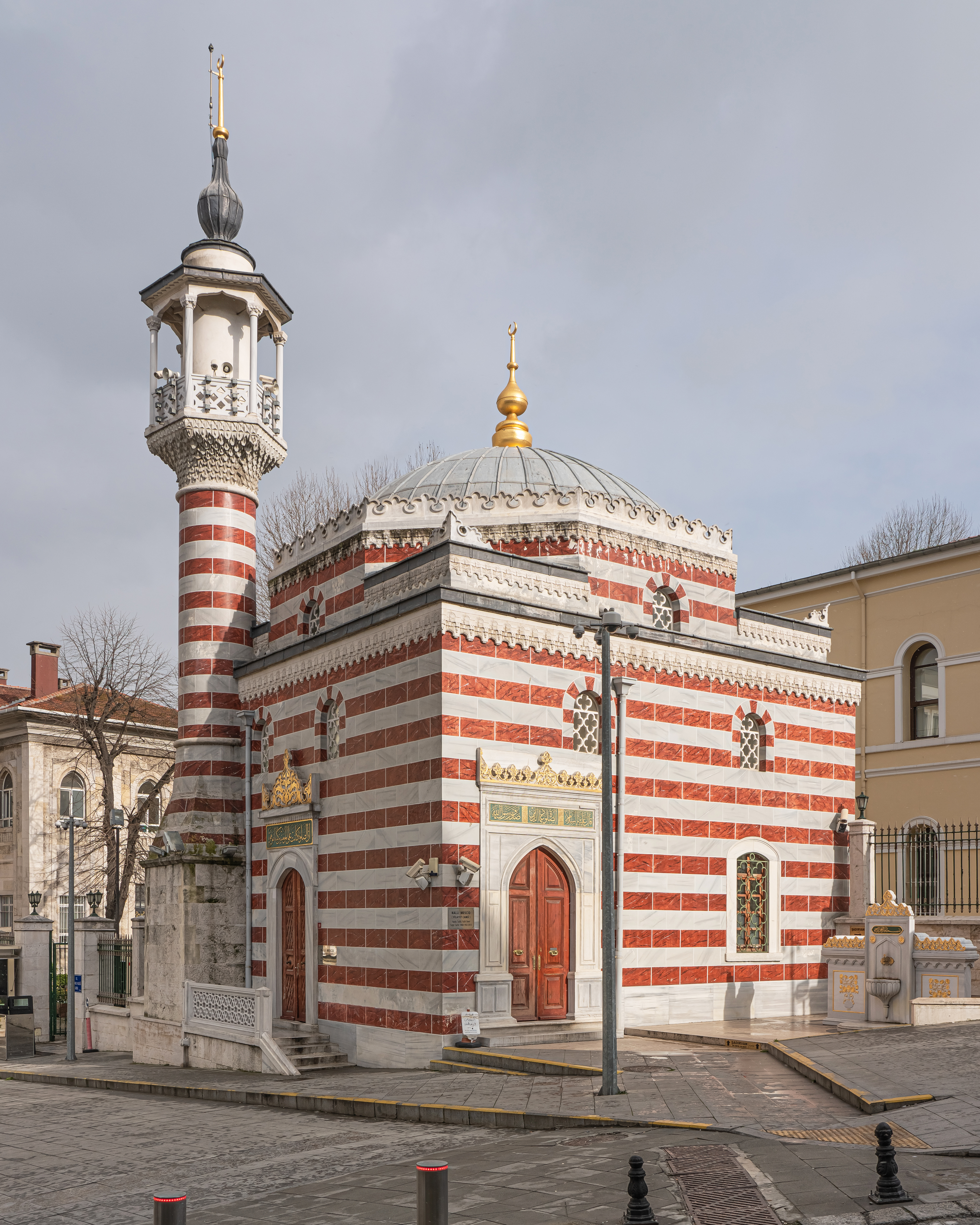

- Location of the mosque in the Fatih district of Istanbul, Turkey

Religion
- Affiliation: Sunni Islam
- Ecclesiastical or organisational status: Active

Location
- Location: Fatih, Istanbul, Turkey
- Coordinates: 41°00′45″N 28°58′32″E

Architecture
- Type: Mosque
- Style: Ottoman architecture
- Completed: 1869; 157 years ago
- Minaret: 1

Nallı Masjid (Turkish: Nallı Mescit), also known as İmam Ali Mescidi or Babıali Mescidi, is a late 19th-century small mosque located at Ankara Street northwest of the historic Sublime Porte building (which is the Istanbul Governor's Office today), at Cağaloğlu quarter of Fatih district of old Istanbul, Turkey.

== History ==
It was built by İmam Ali Efendi, a relative of Ottoman religious scholar, poet and mystic saint Akshamsaddin (1389–1459) during the Ottoman Sultan Mehmed the Conqueror (reigned 1444–1446, 1451–1481) in the 15th century. Originally, the mosque was situated within the yard of the Sublime Porte Building with one side on Ankara Street. It came to appearance when the traffic on the Ankara Street became limited due to the construction of Marmaray. İmam Ali Efendi's grave is found behind the close Cevdet Pasha Library building. It was turned into a mosque after Grand vizier Hekimoğlu Ali Pasha's (1689–1758) brother Feyzullah Efendi built a minbar. The building burnt down during the Fire of Sublime Porte (Turkish: Bab-ı Ali Yangını) in the 1800s. According to the inscription calligraphed by Mustafa İzzet Efendi, the mosque was rebuilt in 1869. A second inscription by Sami Efendi states its restoration in 1902.

== Architecture ==
The mosque is designed in eclectic architectural style and some details are used which are normally seen in the Indian and Iranian architecture. It is painted today in red and white, although the original color was yellow and beige. It has a square-plan of 8.50 m × 8.50 m (27.9 ft × 27.9 ft) dimensions. It has one dome sitting on an octagonal haunch. The mosque's only minaret was built in ashlar, and has one balcony.

The mosque takes its name "Nallı" (literally: horseshoe) from reliefs of horseshoe figures found on the minaret.

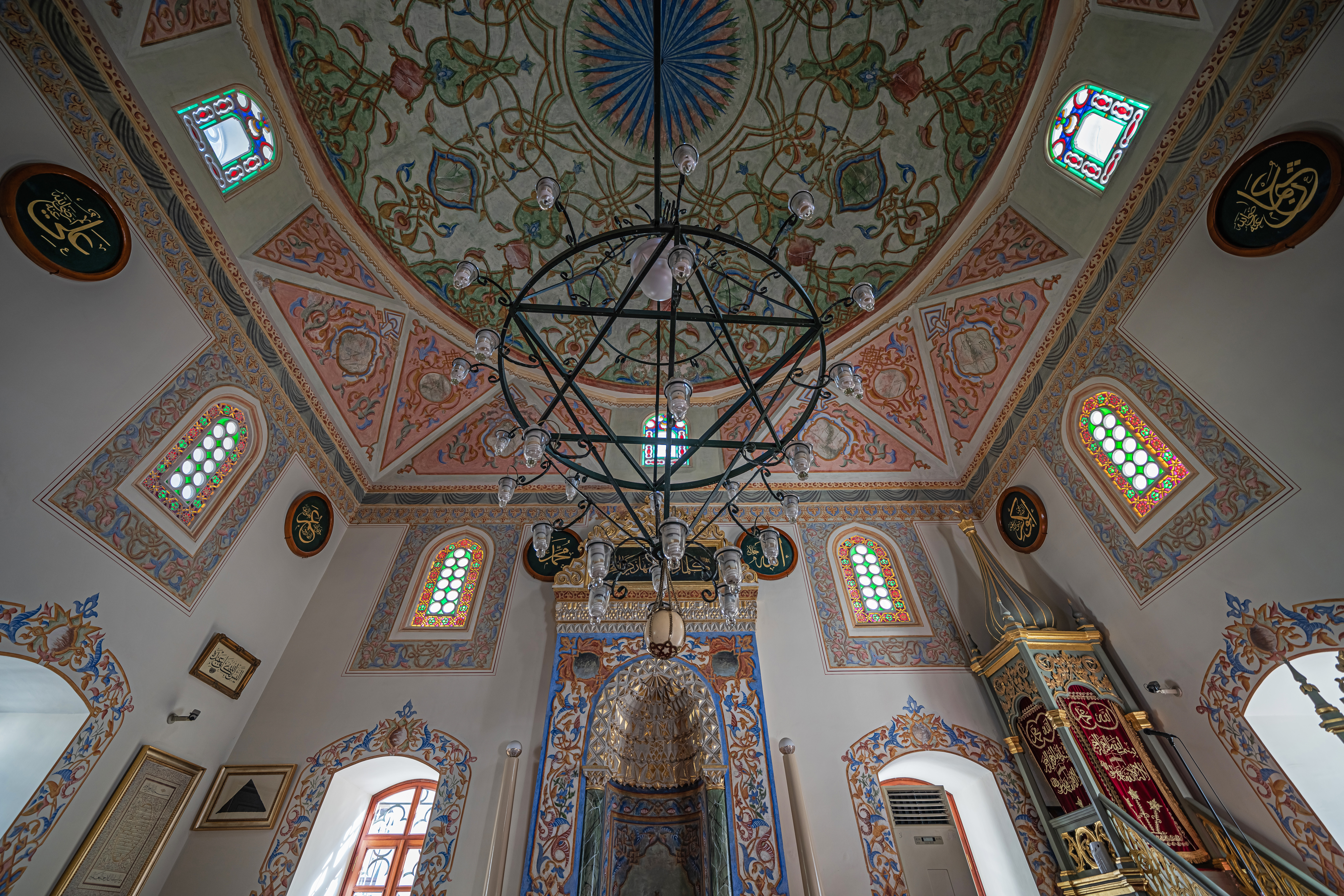
Interior view

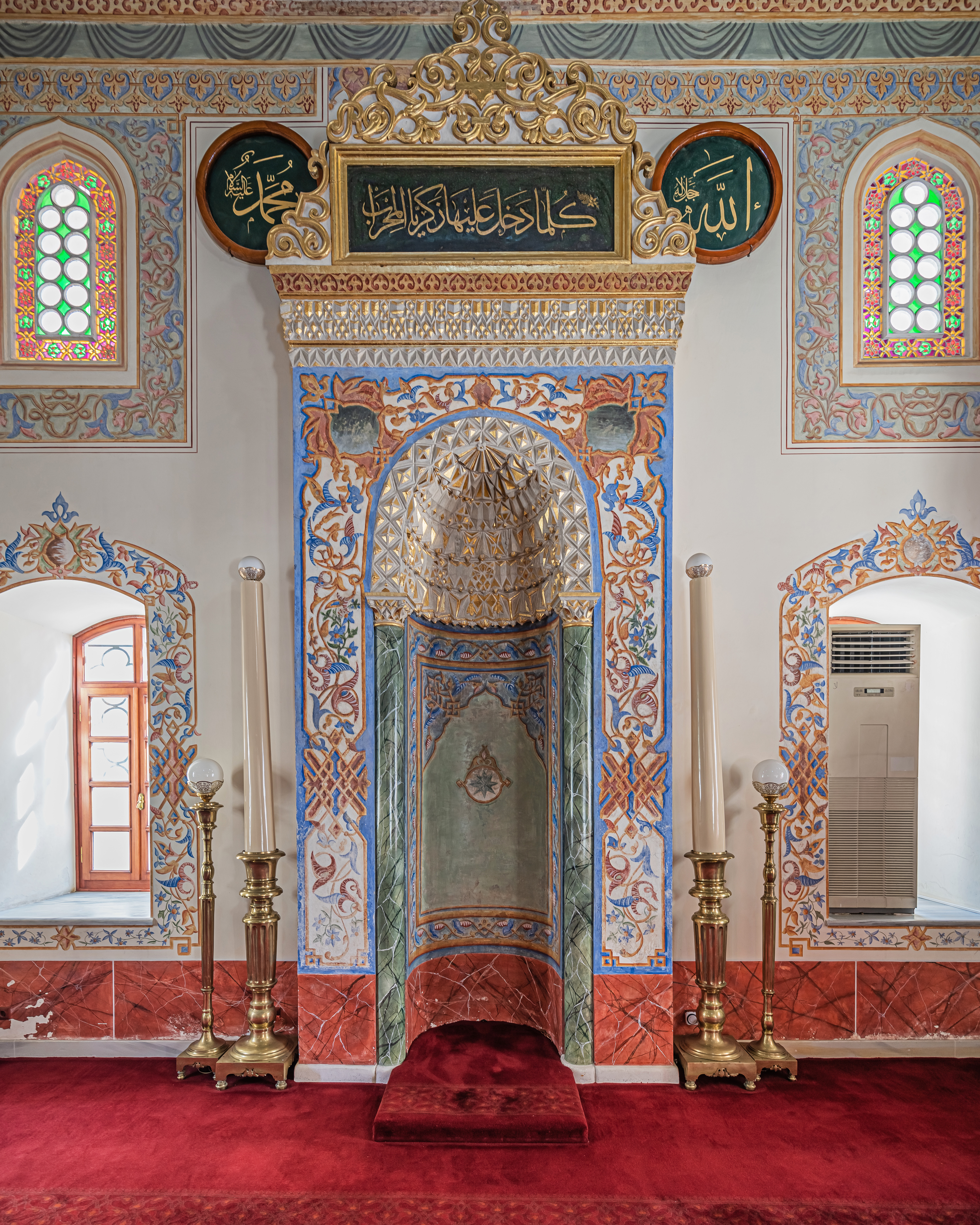
The mihrab

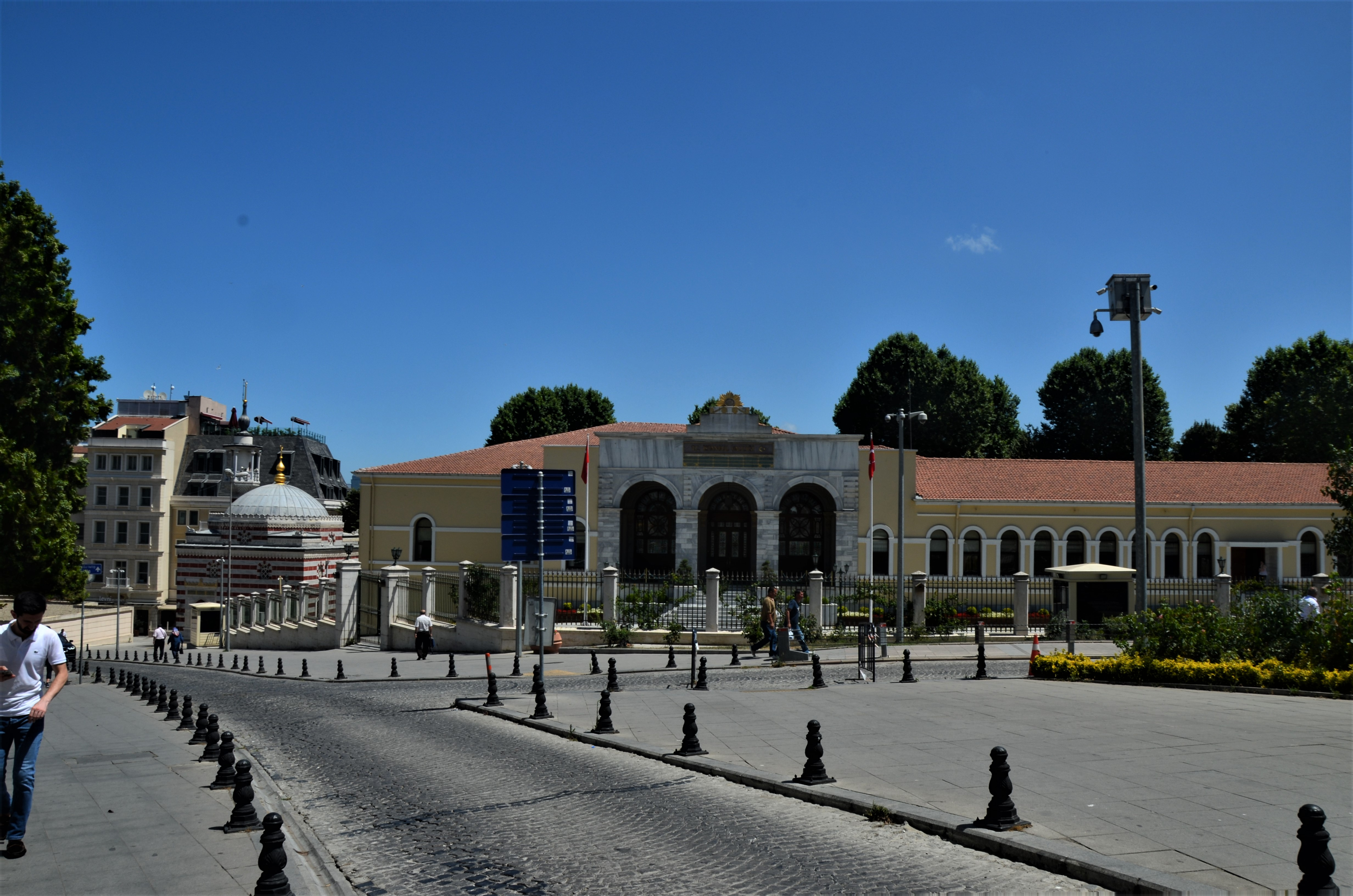
Nallı Masjid (left) next to the Istanbul Governor's Office, former headquarters of the Ottoman Government, called the Sublime Porte
