= Cağaloğlu =

Quarter located in the Fatih district of Istanbul, Turkey

Coordinates: 41°00′46″N 28°58′31″E

Cağaloğlu is a quarter located in the Fatih district of Istanbul, Turkey. Much of the publishing industry in Istanbul is located in Cağaloğlu. It is also famous for its ancient hamam (bathhouse), known as the Cağaloğlu Hamam.

== Name ==
The quarter gets its name from Cigalazade Yusuf Sinan Pasha (Turkish: Cağaloğlu Yusuf Sinan Paşa; c. 1545–1605), born as Scipione Cicala, an Ottoman admiral and statesman of Genoese descent, as well as a member of the influential Cicala family of Genoa. The original name Cigalaoğlu (meaning "of the Cigala (Cicala) family", or literally "Cigala-son" as a Turkified surname) eventually turned into Cağaloğlu through the course of centuries.

== Notable buildings ==
- Cağaloğlu Anadolu Lisesi, formerly Istanbul Girls' High School, established in 1850
- Cağaloğlu Hamam, a historic public bath from 1741
- Istanbul Governor's Office, 1756-built, former headquarters of Ottoman Government
- Istanbul High School, established in the 1880s
- Nallı Masjid, 19th century small mosque
- Rüstem Pasha Medrese, a historic religious institution from 1551
