= Armeni =

Armeni can refer to:

- Armenoi, a village in Chania regional unit, Crete, Greece
- Armenoi, Rethymno, a village in Rethymno regional unit, Crete, Greece
- Armeni, a village in Loamneș Commune, Sibiu County, Romania
- Armeni, a village in Slobozia Ciorăști Commune, Vrancea County, Romania
- Silvia Armeni is an Italian-born Canadian wildlife artist

== See also ==
- Armenia
