= Battle of Jiliște =

Battle between Moldavia and Ottoman Empire in 1574

- Part of the Moldavian campaign (1574)
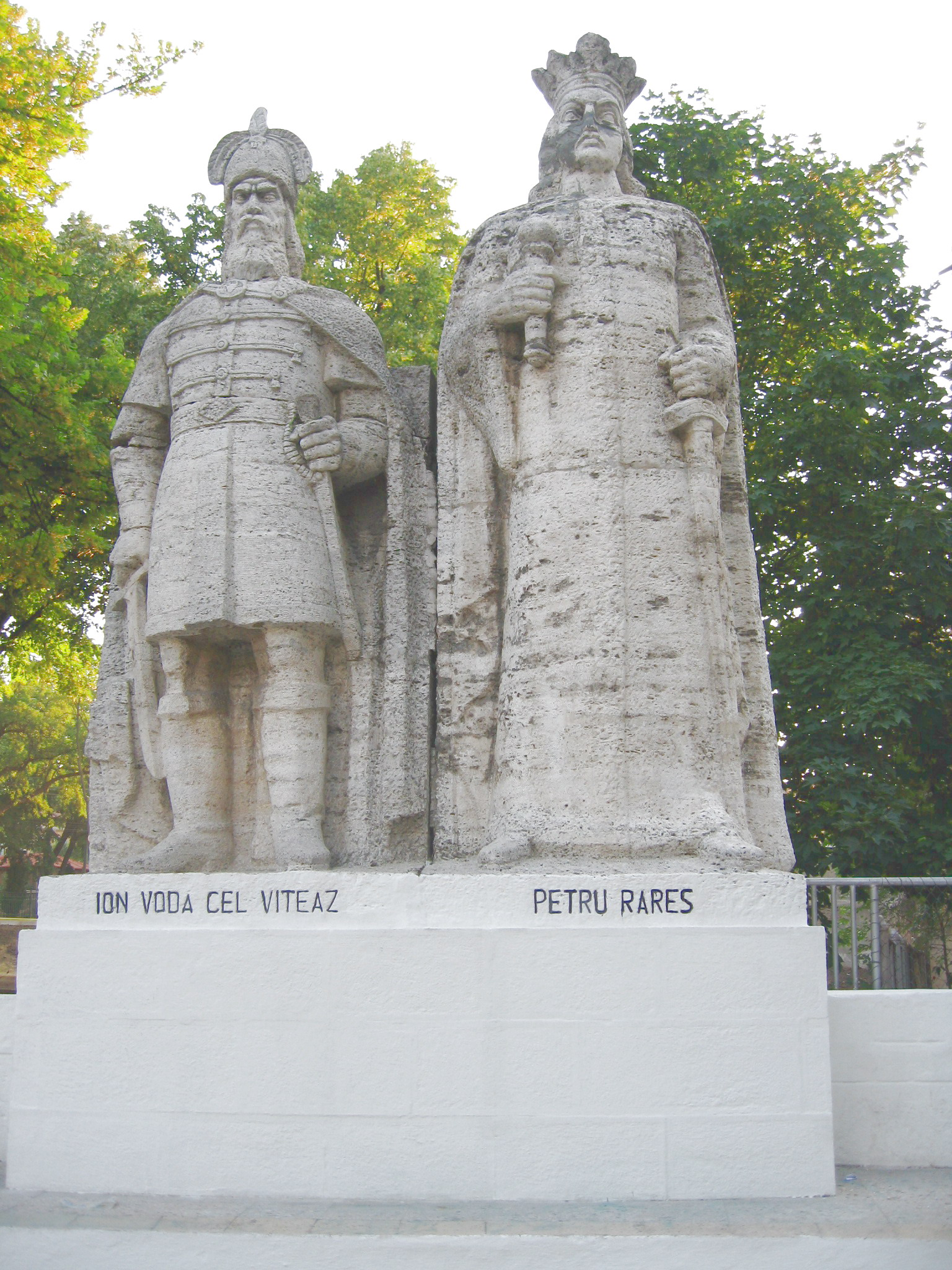
- Monuments to Ioan Vodă and Petru Rareș in Iași
Date	24 April 1574
Location	Jiliște, Moldavia
Result	Moldavian–Cossack victory

Belligerents
Moldavia; Zaporozhian Cossacks	Ottoman Empire; Crimean Khanate; Wallachia

Commanders and leaders
(Moldavia) John III the Terrible; Ivan Svirhovsky	(Ottoman Empire) Sokollu Mehmed (Ottoman Empire) Kara Mustafa (POW) (Wallachia) Peter the Lame (Wallachia) Alexander II Mircea

Strength
30,200–40,000 (Note: 20,000 Moldavian infantrymen and 9,000–10,000 cavalrymen, combined with 1,200 Cossacks. Other estimates suggest 40,000 troops for full strength of Moldavian forces.); 110 cannons	50,000 (Full strength of the Ottoman coalition army); 100 cannons

Casualties and losses
Unknown	(Ottoman Empire) Heavy (Wallachia) Entire force annihilated (Note: The Wallachian guard was destroyed, not the whole Wallachian army, but the losses in battle were heavy with Wallachian lords forced to flee.)

The Battle of Jiliște took place between the Moldavian–Cossack armies of John III the Terrible and Ivan Svirhovsky against the Ottoman–Crimean–Wallachian armies of Sokollu Mehmed Pasha, Peter the Lame and Alexander II Mircea. It took place on 24 April 1574 and resulted in Moldavian–Cossack victory.

== Prelude ==
In February 1572, John III the Terrible took power in Moldavia, becoming the new hospodar. He resented Sokollu Mehmed Pasha and considered himself to be the rightful successor of Stephen the Great, intending to pursue Stephen's policy of Moldavian independence from the Ottoman rule. By the spring of 1574, John III increased the size of Moldavian army to 30,000 infantrymen and up to 10,000 cavalrymen, supported by 110 cannons. The Ottomans demanded to double the Moldavian tribute payments to Istanbul, a demand that John III declined. He established connections with the Kingdom of Poland and secured the support of 1,200 Zaporozhian Cossacks under Ivan Svirhovsky. Sultan Selim II was unhappy with this turn of events. The Ottomans mobilised an army of 100,000 for invasion of Moldavia, supported by 100 cannons.

== Battle ==
The Ottoman coalition consisted of Wallachians and Crimean Tatars, which included Wallachian lords Peter the Lame and Alexander II Mircea. The Ottomans headed towards Buzău, Râmnicu Sărat. The Moldavian hospodar John III moved towards southern Moldavia, as he planned to confront the Ottoman forces at the gates of Focșani. At this time, the Ottoman forces set up a camp south of Focșani, at Jiliște.

The Ottoman camp was guarded by Wallachian outposts north of Jiliște, which were annihilated by Moldavians, killing up to 400 Wallachian guards. John III first attacked the Ottoman camp at night with 6,000 of his cavalrymen, which included 1,200 Cossacks. The Wallachian outposts had their fires kept lit in order to keep the Ottoman guard down John III would then organise his entire army and strike from three directions at the same time, taking the Ottoman forces by surprise and inflicting heavy losses.

== Aftermath ==
The Wallachian lords Peter the Lame and Alexander II Mircea and barely escaped the chaotic battlefield, where the Ottoman coalition was routed by Moldavians and Cossacks. Many high-ranking Ottoman officers were captured by the Cossacks, including Kara Mustafa Pasha. The battle of Jilişte marked the first major confrontation of John III's resistance against the Ottoman Empire. Moldavians defeated the Ottomans at Brăila, Budjak and Tighina, also routing the Ottoman–Crimean forces east of the Dniester. However, John III would later get betrayed by his boyars, combined with increased Ottoman efforts to subjugate Moldavia in response to their aggressive resistance, which would lead to John III's death.
