= Pidkova's Moldavian campaign (1577) =

Moldavian Campaign
- Part of the Cossack raids
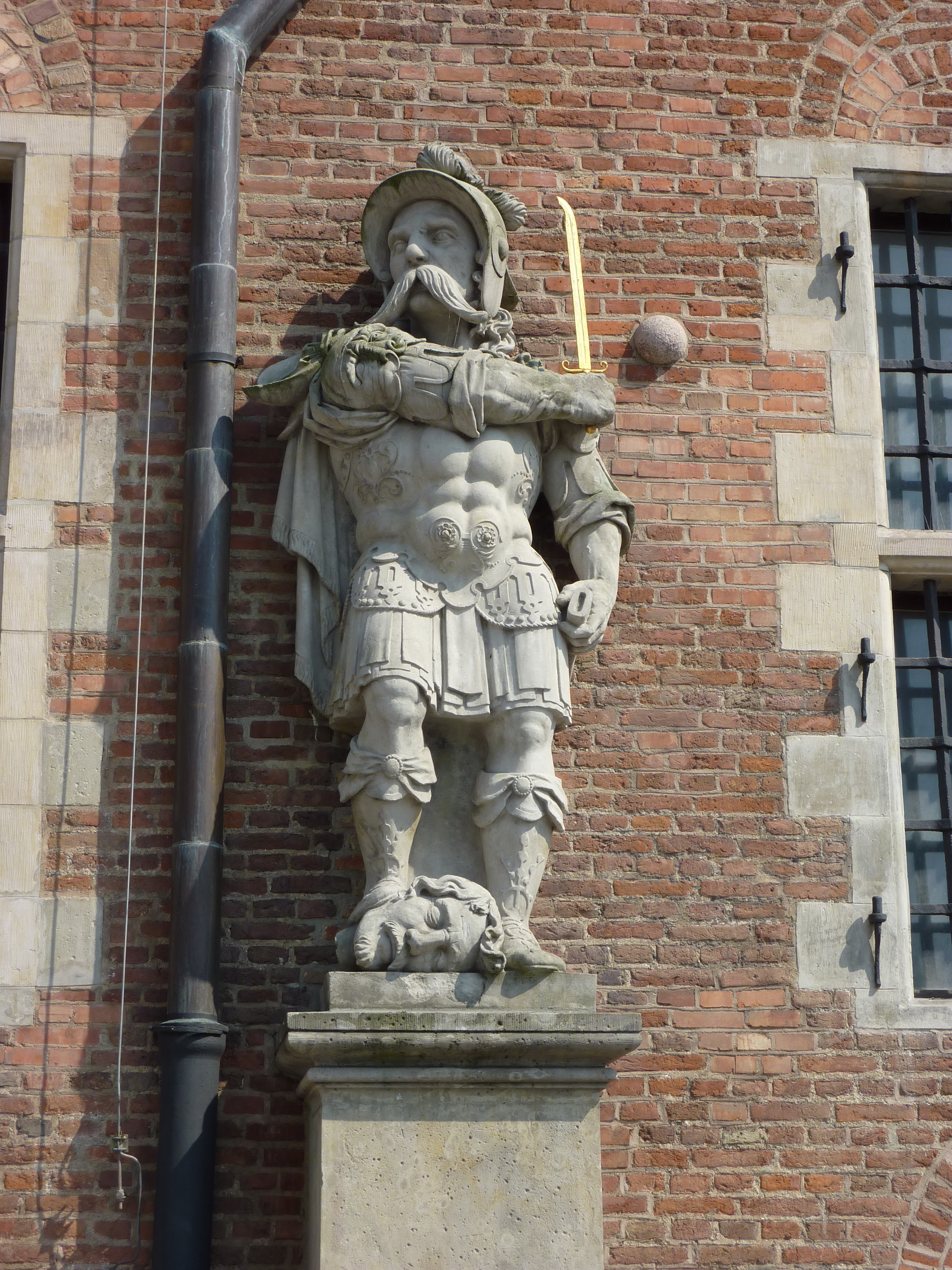
- Cossack with a head of Ivan Pidkova, baroque sculpture from Great Armoury in Gdańsk
Date	11–29 November 1577
Location	Moldavia
Result	Cossack victory
Territorial changes	Capture of Iași and Pidkova's assumption of temporary power

Belligerents
Zaporozhian Cossacks	Moldavia; Ottoman Empire

Commanders and leaders
Ivan Pidkova; Yakiv Shah	Peter the Lame

Strength
300 to 1,200	Unknown (Ottoman Empire) 500 to 6,000

Casualties and losses
Unknown	Heavy

The Moldavian Campaign (Note: Ukrainian: Молдавський похід Підкови Romanian: Campania moldovenească a lui Pidkova Turkish: Pidkova'nın Boğdan Seferi) was conducted by the Zaporozhian Cossacks of Ivan Pidkova against the Moldavian ruler Peter the Lame and his Ottoman allies, on 11–29 November 1577.

== Prelude ==
The Moldavian population grew dissatisfied with the rule of Peter the Lame and his pro-Ottoman policy. The Moldavian people saw Ivan Pidkova as a rightful Moldavian royal descendent that could liberate them from the Ottoman rule. In early 1577, Moldavians reportedly invited Pidkova to become a ruler of Moldavia, but Pidkova was unable to get the necessary support during this time for his plan. However, Pidkova later managed to gather 1,000 Cossacks under his command, but only 600 of whom would be able to take part in his planned campaign during November. Other sources give figures of 300 and 1,200 Cossacks.

== Campaign ==
Some Polish Hetmans attempted to warn Peter the Lame about incoming Cossack force, but weren't able to do so on time. On November 11, Cossacks already crossed the river and were in Moldavia. In response, Moldavian ruler sent an army. Cossacks were detected and forced to take cover from shelling. However, the Cossacks managed to take enemies by surprise when they were at close distance and overpowered them. Moldavian ruler was unable to stop Cossacks and fled to Wallachia. On 23/29 of November, Pidkova officially took power in Moldavia.

== Aftermath ==
Despite Pidkova's success, he was unable to get rid of external threats. Peter the Lame in Wallachia reorganized his army and with new Ottoman support invaded Moldavia, but his army was routed by Cossacks through trickery and he was forced to flee again. However, his opponent Stephen Báthory with his Traslavynian ruler brother Komathy Balasz came to oust Pidkova. As a result, Pidkova abandoned Moldavia with his Cossacks before any serious fighting took place. Pidkova's rule in Moldavia was short. In 1578, On June/July 16, Pidkova was captured by Polish-Lithuanian troops and executed in Lviv.
