= Moldavian Campaign (1538) =

- Part of the Moldavian–Ottoman Wars
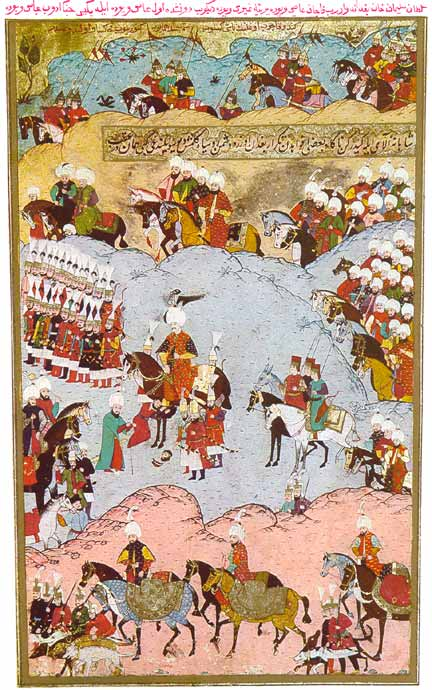
- Sultan Suleiman I taking control of Moldova. Ottoman miniature painting from the Hünername
Date	9 July – October 1538
Location	Moldavia
Result	Ottoman victory

Belligerents
Ottoman Empire; Crimean Khanate	Moldavian Principality; Eastern Hungary

Commanders and leaders
Suleiman I Ayas Mehmed Pasha; Rüstem Pasha; Lütfi Pasha (Crimean Khanate) Sahib I Giray	(Moldavia) Petru Rareș

Strength
240,000 men	70,000 men: 30,000 Moldavians; 40,000 Hungarians

Casualties and losses
Unknown	Unknown

The Moldavian campaign in 1538 was a military expedition led by the Ottoman Sultan Suleiman the Magnificent against the Moldavian prince Petru Rareș. The campaign was an Ottoman success, and Petru was deposed. The Ottomans also captured Suceava, South Bessarabia, and the northern Black Sea coast.

== Background ==
According to Ottoman sources, the voivode of Moldavia, Petru Rareș, began plotting against the Ottomans and attempted to ally with Ferdinand I, Holy Roman Emperor. To obtain independence, the voivode abandoned his loyalty to the Sultan and secretly exchanged letters with Ferdinand. The Sultan kept this military campaign very secret and announced it only at the last moment. He also states that the reason was that the Sultan held Voivode Petru responsible for the killing of Andre Gritti, the Venetian ambassador of Istanbul, who at that time was living in Buda and providing information about Buda to the Sultan.

In addition, a formal reason was the voivode's killing of Muslims living in the Moldavia region and plundering their goods. The voivode reduced the tribute he paid to Istanbul each year, pretended to obey the Sultan, but was in fact rebellious. A concrete reason mentioned was that the voivode did not send 1,000 cavalrymen to the Sultan. Because of these reasons, Suleiman left Istanbul and marched with his army on 9 July 1538.

== Campaign ==
The Sultan marched with an army of 240,000 men, including Crimean Tatars. Suleiman sent his ambassador, Sinan Çavush, to Moldavia, calling Petru to surrender and come to Istanbul. But, nine days later, he reported to Suleiman that Petru refused the offer. Petru had an army of 70,000 men, including 30,000 Moldavians and 40,000 Hungarian men from John Zápolya. Petru, in the mountainous and rocky areas of Moldavia, launched hit-and-run attacks against the Ottoman soldiers, but his forces proved insufficient to resist the Ottomans. Without confronting the Ottoman Army directly, he fled to Transylvania.

The Sultan appointed Mehmed Pasha as commander-in-chief, had a great bridge built over the Danube River, and crossed to the opposite bank. With the Rumelian, Anatolian, and akıncı troops, he entered Moldavia. He reached the banks of the Prut River with his army and crossed it by building a bridge. The Crimean Khan Sahib Giray rendezvoused with Suleiman. The combined armies marched towards Suceava and began besieging the city on September 16. Large iron cannons were cast in front of the fortress. Realizing they could not defend the fortress against the Ottomans, the Moldavians surrendered on the same day and handed over the fortress's keys to the Sultan. The treasures and goods hidden in the fortress fell into the hands of the Ottoman soldiers. The conquest of Suceava was attended by Rüstem Pasha, Lütfi Pasha, and Mehmed Pasha.

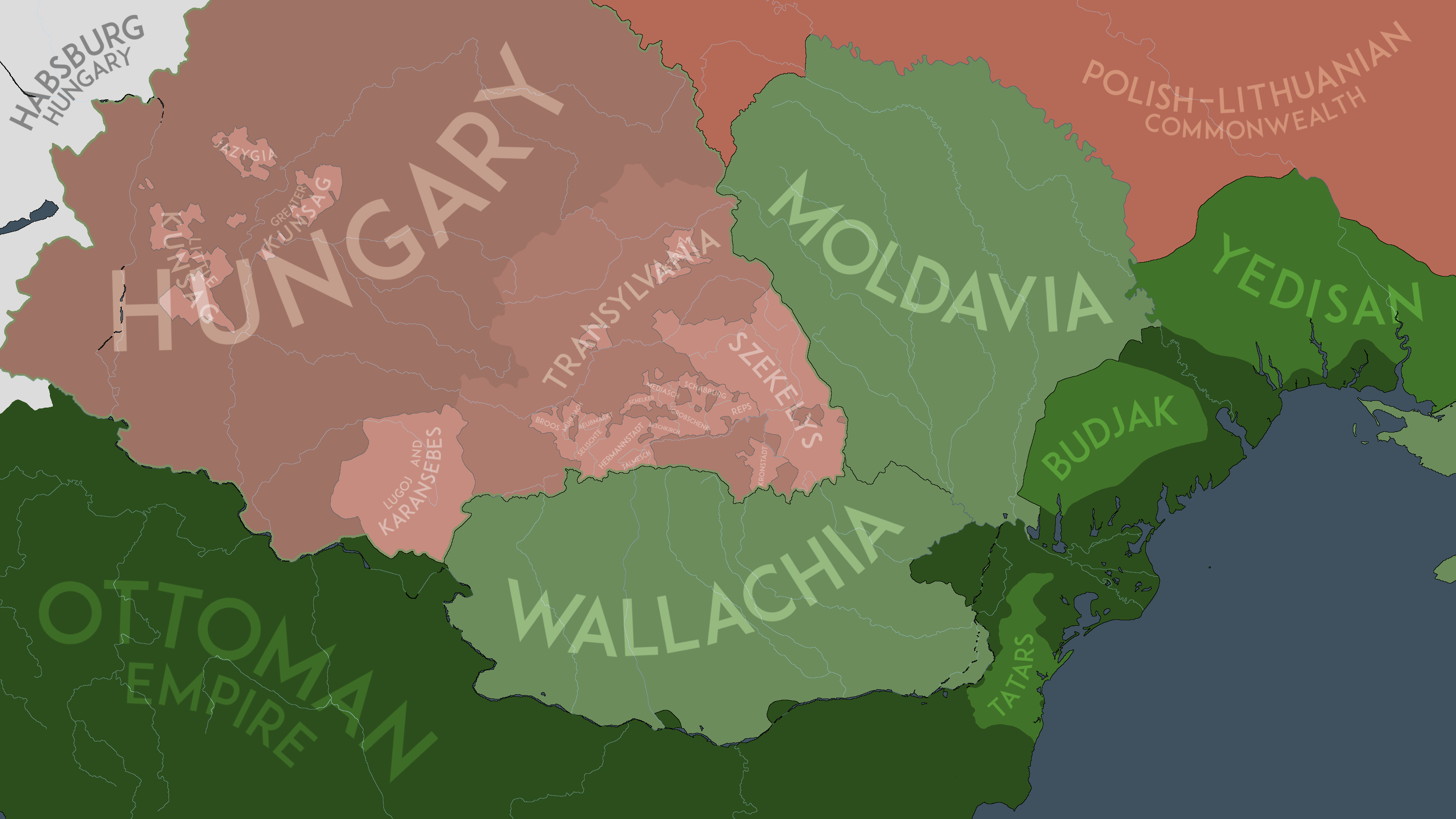
The Aftermath of the Ottoman campaign in 1538

After this conquest, the lords and voivodes of the Moldavia region came to Suleiman's imperial tent and submitted. One of their own was appointed voivode by the Sultan, whose name was Stephan Locust. During the campaign, the Ottomans annexed Southern Bessarabia, the coast of the Northern Black Sea, and Tighina. The Ottomans concluded the campaign in October of the same year.

== Sources ==
- Kenneth M. Setton (1984), The Papacy and the Levant, 1204–1571. Vol III.
- Viorel Panaite (2019), Ottoman Law of War and Peace, The Ottoman Empire and Its Tribute-Payers from the North of the Danube. Second Revised Edition.
- Caroline Finkel (2012), Osman's Dream.
- Mehmet Akif Erdoğru (2016), An Agenda of the Ottoman Expedition by Suleiman the Magnificent against the Castle of Suceava in 1538.
