= Moldavian–Ottoman Wars =

Wars between Moldavia and Ottoman Empire

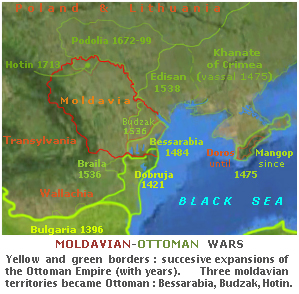
Date	1420–1538 (main phase)
Location	Moldavia, Wallachia, Transylvania (present-day Moldova, Romania Ukraine)
Result	Ottoman victory; 1420: Moldavian victory; 1443–1444: Ottoman victory; 1471–1474: Indecisive; 1475–1476: Moldavian victory; 1477–1481: Indecisive; 1484–1486: Ottoman victory; 1498–1500: Moldavian victory; 1538: Ottoman victory
Territorial changes	Moldavia becomes an Ottoman tributary state for more than three centuries

Belligerents
Moldavia Supported by: Kingdom of Hungary Kingdom of Poland Wallachia (pro-Moldavian faction)	Ottoman Empire Supported by: Crimean Khanate Nogai Tatars Wallachia (pro-Ottoman faction)

Commanders and leaders
Alexander I Stephen II; Stephen III; Petru Rareș	(Ottoman Empire) Mehmed I (Ottoman Empire) Mehmed II (Ottoman Empire) Bayazid II (Ottoman Empire) Suleiman I

Strength
Varied greatly during the centuries: ~20,000 active – 60,000	Varied greatly during the centuries: Capable of raising more than 100,000

The first conflict between Moldavia and the Ottoman Empire for which there is a historical account occurred during the reign of Alexandru cel Bun, in 1420, when the Ottomans tried to capture Chilia. The attack was unsuccessful.

In 1439, King Sigismund of Hungary argued with King Wladislaw of Poland about dividing Moldavia between their two countries. Sigismund complained that the Moldavians refused to aid him in his expeditions against the Turks, but King Wladyslaw argued that the Moldavians couldn't aid Sigismund with troops because they aided him, instead, and Sigismund had to give up on his claims.

In 1444, Moldavia sent troops that joined King Władysław III of Varna at the Battle of Varna, which was part of the broader Crusade of Varna. According to Jan Długosz, the Turks had camels with them and in case of defeat, they would spill gold and silver coins on the ground in order to slacken the enemy. The Moldavians went after the camels for the money. The Crusade ultimately ended in failure.

Between 1451 and 1457, Moldavia was in civil turmoil and under Petru Aron, the principality paid the Porte an annual tribute of 2,000 gold coins. In 1470, during the rule of Stephen the Great, the relationship between Moldavia and the Porte became hostile, and resulted in several confrontations. In 1471, Stephen invaded Ottoman Wallachia. The Moldavian incursions into Wallachia lasted until 1475, sparking the invasion of Moldavia. In the Battle of Vaslui, the Ottomans were heavily defeated, while in the Battle of Valea Albă, Sultan Mehmed II was victorious, but was forced to retreat after an unsuccessful Siege of Neamț Citadel. Stephen would launch further campaigns into Wallachia and even crush Wallachian-Ottoman forces at the Battle of Râmnic in 1481, but the campaign overall would prove to be indecisive, and Stephen would change his strategy to defense.

In 1484, the Ottomans launched another invasion of Moldavia, managing to annex Chilia and Cetatea Albă. In 1486, Stephen accepted Ottoman suzerainty.

In 1498, as the Ottoman army was returning from Polish lands with loot, they were defeated by Moldavians near Botoșani. Stephen stops paying tribute to the Porte. On 5 January 1499, Ottomans were again routed, this time at the Prut river crossing. In 1500, Stephen ordered to set Chilia and Cetatea Albă on fire in order to undermine Ottoman influence over Moldavia.

After the death of Stephen the Great, 1504, Moldavia fell into decline and was forced to accept vassalage for the Porte in 1512, suffering its final invasion during the main phase in 1538. However, the conflicts continued to rage until the 19th century, giving the country brief periods of independence, such as at the Battle of Jiliște in 1574 and during the Cossack campaigns into Moldavia in 1594–1595.

== Bibliography ==
- Długosz, Jan. "The Annals of Jan Długosz" ISBN 1-901019-00-4
