= Cığalazade Yusuf Sinan Pasha =

Grand Vizier of the Ottoman Empire (1596)

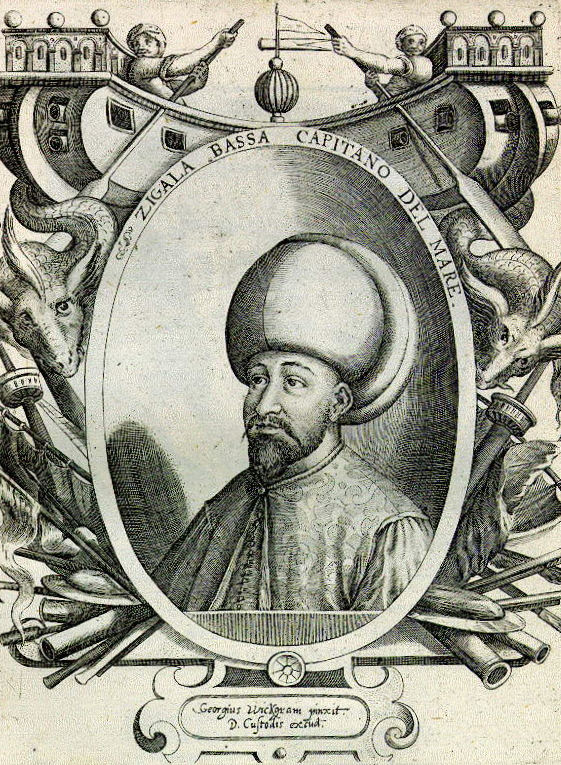

Kapudan Pasha
- In office 1590–1595
- Monarch: Murad III
- Preceded by: Kılıç Ali Pasha
- Succeeded by: Halil Pasha

Grand Vizier of the Ottoman Empire
- In office 27 October 1596 – 5 December 1596
- Monarch: Mehmed III
- Preceded by: Ibrahim Pasha
- Succeeded by: Ibrahim Pasha

Kapudan Pasha
- In office 1599–1601
- Monarch: Mehmed III
- Preceded by: Halil Pasha
- Succeeded by: Mustafa Pasha

Personal details
- Born: 1545 Messina, Kingdom of Sicily
- Died: 1606 (aged 60–61) Diyarbakir, Ottoman Empire
- Spouses: Saliha Hanımsultan (m. 1576; died 1580) Safiye Hanımsultan (m. 1581)
- Children: by Saliha; Mahmud Pasha; Ayşe Hanım by Safiye; Mehmed Bey; Hüseyn Bey; Fülane Hanım

Cığalazade Yusuf Sinan Pasha (also known as Cağaloğlu Yusuf Sinan Pasha; c. 1545–1605), his epithet meaning "son of Cicala", was an Ottoman Italian statesman who held the office of Grand Vizier for forty days between 27 October to 5 December 1596, during the reign of Mehmed III. He was also a Kapudan Pasha (Grand Admiral of the Ottoman Navy) as well as a military general. He was one of the most capable statesmen of the Ottoman Classical Age, having contributed to the eastwards expansion of the empire at the expense of Persia and successfully defended Ottoman Hungary from Habsburg invasion. However, because of court intricacies, he resigned from the Vizierate after just over a month in office.

== Early life ==
He was born as Scipione Cicala in Messina around 1545, as a member of the aristocratic Genoese family of Cicala. His younger brother was Carlo Cicala. His father, a Viscount (di Cicala), was, according to Stephan Gerlach, a corsair in the service of Spain, while his mother is said to have been a Turk from Castelnuovo (Herceg Novi today). The Visconte and his son, captured at the Battle of Djerba by the Ottoman navy in 1560 or 1561, were taken first to Tripoli in North Africa and then to Constantinople. The father was in due course ransomed from captivity and, after living for some time at Beyoğlu (Pera), returned to Messina, where he died in 1564. His son, Scipione, was not released, but was inducted into the Ottoman corps of young boys to be trained for imperial service. He converted, as was required, to Islam and was trained in the Imperial palace, rising to the rank of silahtar. He married two great-granddaughters of Suleiman I and found himself assured of wealth, high office and protection at the Porte.

== Political career ==
As an army commander, he distinguished himself in the battle of Lake Cahul during the suppression of the uprising in Moldavia. He became Agha of the Janissaries in 1575 and retained this office until 1578. During the next phase of his career he saw much active service in the long Ottoman–Persian war of 1578–1590. He was beylerbey (governor-general) of Van in 1583, and assumed command, in the same year, of the great fortress of Erivan, being raised to the rank of vizier at the same time. He also played a prominent role, once more as Beylerley of Van, in the campaign of 1585 against Tabriz. As Beylerbey of Bayazıt, an appointment which he received in 1586, he fought with success in western Persia during the last years of the war, bringing Nihavand and Hamadan under Ottoman control.

After the peace of 1590, he was made governor of Erzurum, and in 1591, became Kapudan Pasha or Grand Admiral of the Ottoman fleet. He held this office until 1595. During the third Grand Vizierate (1593–1595) of Koca Sinan Pasha he was promoted to Fourth Vizier. At that time, the Ottomans had been at war with Austria since 1593. Cağaloğlu Yusuf Sinan Pasha, by then appointed Third Vizier, accompanied Sultan Mehmed III on the Hungarian campaign of 1596. He tried in vain to relieve the fortress of Hatvan, which fell in September 1596. He was present at the successful Ottoman siege of Eger (Eğri) (September–October 1596) and at the Battle of Mezö-Keresztes in October 1596 and took part in the final assault that turned an imminent defeat into a notable triumph for the Ottomans. In reward for his services, he was made Grand Vizier, but the discontent arising from the measures which he used in an effort to restore discipline amongst the Ottoman forces, the troubles which followed his intervention in the affairs of the Crimean Tatars, and the existence at court of powerful influences eager to restore Damat İbrahim Pasha to the Grand Vizierate, brought about his deposition from this office after 40 days.

He was Beylerbey of Damascus from December 1597 to January 1598. In May 1599, he was made Kapudan Pasha for the second time. In 1604, he assumed command of the eastern front, where a new war between the Ottomans and the Persians had broken out in the preceding year. His campaign of 1605 was unsuccessful, the forces he led towards Tabriz suffering defeat near the shore of Lake Urmia. Cağaloğlu had to withdraw to the fortress of Van and thence in the direction of Diyarbekir. He died in the course of this retreat in December 1605. He is the ancestor of İlhan İrem, who was a famous Turkish pop singer.

== Marriages and issue ==
He married two great-granddaughters of Sultan Suleiman I. The two girls were daughters of Ayşe Hümaşah Sultan, the daughter of Mihrimah Sultan, the only daughter of Sultan Suleiman I, born to his legal wife Hürrem Sultan.

- In October 1576 he married Saliha Hanımsultan, who died in 1580. They had a son and a daughter:
  - Cağaloğlu Mahmud Pasha (died in 1643). On 10 February 1612 he married Hatice Sultan, a daughter of Sultan Mehmed III (Suleiman I's great-grandson). After her death in 1613, he married her half-sister Hümaşah Sultan in October 1613.
  - Ayşe Hanım. She married her maternal uncle Sultanzade Abdurrahman Bey and was mother of Semiz Mehmed Pasha.
- In March 1581, after Saliha's death, he married her younger sister Safiye Hanımsultan. They had two sons and a daughter:
  - Mehmed Bey. He married a daughter of Murad III;
  - Hüseyn Bey;
  - Fülane Hanım.

== Legacy ==
The Cağaloğlu quarter in Istanbul, a household name in Turkey for having been the equivalent of London's Fleet Street as the city's press center, and where Yusuf Sinan Pasha had constructed a palace and a hamam (Turkish bathhouse), is named after him and carries his name to this day. The bath, known as Cağaloğlu Hamam after the Pasha, was reconstructed in 1741.

The song "Sinàn Capudàn Pascià" by the Genoese singer-songwriter Fabrizio De André tells the story of Sinan Pasha. It is completely in Genoese dialect and is part of the album Crêuza de mä.

== See also ==
- List of Ottoman grand viziers
- List of Kapudan Pashas
- Cağaloğlu, Istanbul
- Cağaloğlu Hamam
- Palazzo Cicala

== Notes ==
Political offices
Preceded by Damat Ibrahim Pasha	Grand Vizier of the Ottoman Empire; 17 October 1596 – 5 December 1596	Succeeded by Damat Ibrahim Pasha
