= Ivan Pidkova (poem) =

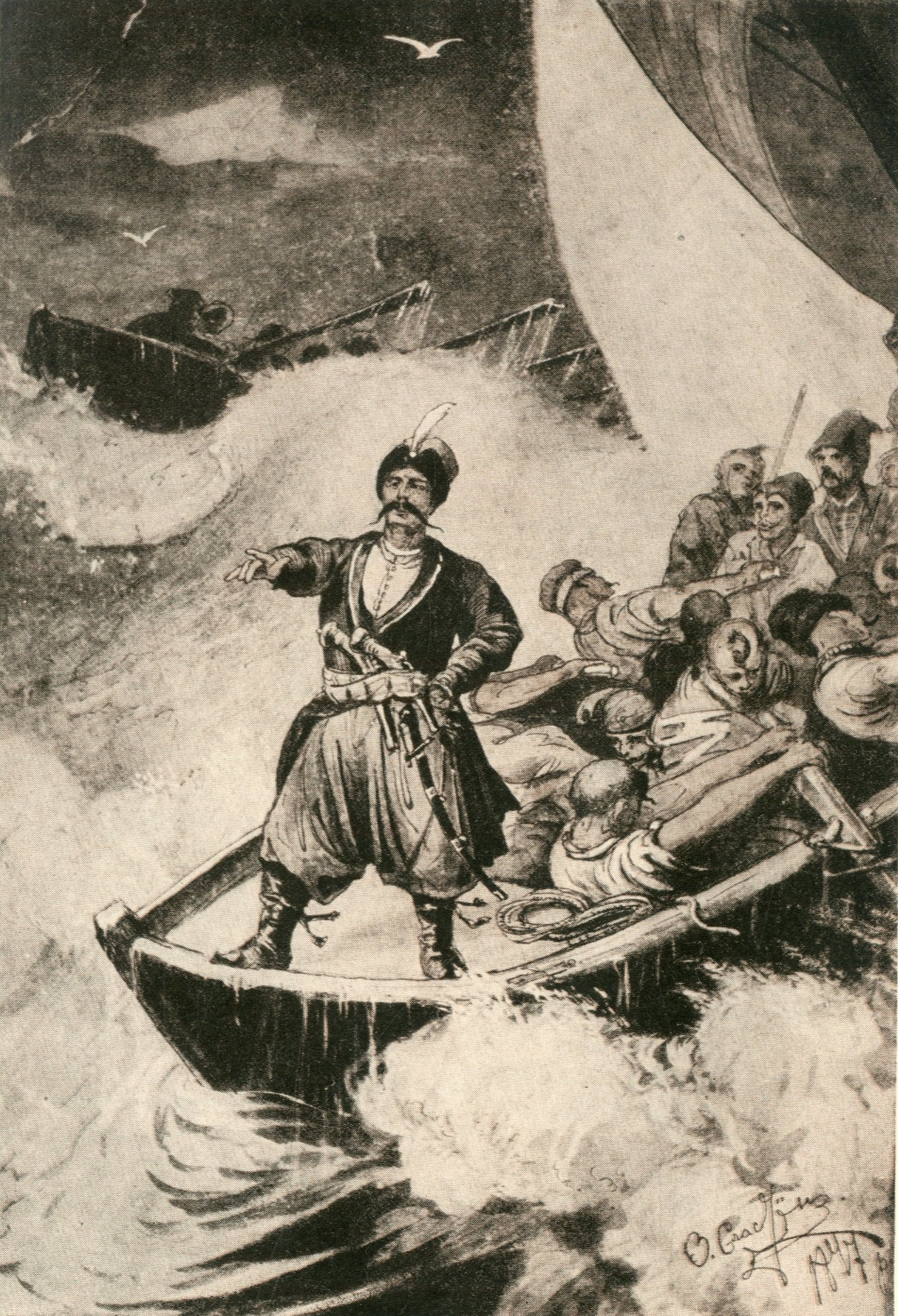
Ivan Pidkova leading his Cossacks against Constantinople in an illustration to the poem by Opanas Slastion

Ivan Pidkova (Ukrainian: Іван Підкова) is an early poem by Ukrainian author Taras Shevchenko, written approximately in 1839 in Saint Petersburg. It was first printed in 1840 in Shevchenko's Kobzar. The poem presents a fictionalized depiction of Zaporozhian Cossacks under the leadership of Ivan Pidkova.

== History ==
The work was dedicated to Shevchenko's friend, Russian painter Vasily Sternberg. The author's inspiration in writing a poem dedicated to Cossack campaigns probably came from historical works by Izmail Sreznevsky and Dmytro Bantysh-Kamensky, History of Ruthenians, Description of Ukraine by Guillaume Le Vasseur de Beauplan, works of fiction such as Taras Bulba by Nikolai Gogol, stories by Mykola Kostomarov and Michał Czajkowski, as well as Ukrainian folk dumas. After Shevchenko's return from exile, in 1859 he created a new version of the poem with some edits and a different name, but it was not allowed to be printed by authorities.

== Plot ==
The poem is opened with a panorama of Ukrainian history from Cossack era and into the times of the author's life. Shevchenko contrasts the freedom and glory enjoyed by Cossacks of the past with the contemporary state of Ukraine, whose population was enserfed under Russian rule. The main part of the poem describes a naval campaign led by otaman Pidkova against the Ottoman Empire, during which Cossack boats exited the Dnieper estuary and moved towards Constantinople. This depiction is anachronistic, as there is no historical proof, that Pidkova ever took part in Cossack raids on the sea.

== Legacy ==
Under Shevchenko's influence, poems dedicated to Ivan Pidkova were created by a number of Ukrainian authors, including Sydir Vorobkevych and Ivan Drach. A Romanian translation of Shevchenko's poem was made by Mihail Sadoveanu, who also wrote his own works about Pidkova.
