= Iancu Sasul =

Prince of Moldavia
- Reign: 21 November 1579 – September 1582
- Predecessor: Peter the Lame
- Successor: Peter the Lame
- Born: unknown
- Died: 28 September 1582; Lviv
- Issue: Bogdan Sasul, Chrisotina
- Dynasty: Bogdan-Mușat
- Father: Petru Rareș
- Religion: Orthodox

Iancu Sasul (John the Saxon) or Ioan Vodă V (Voivode John V; died 28 September 1582) was the bastard son of Petru Rareş from his relationship with the wife of Braşov Transylvanian Saxon Iorg (Jürgen) Weiss, and Prince of Moldavia between November 1579 and September 1582.

== Bid for the throne ==
Let in on the secret of his lineage by his mother, Iancu renounced the inheritance of his stepfamily and moved to Istanbul, in order to bid for his father's throne. Marrying into the Palaeologus family of former Byzantine Emperors (to Maria), and taking advantage of the weakened position of Moldavian Prince Petru Şchiopul, he borrowed money from Venetian former Dragoman and high dignitary (sfetnic) of Petru Şchiopul Bartolomeo Brutti, and managed to gain the office. Iancu also benefited from the influence that his half-sister, Doamna Chiajna (the widow of Wallachian Prince Mircea Ciobanul and mother of Petru cel Tânăr), exercised on Ottoman authorities.

== Reign ==
The Prince's reign was marked by excessive and highly inventive taxing, motivated by the increasing debt and his ambition to accumulate a sizable personal fortune on the side. Iancu was to go down in history as the mind behind the much-hated văcărit tax, whereby every tenth head of cattle was confiscated by the state (vacă is Romanian for "cow").

Brutti became part of the retinue and was placed in charge of finances. His privileged position angered Chiajna, and she took to undermining Iancu's standing, forming an alliance with disgruntled boyars. What added to Iancu's isolation were his privileged contacts with the Holy Roman Empire, presumably entertained in order to offer a safe haven in case of need. When he received news of the Porte's intent to depose him, Iancu fled the country, carrying an immense fortune that was said to fit in 100 carts (of which 40 would have been filled with currency alone). He attempted to take refuge on newly-bought estates in Transylvania, but he was arrested on his passage through Poland and decapitated in Lviv.

Iancu Sasul fathered a son, Bogdan Sasul (mentioned in 1596), and two daughters: Chrisotina (married to a certain Antonios Katakalos) and Maria (married to the Venetian nobleman Giovanni Zane).

Preceded by Petru Şchiopul	Prince/Voivode of Moldavia; 1579–1582	Succeeded by Petru Şchiopul
