= Istanbul Governor's Office =

Building in Cagaloglu, Turkey

- İstanbul Vilayet Konağı
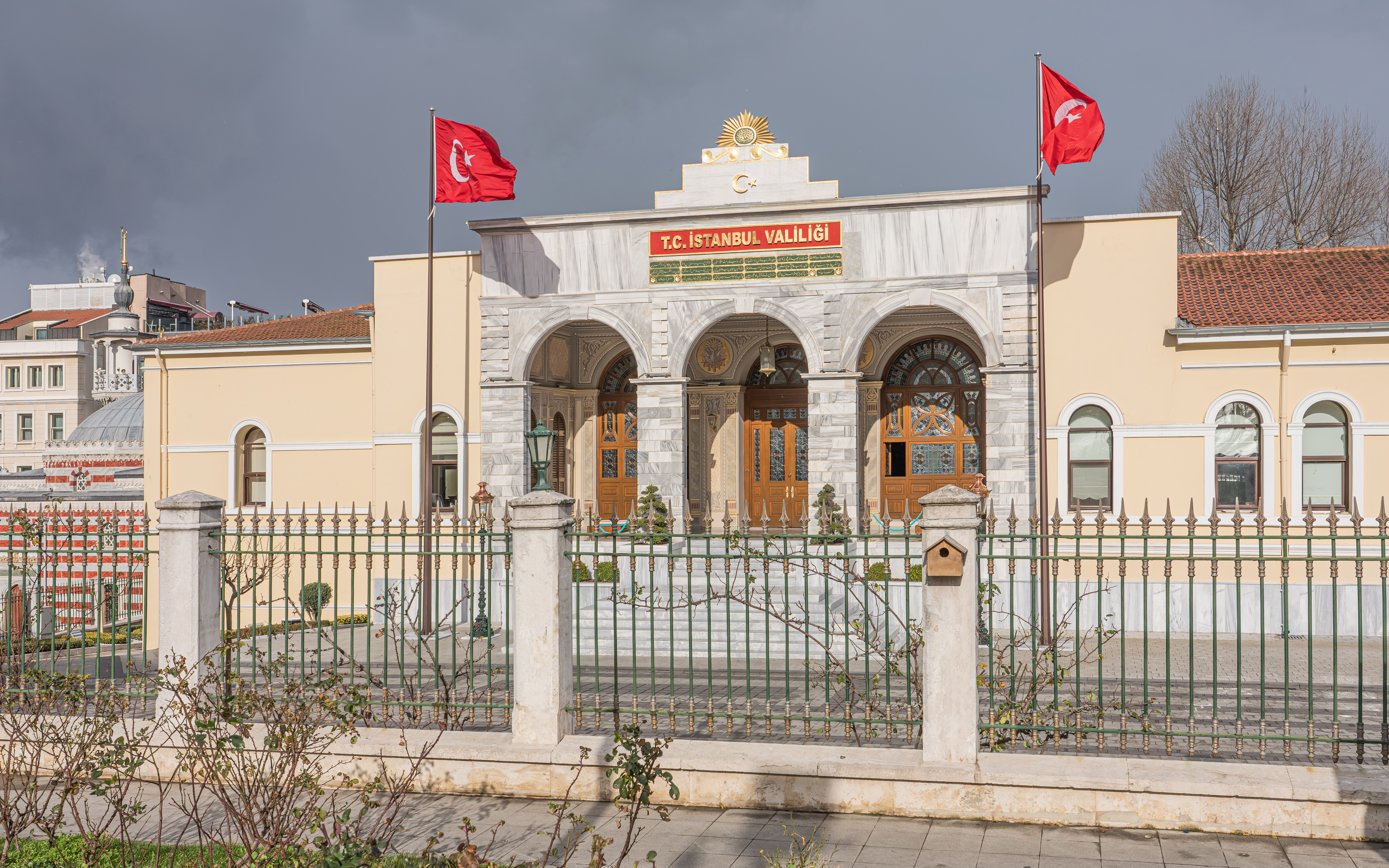

- Location within Istanbul Fatih

General information
- Location: Cağaloğlu, Fatih, Istanbul, Turkey
- Coordinates: 41°00′43″N 28°58′34″E
- Completed: 1756; 270 years ago

Istanbul Governor's Office (Turkish: İstanbul Vilayet Konağı) is the seat of the governor of Istanbul province. It is located at Cağaloğlu quarter of Fatih district of Istanbul, Turkey. It was the headquarters of the Ottoman government, called the Sublime Porte, until the establishment of the Republic.

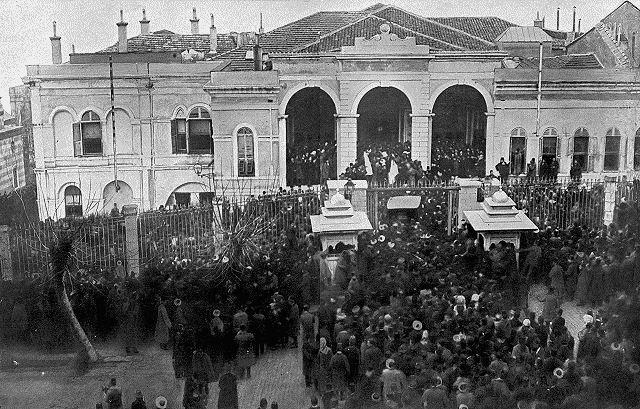
Sublime Porte building during the 1913 Ottoman coup d'état.
