= Ivan Pidkova =

Hetman of Ukrainian Cossacks

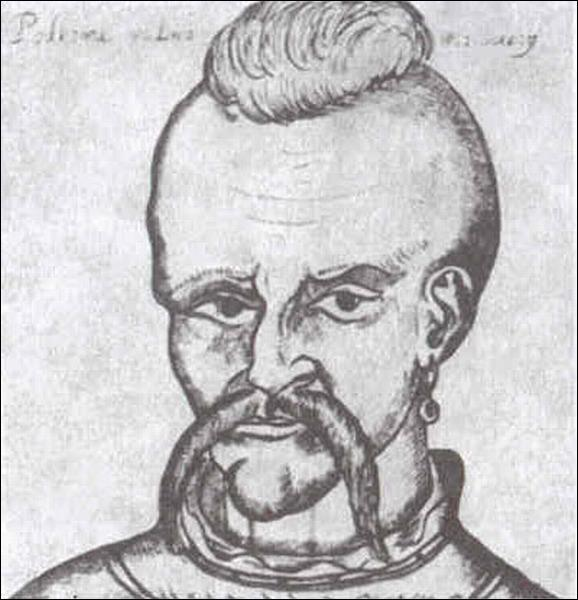
- The only known portrait of Ivan Pidkova, printed in Polish album in the 17th century

Prince of Moldavia
- Reign: November – December 1577
- Predecessor: Peter the Lame
- Successor: Peter the Lame
- Born: Unknown
- Died: 16 June 1578
- Religion: Eastern Orthodox

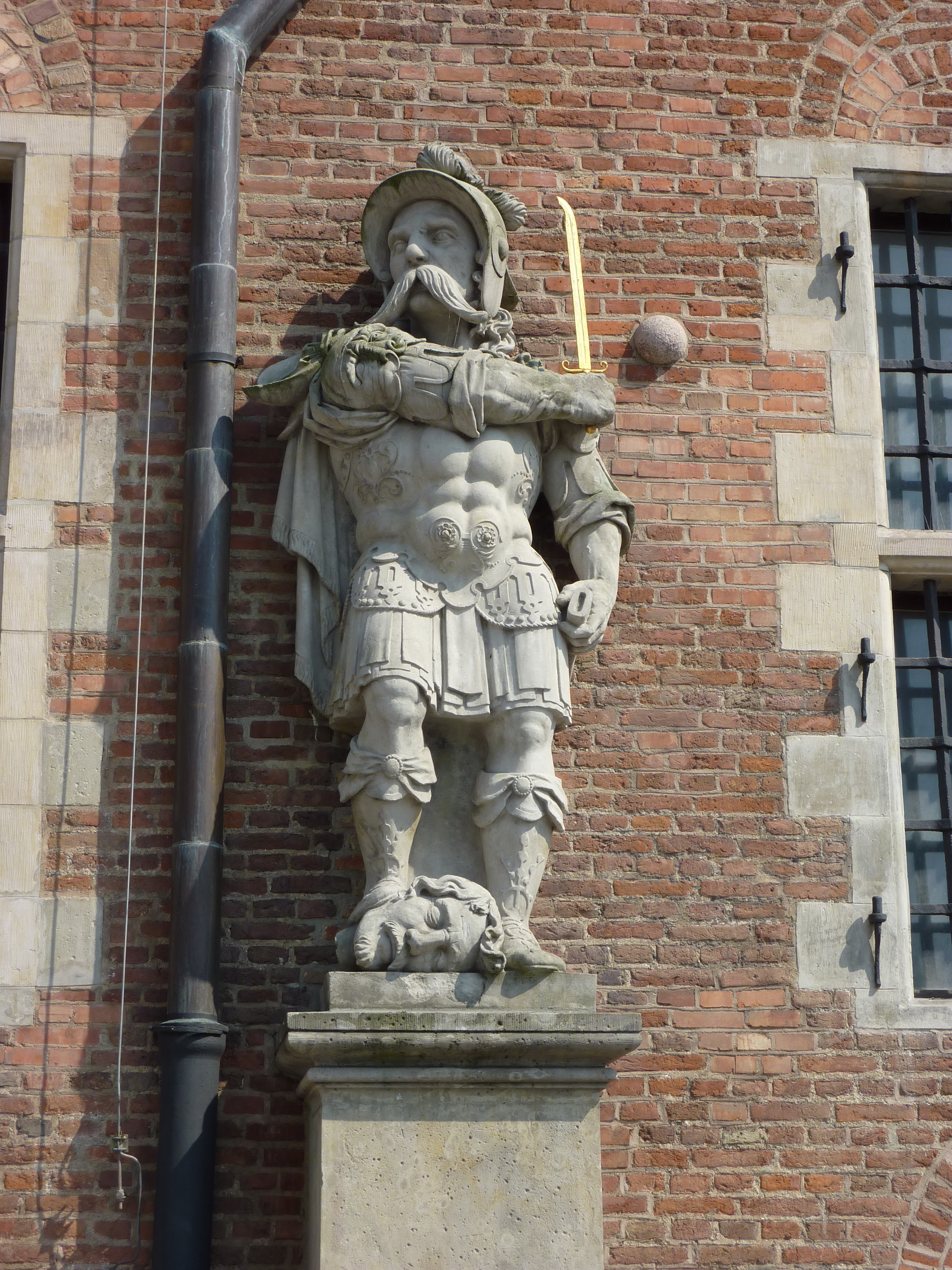
Cossack with a head of Ioan Potcoavă, baroque sculpture from Great Armoury in Gdańsk

Ivan Pidkova (Ukrainian: Іван Підкова) or Ioan Potcoavă (died 16 June 1578), also known as Ioan Crețul, and Nicoară Potcoavă among Romanians, was a prominent Registered Cossack campaign otaman, and short-time ruler of Moldavia (November–December 1577). His moniker ("pidkova" in Ukrainian/"potcoavă" in Romanian – "horseshoe") is said to originate in the fact that he used to ride his stallions to the point of breaking off their horseshoes; another version says that he could break and unbend both horseshoes and coins with his fists. He is perhaps best known as the protagonist of Taras Shevchenko's poem Ivan Pidkova (1840). Celebrated as a Ukrainian hero he led the Moldavian and Ukrainian struggle against Turkish domination. During his Moldavian campaign in November 1577, Pidkova temporarily took power in Moldavia.

== Biography ==
His ethnic origins are not known, but he is generally regarded as of Ukrainian ethnicity. However, Paul Robert Magocsi states he was a Ukrainian Cossack of Romanian origin. More broadly, Pidkova was a "Kozak otaman who led the Moldavian and Ukrainian struggle against the Turks." After rising to prominence as a successful soldier, he became a leader (Otaman) and the sworn brother of hetman Yakiv Shah, elected by the Cossacks of the Registered Zaporozhian Host from Ukraine neighbouring Moldavia. In 1574, Ioan Vodă cel Cumplit, whose brother Pidkova claimed to be, had named the territory "Our Country from over the Dniester". Other Moldavian Atamans and Hetmans of the Cossacks were Grigore Lobodă (Hryhoriy Loboda; 1593–1596) and Dănilă Apostol (Danylo Apostol; 1727–1734).

Pidkova was one of the so-called Domnișori ("Little Princes"), named so because of a more or less based claims of belonging to Moldavian ruling families, thus exercising demands of the throne. Claiming to be Ioan III Vodă's half-brother, he together with Hetman Yakiv Shah chased Peter the Lame from the throne and resisted the first wave of violent Ottoman reaction. The Turks, their Wallachian vassal Mihnea Turcitul and their Transylvania vassal and Polish partner, King Stefan Báthory, managed to remove him. In the end, Pidkova was taken prisoner by Poles and decapitated in Lviv.

== Legacy ==
He is the hero of Taras Shevchenko's romantic 1839 poem Ivan Pidkova, in which, Shevchenko "lets his mind travel over the Ukrainian past," expressing his admiration for the Ukrainian Cossacks. Among other works dedicated to the otaman is Romanian writer Mihail Sadoveanu's socialist realist 1952 novel Nicoară Potcoavă, as well as several Cossack ballads. His monument is placed on one of the small central squares in Lviv, Ukraine.

== Sources ==
- Grigore Ureche, Letopisețul Țării Moldovei

Preceded by Petru Șchiopul	Prince/Voivode of Moldavia; 1577	Succeeded by Petru Șchiopul
