= Cağaloğlu Hamam =

Turkish bath in Istanbul, Turkey

Coordinates: 41.0106°N 28.9756°E

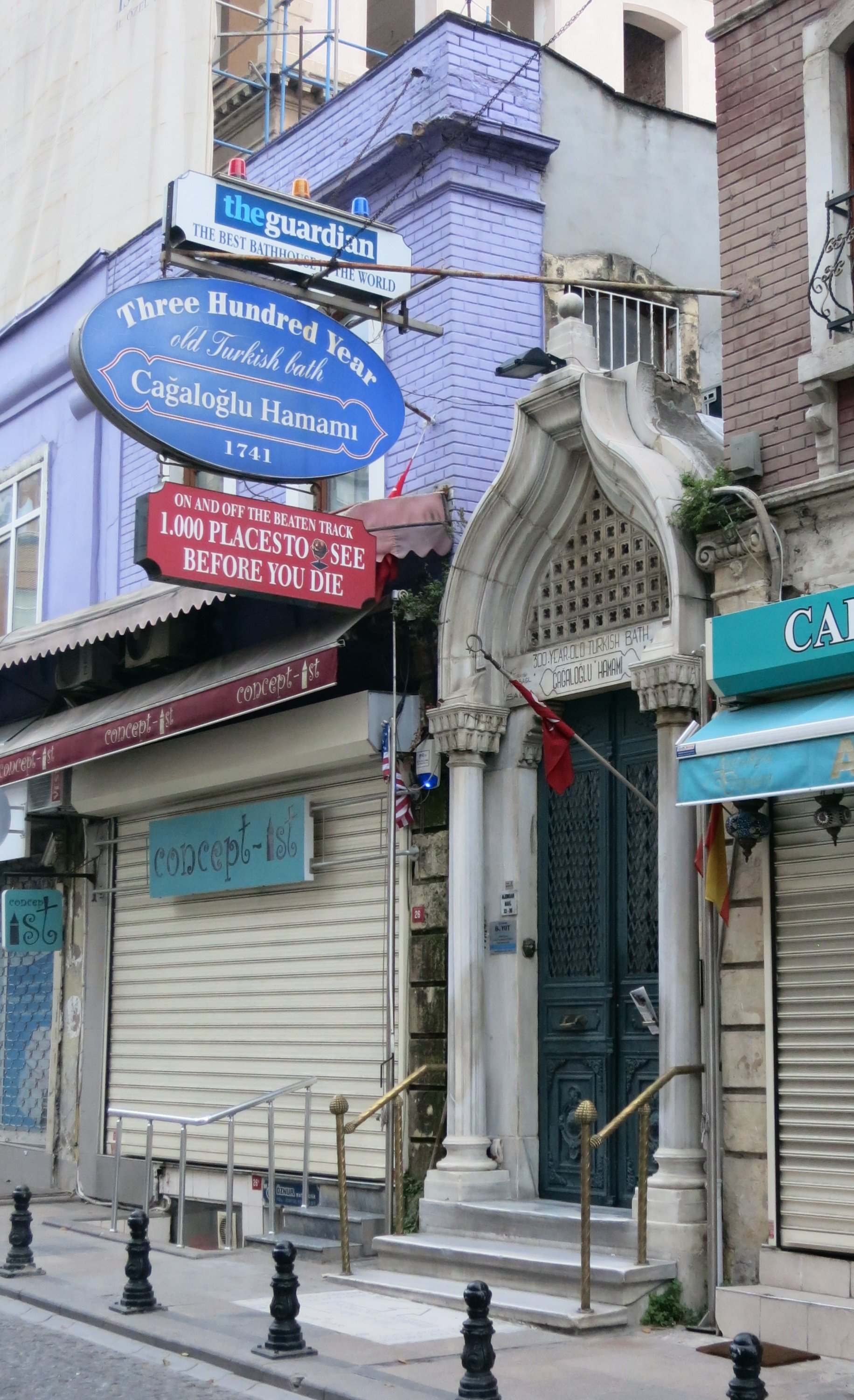
Main entrance of the Cağaloğlu Hamam

The Cağaloğlu Hamam is a historic hamam (bathhouse) in Sultanahmet, in the heart of the historic centre of Istanbul, Turkey. Finished in 1741, it was one of the last major hamams to be built in Constantinople/Istanbul during the Ottoman period. It was built to raise revenue for the library of Sultan Mahmud I, situated inside the Ayasofya Mosque, and was begun by one of the head architects of that time, Suleyman Ağa, then completed by Abdullah Ağa.

Cağaloğlu is a double hamam with separate sections for men and women. The layout follows the long-established traditional form for hamams, though the architectural details and decoration reflect the later Ottoman Baroque style of the 18th century.

This was a particularly well-known hamam visited by many famous individuals including the nursing pioneer Florence Nightingale, Turkey's first president Mustafa Kemal Atatürk, King Edward VIII of the UK, Kaiser Wilhelm II of Germany, Turkish rock star Barış Manço, actors Harrison Ford and John Travolta, model Kate Moss and ballet star Rudolf Nureyev, among others. Today its clientele is almost entirely made up of tourists.
