= John III the Terrible =

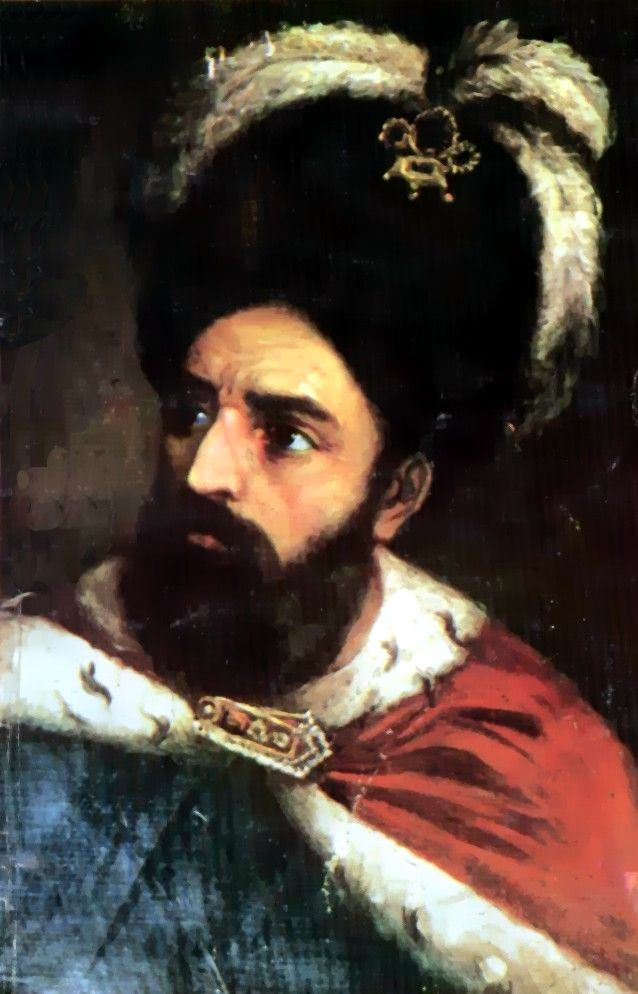

Prince of Moldavia
- Reign: February 1572 – June 1574
- Predecessor: Bogdan IV of Moldavia
- Successor: Peter the Lame
- Born: 1521
- Died: 14 June 1574 (aged 52–53); Roșcani
- Dynasty: Bogdan-Mușat
- Father: Stephen IV of Moldavia
- Mother: Serpega
- Religion: Eastern Orthodox

John III the Terrible (Romanian: Ioan Vodă cel Cumplit), also John III the Brave (Romanian: Ioan cel Viteaz; 1521 – June 14, 1574) was Voivode of Moldavia between February 1572 and June 1574. Dimitrie Cantemir mentions him under the name John the Armenian.

He was the grandson of Bogdan III and the son of Stephen IV and his Armenian mistress Serpega. It is said he spent part of his life being a merchant in Constantinople, where he had closely studied the Ottomans and their weaknesses.

Ioan was one of the last medieval Romanian rulers to battle the Ottoman Turks. His nickname "the Terrible" was a result of his harsh treatment of the Boyars, the Moldavian nobility, which at that time were very influential in deciding the rulers of the small principality. Attempting to strengthen his rule and make an example out of disloyal nobles, Ioan III carried out several Boyar executions, thus earning his alias "the Terrible". The common people appreciated his courageous stand against the nobility's corruption and the harsh Turkish domination. He refused to double the amount of tribute paid to the Ottomans and defeated the Ottomans at the Battle of Jiliște, but the Moldovan army was defeated in the Battle of the Cahul (1574), he was captured and executed.

His short reign was marked by fierce combat against the Ottoman Empire and their Crimean Tatar allies. In order to counter the power of the Ottomans, he allied himself with the Ukrainian Cossacks. He was victorious at the battles of Jiliște, the Siege of Brăila, Tighina and Cetatea Albă. When an army of 150,000 Turks was sent against him, he personally surrendered, being promised that his Moldavian soldiers and Cossack allies would be spared in exchange for his capture. He was killed by the Ottomans by tying his body to four camels, which were driven in different directions. His soldiers were nonetheless slaughtered mercilessly.

== See also ==
Ancestors of John III the Terrible

16. Alexander I of Moldavia
8. Bogdan II of Moldavia
4. Stephen III of Moldavia
9. Oltea
2. Bogdan III of Moldavia
20. Vlad II Dracul
10. Radu cel Frumos
5. Maria Voichița
1. John III the Terrible
3. (illegitimate) Serpega

Preceded by Bogdan Lăpușneanu	Ruler of Moldavia; 1572–1574	Succeeded by Petru Şchiopul
