= Slobozia Ciorăști =

- Commune
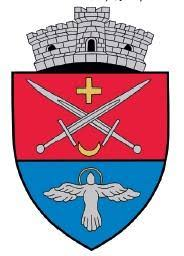
- Coat of arms

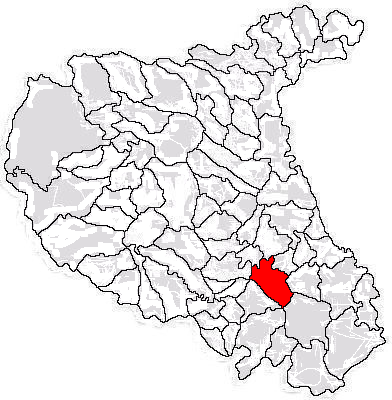
- Location in Vrancea County

- Location in Romania
- Coordinates: 45°37′N 27°12′E
- Country: Romania
- County: Vrancea

Government
  - Mayor (2024–2028): Elena Gîrneață (PSD)
- Area: 78 km^{2} (30 sq mi)
- Elevation: 48 m (157 ft)
- Population (2021-12-01): 1,660
  - Density: 21/km^{2} (55/sq mi)
- Time zone: EET/EEST (UTC+2/+3)
- Postal code: 627315
- Area code: +(40) 237
- Vehicle reg.: VN
- Website: www.primariasloboziaciorasti.ro

Slobozia Ciorăști is a commune located in Vrancea County, Romania. It is composed of three villages: Armeni, Jiliște, and Slobozia Ciorăști.

Historical population
Year	Pop.	±%
2002	2,095	—
2011	1,699	−18.9%
2021	1,660	−2.3%
Source: Census data
