= Peter the Lame =

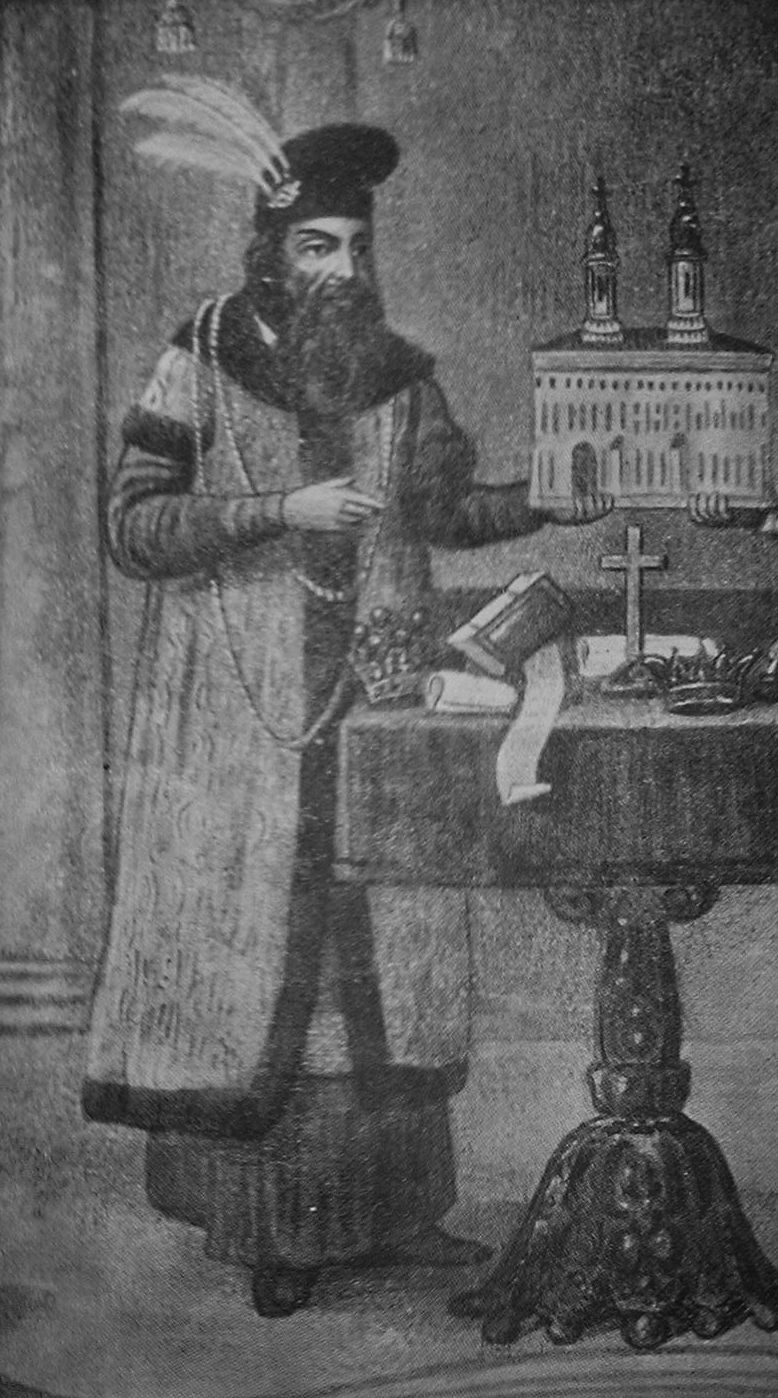

Prince of Moldavia (1st reign)
- Reign: June 1574 – 23 November 1577
- Predecessor: John III the Terrible
- Successor: Ioan Potcoavă

Prince of Moldavia (2nd reign)
- Reign: 1 January 1578 – 21 November 1579
- Predecessor: Ioan Potcoavă
- Successor: Iancu Sasul

Prince of Moldavia (3rd reign)
- Reign: 17 October 1582 – 29 August 1591
- Predecessor: Iancu Sasul
- Successor: Aaron the Tyrant
- Born: 1534
- Died: 1 July 1594 (aged 59–60); Bolzano
- Spouse: Maria Amirali; Irina the Gypsy (one son)
- Issue: Maria; Ștefanița
- House: Drăculeşti
- Father: Mircea III Dracul
- Mother: Maria Despina
- Religion: Orthodox

Peter V the Lame (Romanian: Petru Șchiopul; 1534 – 1 July 1594) was Prince of Moldavia from June 1574 to 23 November 1577. He also ruled 1 January 1578 to 21 November 1579 and 17 October 1583 to 29 August 1591. He was known as "the Lame" due to a physical deformity. Raised by the Turks in Constantinople, he hardly knew of his country of origin before gaining the throne of Moldavia.

== Voivode of Moldavia ==
Anxious to rule like his brother Alexandru II Mircea, Petru was elected prince of Moldavia in 1574. However, unlike most of his ancestors, he was a weak prince and eventually gave up the throne in order to live comfortably in the west.

== Family life ==
His first marriage to Maria Amiralis from Rhodes, was already arranged in his childhood, but later failed. They had one daughter, Maria, who married Peter Bornemisza de Kápolna. Petru soon fell in love with a Roma girl named Irina who became his mistress during his first marriage. Marriage to a Roma slave at that time was impossible. He had Irina freed from slavery and baptized, nicknaming her "Botezata" (the Baptized). After he gave up the throne, together they moved to the city of Bolzano in present-day Italy's Tyrol. Sadly for Irina, Peter soon fell in love with a seductive Circassian named Maria, a lady-in-waiting at his mini-court in exile. Irina died at 25 and was buried in a small cemetery in Bolzano. Their son Ștefăniță never ruled in Moldavia. He was raised as a Catholic and placed in a Jesuit seminary in Innsbruck. He was known to be an obedient student, but died of tuberculosis in 1602. He is buried beside his parents in Bolzano.

== Death ==
Two years after the death of Irina, Peter died of syphilis. He is laid to rest beside her and on his tombstone is the inscription: "I, Prince Peter, descendant of the royal Corvinus family of Wallachia...who abandoned the throne of my own will, having obtained asylum from the House of Austria, [breathed my last] on July 1, 1594."
