= Sublime Porte =

Synecdoche for the central government of the Ottoman Empire

Coordinates: 41°0′40″N 28°58′41″E

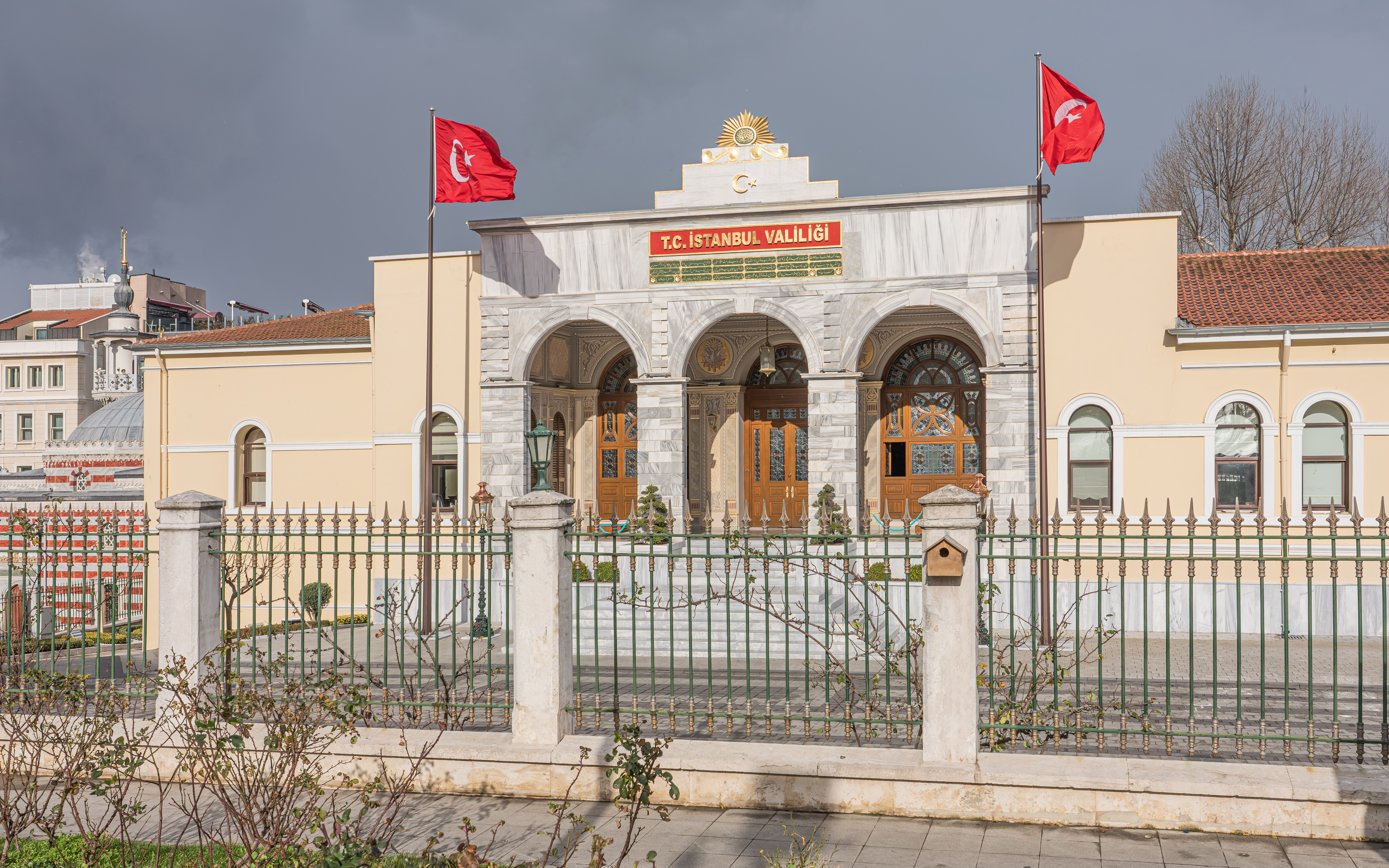
The Sublime Porte now houses the office of the Istanbul Governorate

The Sublime Porte, also known as the Ottoman Porte or High Porte (Ottoman Turkish: باب عالی, romanized: Bâb-ı Âlî or Babıali; Turkish pronunciation: [baːbɯˈaːliː]), was a metonymy used to refer collectively to the central government of the Ottoman Empire in Istanbul. It particularly referred to the building which housed the office of the Grand Vizier, Ministry of Foreign Affairs, Ministry of the Interior, and the Supreme Council of Judicial Ordinances. Today it houses the office of the Istanbul governorate.

== History ==
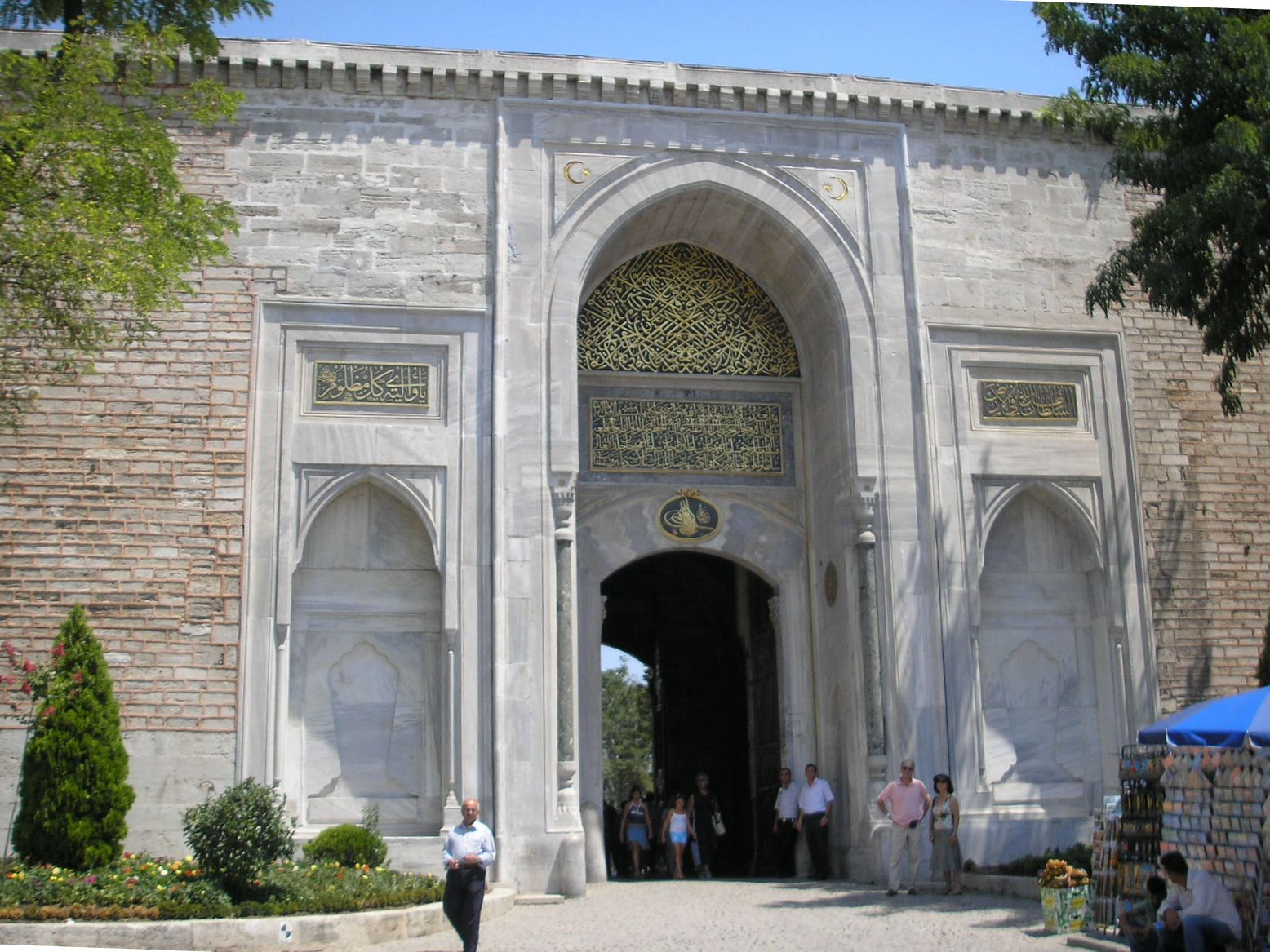
The Imperial Gate (Bâb-ı Hümâyûn), leading to the outermost courtyard of Topkapi Palace, was known as the Sublime Porte until the 18th century.

The name has its origins in the old practice in which the ruler announced his official decisions and judgements at the gate of his palace. This was the practice in the Byzantine Empire and it was also adopted by Ottoman Turk sultans since Orhan I. The palace of the sultan, or the gate leading to it, therefore became known as the "High Gate". This name referred first to a palace in Bursa, Turkey. After the Ottomans had conquered Constantinople, now Istanbul, the gate now known as the Imperial Gate (Turkish: Bâb-ı Hümâyûn), leading to the outermost courtyard of the Topkapı Palace, first became known as the "High Gate", or the "Sublime Porte".

When Sultan Suleiman the Magnificent sealed an alliance with King Francis I of France in 1536, the French diplomats walked through the monumental gate then known as Bâb-ı Âlî (now Bâb-ı Hümâyûn) in order to reach the Vizierate of Constantinople, seat of the Sultan's government. French being the language of diplomacy, the French translation Sublime Porte was soon adopted in most other European languages, including English, to refer not only to the actual gate but as a metonymy for the Ottoman Empire.

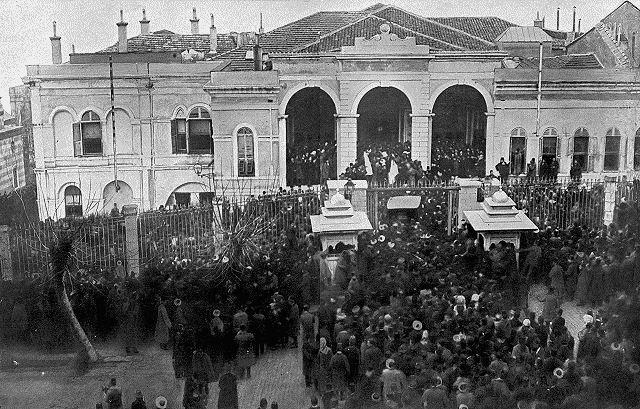
Crowd gathering in front of the Porte's buildings shortly after hearing about the 1913 Ottoman coup d'état (also known as the Raid on the Sublime Porte) inside.

In the 18th century, a new great Italian-styled office building was built just west of Topkapı Palace area, on the other side of Alemdar Caddesi (Alemdar Street). This became the location of the Grand Vizier and many ministries. Thereafter, this building, and the monumental gate leading to its courtyards, became known as the Sublime Porte (Bâb-ı Âlî); colloquially it was also known as the Gate of the Pasha (paşa kapusu). The building was rebuilt following a fire in 1839, and badly damaged by another fire in 1911. Today, the buildings house the Istanbul Governor's Office.

== Diplomacy ==
"Sublime Porte" was used in the context of diplomacy by Western states, as their diplomats were received at the porte (meaning "gate"). During the Second Constitutional Era of the Empire after 1908 (see Young Turk Revolution), the functions of the classical Divan-ı Hümayun were replaced by the reformed Imperial Government, and "porte" came to refer to the Foreign Ministry. During this period, the office of the Grand Vizier came to refer to the equivalent to that of a prime minister, and viziers became members of the Grand Vizier's cabinet as government ministers.

== See also ==
- Bab (disambiguation)
- Raid on the Sublime Porte
- Court of St James's, another synecdochic term, for the United Kingdom in diplomatic relations
- Kremlin, synecdochic term for the Russian government
