= Moldavian–Ottoman War (1475–1476) =

War between the Ottoman Empire and Moldavia in 1475–1476

- Part of the Moldavian–Ottoman Wars and Ottoman wars in Europe
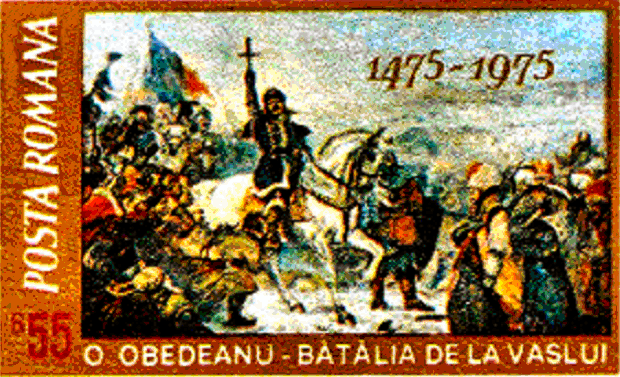
- 1975 commemoration of Battle of Vaslui
Date	6 January 1475 – 10 August 1476
Location	Moldavia
Result	Moldavian victory

Belligerents
Moldavia Limited support: Kingdom of Hungary Kingdom of Poland Grand Duchy of Lithuania	Ottoman Empire; Crimean Khanate; Nogai Tatars; Wallachia

Commanders and leaders
Stephen III; Alexandru	1475: (Note: Battle of Vaslui) (Ottoman Empire) Hadım Suleiman Pasha; Basarab III; 1476: (Note: Battle of Valea Albă) (Ottoman Empire) Mehmed II (Ottoman Empire) Gedik Ahmed Pasha

Strength
1475: (Note: Battle of Vaslui); 38,800–48,800 according to Maciej Stryjkowski; 1476: (Note: Battle of Valea Albă); 12,000 to 20,000	1475: (Note: Battle of Vaslui); 30,000 according to Kármán Gábor; 60,000–120,000 according to Maciej Stryjkowski; 1476: (Note: Battle of Valea Albă); 30,000

Casualties and losses
1475: (Note: Battle of Vaslui); Unknown; 1476: (Note: Battle of Valea Albă); Most of the army destroyed 7,000–8,000 prisoners executed	1475: (Note: Battle of Vaslui); 40,000–100,000 killed and 4,000 captured according to Venetian and Polish records. 1476: (Note: Battle of Valea Albă); 3,000

The Moldavian–Ottoman War (1475–1476) or Moldavian Campaign (1475–1476) was a conflict between the Ottoman Empire of Mehmed the Conqueror and the Principality of Moldavia of Stephen the Great, supported by their respective allies. It took place from 6 January 1475 to 10 August 1476 in the form of two campaigns, resulting in Moldavian victory.

== Prelude ==
In 1471, Moldavian voivode Stephen the Great refused to pay annual tribute to the Ottoman Empire. On 23 November 1473, Stephen invaded Wallachia and expelled Ottoman loyalist Radu III, replacing him with Basarab III (who later defected to the Ottomans). Stephen intended to undermine Ottoman influence over Wallachia in order to deprive them of resources and support they received in Wallachia. These provocations led to Mehmed the Conqueror ordering the Ottoman army of Hadım Suleiman Pasha to invade and conquer Moldavia.

== War ==
=== 1475 campaign ===
==== Battle of Vaslui ====
On 6 January 1475, the Republic of Venice was informed of the war that broke out between the Ottoman Empire and Moldavia. Moldavia had limited support from the Kingdom of Poland and Kingdom of Hungary, while the Ottomans were supported by the recently defected Wallachians of Basarab III. However, the Moldavians were able to count on a favourable environment when the Battle of Vaslui took place on 10 January 1475. The environment consisted of foggy marshes surrounded by mountains

As the battle took place, Moldavians repelled numerous Ottoman assaults on their positions. The turning point of the battle occurred when Stephen ordered his reserve force on the left flank to strike. The Ottoman army was subsequently routed, with their remnants fleeing in the direction of Siret and Danube. The Ottoman retreat lasted three days, during which they were harassed by Moldavian cavalry and suffered thousands of casualties.

Mehmed the Conqueror wanted to launch another campaign into Moldavia in 1475, but was unable to due to his illness, which forced him to limit his operations. Stephen attempted to organise a Christian anti-Ottoman crusade during this time, but diplomatically he achieved only a limited success and insufficient military support. Nonetheless, Stephen's increasing popularity in the rest of Christian Europe led to Pope Sixtus IV naming him the Athleta Christi ("Champion of Christ").

=== 1476 campaign ===
==== Battle of Ștefănești ====
On 29 May 1476, Stephen the Great was located at Iași. The Ottoman fleet with Tatar support assaulted Cetatea Albă and Chilia, but were unable to capture these fortresses. During this time, Wallachians assaulted the southern Moldavian borders, while the 30,000 Nogai and Crimean Tatars assaulted Ștefănești, Botoșani. This maneuver forced Stephen to leave some of his forces in the south, while his main army headed to north Moldavia to deal with the Tatar threat. However, some of his irregular troops wanted to return home, a request to which Stephen agreed and he subsequently only had 10,000 of his regular troops remaining in the army. Stephen was in unfavorable position, but despite this his army managed to defeat the Tatar forces in northern Moldavia.

==== Battle of Valea Albă ====
Stephen employed scorched earth and wore down the Ottoman forces in attempts to halt their advance from the south. Stephen's army was now in unfavorable condition and didn't have the advantageous environment on his side, as they established their defense at Valea Albă. In addition, the irregular troops of Stephen didn't unite with his regular army and the Ottomans made further advances into Moldavia as they crossed the river in July. On 25 July, the Moldavians defeated Ottoman vanguard heading towards Suceava. However, Mehmed the Conqueror's larger Ottoman army dispersed Moldavians and Stephen took shelter in the mountains.

==== Siege of Neamț Citadel ====
Despite Mehmed the Conqueror's victory at Valea Albă, the Ottomans were unable to capitalize on it and this Ottoman victory had proven to be only a temporary setback for Moldavians. The Ottoman forces unsuccessfully besieged Suceava, Neamț and Hotin. The Moldavian fortresses put up a fierce resistance to the Ottomans. The scorched earth strategy of Stephen, Moldavian units reorganising, failure to capture Neamț Citadel, diseases and hunger, in addition to the news of incoming Hungarian army forced Mehmed with his army to retreat on 10 August 1476. According to Hungarian King Matthias Corvinus, Mehmed II lost 50,000 troops in his unsuccessful campaign of 1476.

== Aftermath ==
Moldavia repelled the invasion. Stephen the Great's victory in a war against the Ottoman Empire during 1475–1476 secured Stephen's power and shaped the international perception of him. Pope Sixtus IV named Stephen the Athleta Christi ("Champion of Christ").

In 1477, Stephen made another attempt at organising an anti-Ottoman crusade together with other Christian states. However, on January 1479, the Republic of Venice signed a peace agreement with the Ottoman Empire. This led to Stephen also pursuing a less aggressive policy towards the Ottomans. However, this didn't prevent further conflicts from occurring with the Ottomans in the coming decade. Although the Ottomans abandoned their attempts to fully conquer or completely subjugate Moldavia.
