= Battle of Ștefănești =

1476 battle between Moldavia and Crimean Tatars

Battle of Ştefăneşti
- Part of the Moldavian–Ottoman War (1475–1476) and Crimean–Nogai slave raids in Eastern Europe
Date	July 1476
Location	Ștefănești, Moldavia
Result	Moldavian victory

Belligerents
Moldavia	Crimean Khanate; Nogai Tatars

Commanders and leaders
Stephen III	Eminek Mârza

Strength
10,000	10,000–30,000

Casualties and losses
Unknown	Very heavy

The Battle of Ştefăneşti took place in July 1476, during the Moldavian–Ottoman War, between the Moldavian army of Voivode Stephen the Great and Crimean–Nogai Tatar forces of Murza Eminek Mârza, resulting in Moldavian victory.

== Prelude ==
After the Ottoman defeat at Battle of Vaslui in 1475, Sultan Mehmed II decided to personally lead the campaign in 1476. On 29 May, the Ottoman and Tatar fleet launched failed assaults on Cetatea Albă and Chilia. However, Mehmed II would then intend to divert Stephen the Great's main army, sending out a force of Crimean and Nogai Tatars to raid northern Moldavia. This put Stephen into a difficult position, but nonetheless he decided to lead the Moldavian army to Ștefănești, in order to repel the Tatar invasion.

== Battle ==
When the battle took place at Ștefănești, Stephen's army wasn't at full strength, since his irregular forces requested to demobilize and head home. Stephen complied with the demands of his irregular army, leaving him with only 10,000 regular troops. On the opposing side, there was a raiding force consisting of 10,000–30,000 Tatars.

After the Tatars crossed the Dniester, they "caused great destruction and looting". Stephen left parts of his army at the Danube and headed towards Ștefănești. The Tatars began to retreat at the news of the Great Horde attack on the Crimean Khanate. However, they were pursued by the Moldavian cavalry. According to Jan Długosz, after the Moldavians caught up with the Tatars, Stephen "threw himself upon the army of the Tatars, whose powers he feared more than those of the Turks. And with God's help you crush them in a fierce slaughter. And he pursued the fugitives with such zeal that he killed more in flight than in battle".

== Aftermath ==
The battle resulted in Moldavian victory and enormous losses to the Tatars. Murza Eminek Mârza in his letter to Sultan Mehmed II stated: "the infidel, coming after us, made a fierce war with us; many of our men have perished; two of my brothers became martyrs; skilled fighters, horses and weapons perished".

Despite Stephen's victory against Tatars at Ștefănești, his focus on Tatar attacks in the north allowed the Ottoman army of Mehmed II to move deeper into Moldavia, with Stephen's next confrontation culminating in a less successful Battle of Valea Albă.
