= Războieni, Neamț =

Războieni
- Commune
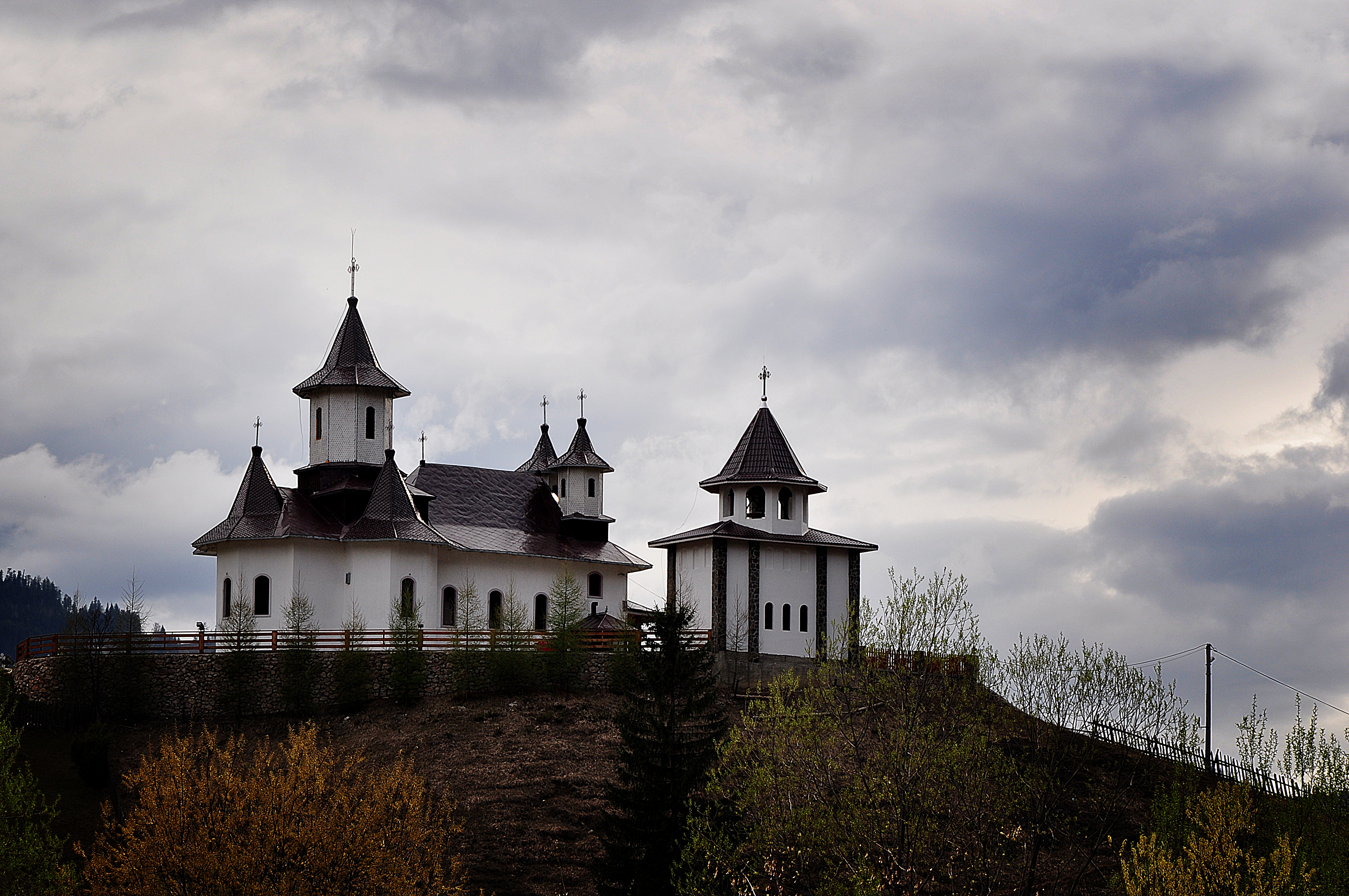
- Războieni Monastery

- Location in Neamț County

- Location in Romania
- Coordinates: 47.093°N 26.556°E
- Country: Romania
- County: Neamț

Government
  - Mayor (2024–2028): Sebastian-Bogdan Țarălungă (PSD)
- Area: 22.19 km^{2} (8.57 sq mi)
- Elevation: 351 m (1,152 ft)
- Population (2021-12-01): 1,879
  - Density: 84.68/km^{2} (219.3/sq mi)
- Time zone: UTC+02:00 (EET)
  - Summer (DST): UTC+03:00 (EEST)
- Postal code: 617375
- Area code: +(40) 233
- Vehicle reg.: NT
- Website: www.comunarazboieni.ro

Războieni is a commune in Neamț County, Western Moldavia, Romania. It is composed of five villages: Borșeni, Războieni, Războienii de Jos, Valea Albă, and Valea Mare.

The commune is located in the central-east part of the county, on the banks of the river Valea Albă. It is situated 29 km (18 mi) southeast of Târgu Neamț and 30 km (19 mi) northeast of the county seat, Piatra Neamț. Războieni is crossed by the county road DJ208G, which connects it to the south to Dragomirești, Ștefan cel Mare, and Girov (where it ends in DN15D) and to the east to Tupilați.

== 1476 Battle of Valea Albă ==
The Battle of Valea Albă, also known as the Battle of Războieni, took place at Războieni on July 26, 1476, between the Moldavian army of Stephen the Great and the invading Ottoman Turks under Sultan Mehmed the Conqueror, who won the day.

The Războieni Monastery is located in the village of Valea Albă. The monastery's Holy Archangel Michael Church was built by Stephen the Great to commemorate that battle, 20 years later. Dedicated on November 8, 1496, the church rests on a sanctuary holding the remains of the Moldavian soldiers fallen there.

Historical population
| Year | Pop. | ±% |
|---|---|---|
| 1992 | 2,421 | — |
| 2002 | 2,398 | −1.0% |
| 2011 | 2,272 | −5.3% |
| 2021 | 1,879 | −17.3% |
Source: Census data

== Natives ==
- Constantin Virgil Gheorghiu (1916–1992), writer
