= Hanu Ancuței =

Hanu Ancuţei may refer to:

- Hanu Ancuţei (novel) ("Ancuţa's Inn"), a 1928 novel by Romanian author Mihail Sadoveanu
- Hanul Ancuţei, a village in Tupilați Commune, Neamţ County, Romania, and site of the inn
