= Battle of Valea Albă =

Battle in present day Romania

Coordinates: 47.0783°N 26.5603°E

Battle of Valea Albă/Războieni/Akdere
- Part of the Moldavian–Ottoman War (1475–1476)
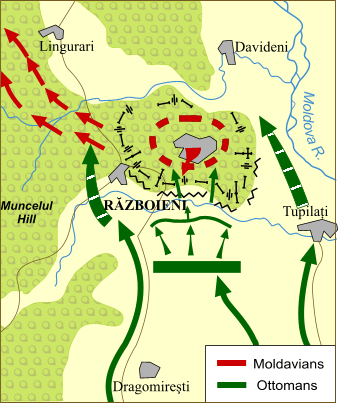
| Date | 26 July 1476 |
| Location | Războieni, present-day Romania |
| Result | Ottoman victory |

Belligerents
| Ottoman Empire | Moldavia; Kingdom of Hungary; Lithuania |

Commanders and leaders
| Mehmed II; Gedik Ahmed Pasha; Suleiman Pasha; Mehmed Agha; Zachia Di Longo † | Stephen the Great; Alexandru of Moldavia |

Strength
| Alternative estimates: 30,000 Over 100,000 (campaign strength; battle strength; considered "impossible" by Théophile Lavallée, as reported by Guboğlu) | 10,000–12,000 up to 20,000 |

Casualties and losses
| Not even 3,000 30,000 (exaggerated) | Stephen managed to escape with only a few soldiers, 7,000–8,000 prisoners executed (exaggerated claim by Kemal-Paşa-Zade, contradicts campaign outcome) 200–1,000 (dead and prisoners) Too many losses according to Stephen the Great |

The Battle of Valea Albă, also known as the Battle of Războieni or the Battle of Akdere, was an important event in the medieval history of Moldavia. It took place at Războieni, also known as Valea Albă, on 26 July 1476, between the Moldavian army of Stephen the Great and an invading Ottoman army which was commanded personally by Sultan Mehmed the Conqueror.

== Background ==
In 1475 the Ottoman's attempt to bring Moldavia under their control, at winter by using an army of Rumelian local levies, ended disastrously with a defeat in the Battle of Vaslui. During the proper military campaign season, the Ottomans assembled a large army, estimated by contemporary western sources at about 90,000–150,000 soldiers, under the command of Sultan Mehmed II and entered Moldavia in June 1476.

According to Papacostea and Teodor, Mehmed II entered Moldavia with an army of over 100,000 men, but according to Kármán Gábor, these sources are undoubtedly exaggerated, the fact that the first 100,000-strong army in Ottoman military history was formed during the reign of Selim II and that Ottoman military records kept at the time of the war recorded that the army was close to 30,000 shows that western sources give exaggerated numbers.

Meanwhile, groups of Tartars from the Crimean Khanate (the Ottomans' recent ally) were sent to attack Moldavia. According to Papacostea and Teodor, they were repelled. But according to Stanford Shaw, joint Ottoman and Crimean Tatar forces "occupied Bessarabia and took Akkerman, gaining control of the southern mouth of the Danube. Stephan tried to avoid open battle with the Ottomans by following a scorched-earth policy." However, later in the same work Shaw dates the Ottoman capture of Kilia to 14 July 1484 and the Crimean Tatar capture of Akkerman to 3 August 1484, placing Akkerman on the Dniester rather than the Danube. In the process the Moldavians forces ended up being dispersed throughout the country, leaving only a small force of about 10,000–12,000 men, led by Stephen himself, to face the main Ottoman attack.

== Battle ==
First of all, Moldavia possessed a geography that was unsuitable for classical forms of warfare. Covered with forests and swamps, it did not allow the application of conventional infantry and cavalry formations, tactics, and techniques. Moreover, the transport and effective use of heavy weapons and equipment—artillery in particular—was extremely difficult. The enemy avoided conventional battles and instead made use of the terrain and popular support, employing unconventional warfare tactics and techniques. The Ottoman army was unable to force the enemy into a decisive pitched battle, nor was there any major city or fortress whose capture could compel the enemy to surrender or seek peace. Moldavia also lacked the resources necessary to sustain a large army. Even worse, the empire’s famed logistical system could provide only limited support in this land, which lacked proper roads and clear routes.

After advancing across Moldavian territory for about forty days, Mehmed II was unable to locate Stephen. Had it not been for the supplies provided by the Ottoman fleet on the Danube, the Turkish army would have found itself in a very difficult situation. Stephen, deeming it unwise to confront the Ottoman army directly, instead seized opportunities to ambush and destroy small Ottoman detachments whenever possible.

Finally, on 26 July 1476, Stephen was forced to fight when he found himself surrounded on all sides in the White Valley (Akdere; Pârâul Alb; Războieni; Valea Albă), near Cetatea Neamțului. Stephen attacked the forces of Hadım Süleyman Pasha, who were advancing as the vanguard. Süleyman Pasha mounted his horse and countered the attack. In this way, Mehmed was able to force his opponent into battle through the deployment of his corps formation. Stephen sought to defeat Süleyman Pasha and compel him to withdraw; however, Mehmed II continuously fed small units into the battlefield. When Mehmed II finally arrived on the field with his main army, Stephen was forced to withdraw to a fortified position.

With the 20,000 men under his command, Stephen anchored his rear against a forested hill at this position. He fortified his front and flanks by digging trenches or entrenchments known as peçine, constructed defensive works from trees and wagons, placed horses in front of these defenses, and positioned his artillery at the very front. The Moldavian army also included auxiliary contingents of selected Polish and Hungarian soldiers.

The Moldavians poured cannon fire, gunfire, arrows, and crossbow bolts onto the Turkish army and defended their position fiercely. Since the ground on which the Turkish troops stood was somewhat lower, many of the cannonballs passed over the soldiers’ heads. Nevertheless, as the area was heavily forested and enclosed on all sides, it was not easy to advance. Under the enemy’s artillery fire, the Janissaries took cover and began lying face down on the ground. Thereupon, Mehmed II reprimanded the Janissary Agha, Mehmed Agha, and then personally charged forward with his shield. Seeing their sultan advance, the Janissaries took heart and rose from where they had taken cover to launch an attack. Mehmed Agha, however, had been unable to achieve this.

When the Janissaries reached a very wide but shallow watercourse, they encountered Moldavian troops positioned on the opposite bank. Mehmed II engaged these forces in combat. He then left the Janissaries, brought up the cavalry units positioned to the rear, and launched another attack against the Moldavian forces holding the river line, driving them back. However, the Ottomans suffered some losses, including Zachia di Longo. Mehmed II then turned toward the hill held personally by Stephen, where Süleyman Pasha was already engaged in combat.

According to the Turkish military history and Selahattin Tansel, the Ottoman troops were initially unable to break through Stephen’s defensive fortifications. They state that forces under the command of Gedik Ahmed Pasha eventually opened a breach in the Moldavian front and charged through it, after which the Janissaries under the command of Mehmed Agha overcame the obstacles before them and attacked the Moldavian forces. According to these accounts, the sultan moved constantly within the army, running from one side to the other, and as darkness fell the exhausted Moldavian forces began to retreat. The same sources state that the battle then became one-sided, that Stephen escaped with only a few men, that several of his commanders were captured and his camp was plundered, and that Mehmed II ordered the execution of 7,000–8,000 captured prisoners.

Stephen narrowly escaped the fate that had befallen the Bosnian king of the same name.

Mihail Guboğlu reports that Théophile Lavallée regarded the claim that Mehmed II lost 30,000 soldiers in this battle as certainly exaggerated, considered even a figure of 3,000 doubtful, and regarded it as impossible for either Süleyman Pasha or Mehmed II to have dispatched armies numbering 100,000 men to Moldavia.

== Aftermath ==
Stephen retreated into the north-western part of Moldavia or even into the Polish Kingdom and began forming another army. The Ottomans captured considerable parts of Moldavian territory but were unable to conquer some of the major Moldavian strongholds such as Suceava, Neamț, and Hotin and were constantly harassed by small-scale Moldavians attacks. Soon they were also confronted with starvation, a situation made worse by an outbreak of the plague.

Meanwhile, anti-Ottoman forces were being assembled in Transylvania under Stephen V Báthory's command. Confronted with this army and with Stephen's counterattack, after failing to conquer Neamț Citadel the Ottomans retreated from major parts of Moldavia in August 1476 to come back again in 1480.

== In fiction ==
In the Romanian theatrical play Apus de Soare by Barbu Ștefănescu Delavrancea (set in the final year of Stephen's reign), one can find a description of the battle in the form of a dialog between the daughters and widows of the boyars who had fallen in the battle, in which they describe how their respective fathers and husbands had to drag Stephen out of the battle, as he desperately tried to keep fighting.

== Bibliography ==
- Kármán, Gábor; Kunčevic, Lovro, eds. (2013). The European Tributary States of the Ottoman Empire in the Sixteenth and Seventeenth Centuries. Leiden: Brill. ISBN 9789004246065.
