= Siege of Neamț Citadel =

1476 siege of the Moldavian-Ottoman War

- Part of the Moldavian–Ottoman War (1475–1476)
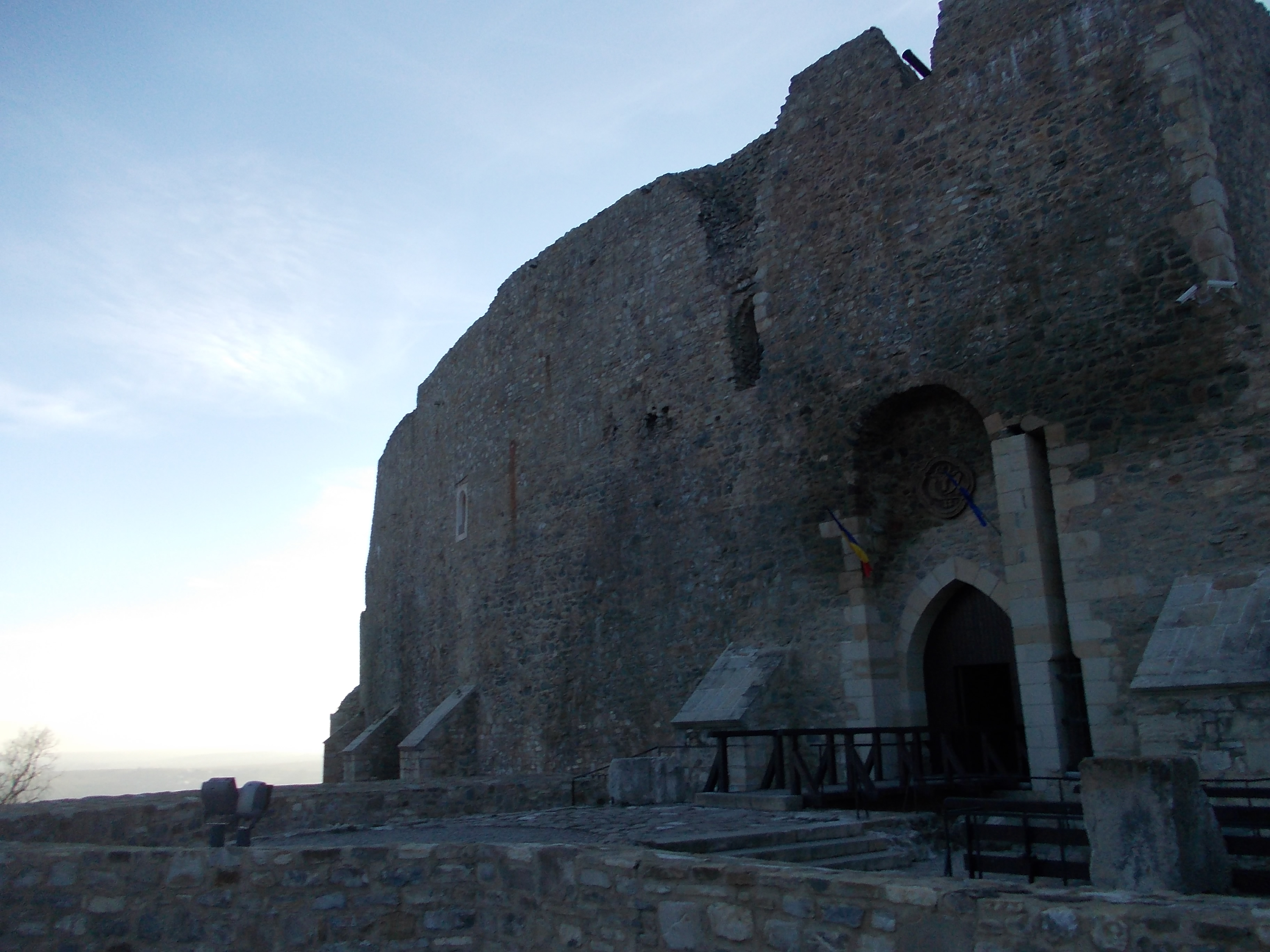
- Preserved remains of the Neamț Citadel
Date	c. August 1476
Location	Neamț Citadel, Moldavia (present-day Neamț County, near Târgu Neamț, Romania)
Result	Moldavian victory
Territorial changes	Mehmed II retreats from Moldavia

Belligerents
Moldavia	Ottoman Empire

Commanders and leaders
Stephen III	(Ottoman Empire) Mehmed II

The Siege of Neamț Citadel took place during the Moldavian–Ottoman War. It was conducted by the Ottoman army of Mehmed the Conqueror against the Moldavian garrison of Stephan the Great. It took place on c. August 1476.

== Prelude ==
Stephen the Great predicted that Mehmed II's Ottoman army will reach Suceava, Neamț and Hotin. For this reason, Stephen ensured that these cities were fortified and well-supplied in the case of prolonged siege. Stephen also employed scorched earth in the south of Moldavia in order to slow and wear down the advancing Ottoman army. However, these measures didn't not stop the Ottoman army and Stephen would now have to rely on these fortresses to stop the Ottomans after the Moldavian defeat at Valea Albă. Although this battle wasn't a decisive defeat for Stephen.

== Siege ==
The Ottoman army headed towards the Moldavian capital of Suceava. However, Mehmed II put high emphasis on capturing the Neamț Citadel, as he was informed about the Ottoman captives held there, which were held there after the Ottoman defeat at Vaslui in 1475. Stephen didn't head to Neamț straight away and instead tried to reorganise his army. He intended to defeat the Ottomans through guerilla warfare methods rather than in a single decisive battle.

The Ottoman army ravaged the countryside and several villages in Podolia, but were unable to capture the fortresses. According to Ion Neculce, "the Turkish emperor came with all his strength to the Neamț Fortress and climbed the rifles over a mountain towards Moldavia and began to beat the Neamț Fortress very hard". The Moldavians responded with fire towards the Ottoman positions and carried out sorties on the Ottoman camp, forcing the Ottoman troops to retreat from their position on the mountain. Neculce also states that the fortress held a German captive, who was freed in exchange for assistance.

== Aftermath ==
The Ottoman army failed to capture Neamț Citadel and was forced to withdraw. Ottoman sieges of Suceava and Hotin also ended in failure. The overall attrition inflicted on the Ottoman army through Stephen III's scorched earth, incoming Hungarian assistance, reorganised Moldavian army, combined with diseases and hunger forced Mehmed II to retreat from Moldavia on 10 August 1475. 17th–18th century Moldavian Prince Dimitrie Cantemir stated about these events:

In the rush of the Turks, Stephen won the sultan's own royal tent and had the glory of conquering that emperor who was once the terror of the world, and now he was only too happy to be able to escape safely to Adrianople, accompanied by only a small retinue.
