= Constantin Virgil Gheorghiu =

Romanian writer

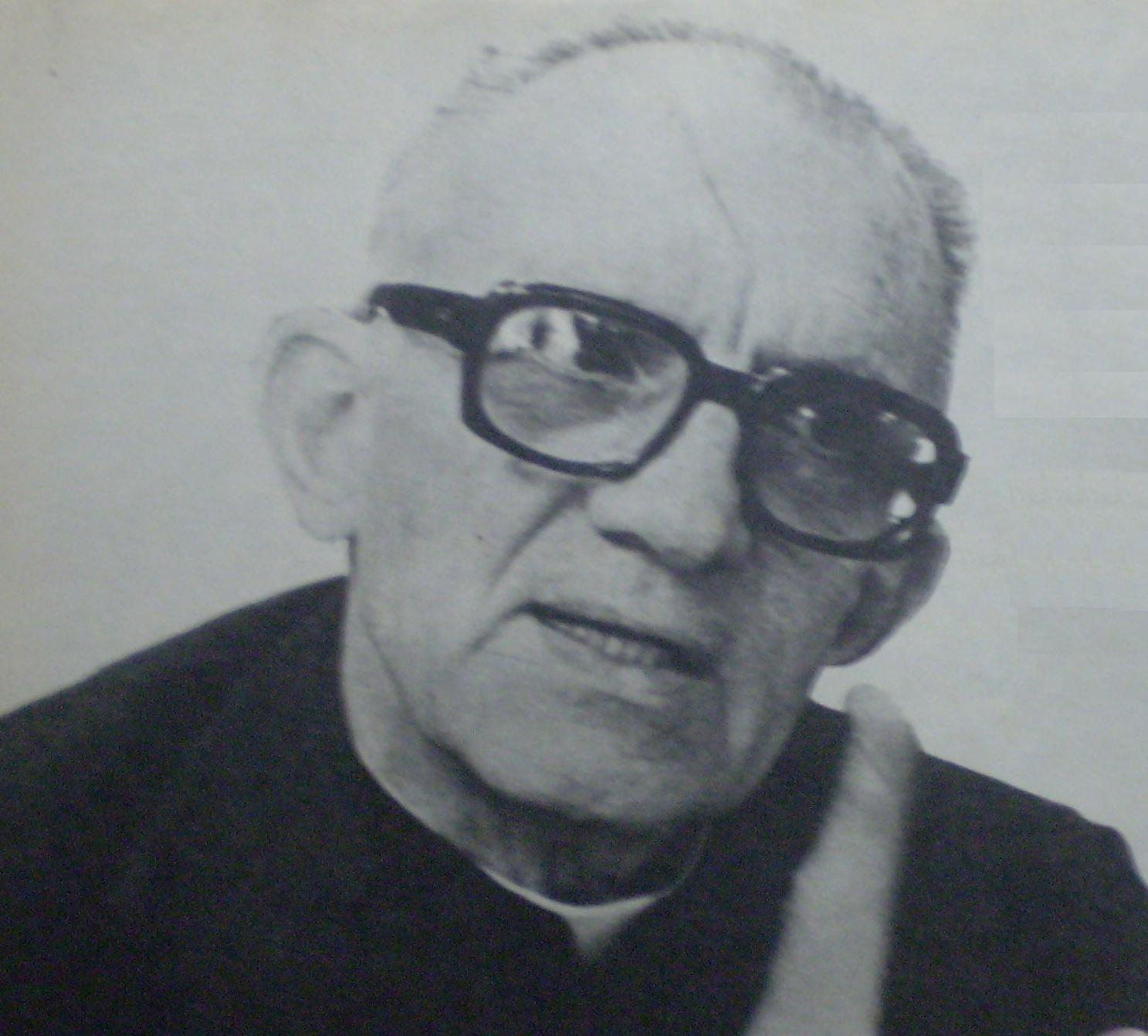
- Born: September 15, 1916; Războieni, Kingdom of Romania
- Died: June 22, 1992 (aged 75); Paris, France
- Resting place: Passy Cemetery, Paris
- Education: University of Bucharest; Heidelberg University
- Occupations: Writer, diplomat, priest
- Writing career
- Notable work: The 25th Hour

Constantin Virgil Gheorghiu (Romanian pronunciation: [konstanˈtin virˈdʒil ɡe̯orˈɡi.u]; September 15, 1916 in Războieni, Romania – June 22, 1992 in Paris, France) was a Romanian writer, best known for his 1949 novel, The 25th Hour, first published by Plon in France.

== Life ==
Virgil Gheorghiu was born in Valea Albă, a village in Războieni Commune, Neamț County, in Romania. His father was an Orthodox priest in Petricani. A top student, he attended high school in Chișinău from 1928 to June 1936, after which he studied philosophy and theology at the University of Bucharest and at Heidelberg University.

He traveled and stayed in Saudi Arabia to learn the Arabic language and the Arab culture, before writing the biography of Muhammad. The book was translated from Romanian to French and to Persian in Iran and in Urdu in Pakistan; unfortunately, this book was never translated into English. Its Hindi translation was being printed in India and was expected to be available by January 2020, with the Hindi title saying "A prophet you do not know".

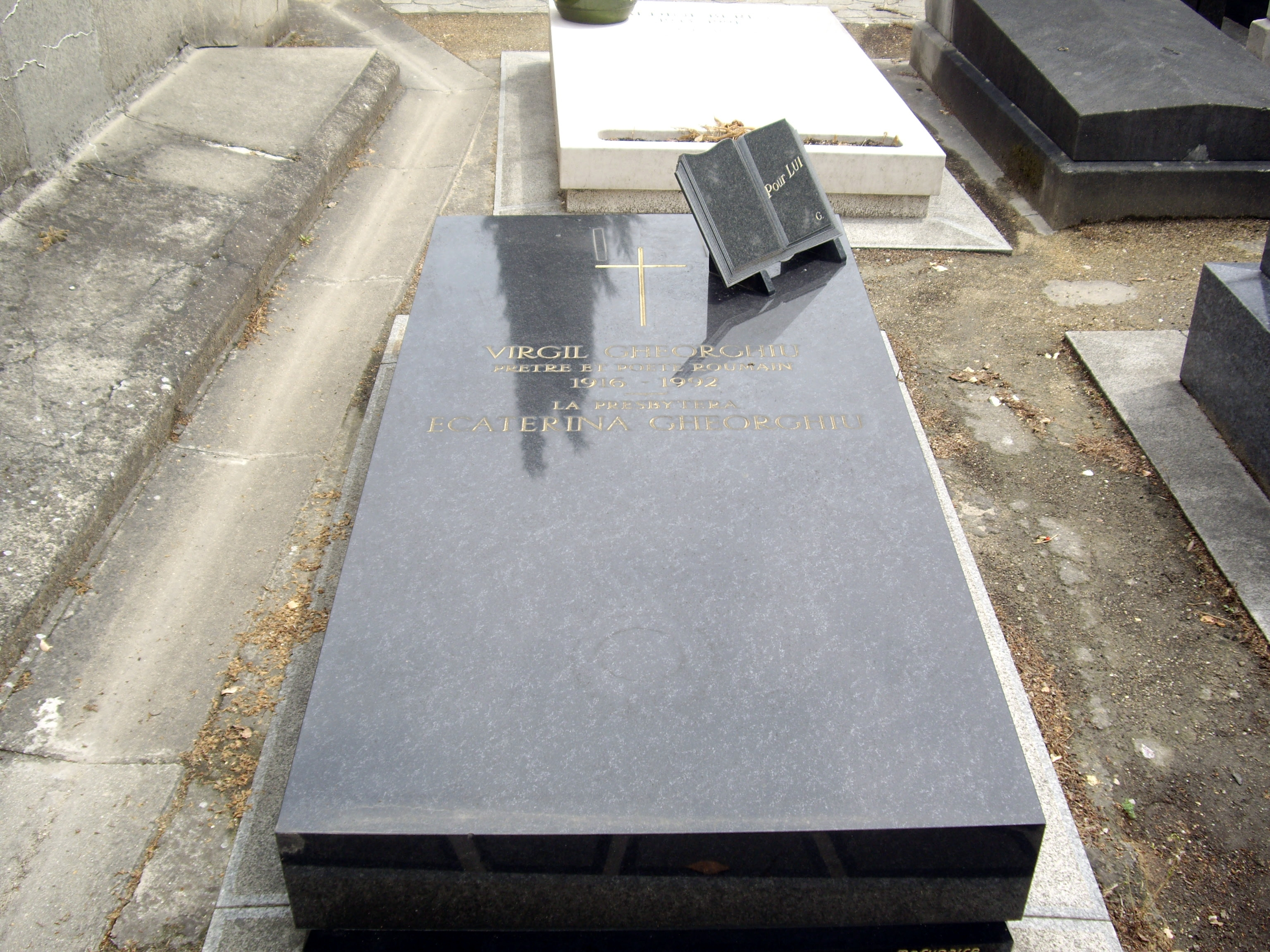
Grave of Gheorghiu at Passy Cemetery

Between 1942 and 1943, during the regime of General Ion Antonescu, Gheorghiu served in the Ministry of Foreign Affairs of Romania as an embassy secretary. He went into exile when Soviet troops entered Romania in August 1944. Arrested at the end of World War II by American troops, he eventually settled in France in 1948. A year later, he published the novel Ora 25 (in French: La vingt-cinquième heure; in English: The Twenty-Fifth Hour), written during his captivity.

Gheorghiu was ordained a priest of the Romanian Orthodox Church at the Saint Archangels Church in Paris on May 23, 1963. In 1966, Patriarch Justinian elevated him to the rank of iconom stavrofor and in 1970 he was named archpresbyter of the Patriarchate of Constantinople at the Orthodox Center of the Ecumenical Patriarch in Chambésy, Switzerland. In 1971 Gheorghiu became Patriarch of the Romanian Orthodox Church in France.

He is buried in the Passy Cemetery, in Paris.

== The Twenty-Fifth Hour ==
Gheorghiu's best-known book depicts the plight of a naive Romanian young farmhand, Johann Moritz, under German, Soviet and American occupation of Central Europe. Johann is sent to a labor camp by a police captain who covets his wife, Suzanna. At first, he is tagged as "Jacob Moritz", a Jew. Then, he and fellow Jewish prisoners escape to Hungary, where he is interned as a citizen of an enemy country. The Hungarian government sends its foreign residents as Hungarian "voluntary workers to Nazi Germany". Later, "Moritz János" is "rescued" by a Nazi officer who determines he is a perfect Aryan specimen, and forces him into service in the Waffen SS as a model for German propaganda. Imprisoned after the war, he is beaten severely by his Russian captors, then tried by Allied forces because of his work for the Nazis. Meanwhile, Traian, son of the priest Koruga who employed Moritz in their Romanian village, is a famous novelist and minor diplomat whose first internment comes when he is arrested as an enemy alien by the Yugoslavs. Once imprisoned, the two heroes begin an odyssey of torture and despair. Traian Koruga is deeply unsettled because what he sees as the machinism and inhumanity of the "Western technical society", where individuals are treated as members of a category. Meanwhile, Koruga is writing a book, "The 25th Hour", about Johann Moritz and the ordeal awaiting mankind. In the end, Traian takes his own life in an American-Polish concentration camp, while Johann is forced by the Americans to choose between either enlisting in the army, just as World War III is about to start, or to be interned in a camp (as well as his family) as a citizen from an enemy country.

The book was published in French translation in 1949 and was not published in Romania until 1991 (first time published in Romania by Editura Omegapres, Bucharest, 1991).

In 1967, Carlo Ponti produced a movie based on Gheorghiu's book. The movie was directed by Henri Verneuil, with Anthony Quinn as Johann, Virna Lisi as Suzanna, and Serge Reggiani as Traian.

== Works ==
- Tărâmul celalalt: versuri, Fundația pentru literatură și artă Regele Carol 2, Bucharest, 1938 OCLC 876297515
- Cântece de faun, Fundația regală pentru literatură și artă, Bucharest, 1940 OCLC 876297367
- Caligrafie pe zăpadă, Fundația pentru literatură și artă Regele Carol II, Bucharest, 1940 OCLC 895457097
- Ceasul de rugăciune: poeme, Editura Națională Gh. Mecu, Bucharest, 1942 OCLC 895126650
- Am luptat în Crimeea, Editura Națională Mecu, Bucharest, 1942 OCLC 935326273
- Rumänische Märchen, Ähren-Verl, Heidelberg, 1948 OCLC 720189167
- Ora 25, 1949. La vingt-cinquième heure, Éditions Plon, Paris, 1949 OCLC 1244129. The twenty-fifth hour (translated from the Romanian by Rita Eldon), Alfred A. Knopf, New York, 1950 OCLC 1004789299
- La seconde chance (translated from the Romanian by Livia Lamoure), Éditions Plon, Paris, 1952 OCLC 1009460979
- L'homme qui voyagea seul (translated from the Romanian by Livia Lamoure), Éditions Plon, Paris, 1954 OCLC 906324969
- Le peuple des immortels (translated from the Romanian by Livia Lamoure), Éditions Plon, Paris, 1955 OCLC 12617111
- Les sacrifiés du Danube, Éditions Plon, Paris, 1957 OCLC 5417727
- Saint Jean bouche d'or (translated from the Romanian by Livia Lamoure), Éditions Plon, Paris, 1957 OCLC 34416278
- Les mendiants de miracles, Le Livre de Poche, Paris, 1958 OCLC 741433563
- La cravache, Éditions Plon, Paris, 1960 OCLC 5417872
- Perahim (translated from the Romanian by Livia Lamoure), Éditions Plon, Paris, 1961 OCLC 460484745
- La maison de Petrodava (translated from the Romanian by Livia Lamoure), Éditions Plon, 1961 OCLC 299904197
- La vie de Mahomet (translated from the Romanian by Livia Lamoure), Éditions Plon, 1963. Éditions du Rocher, 1999. ISBN 2-268-03275-2
- Les immortels d'Agapia, 1964. Éditions Gallimard, 1998 ISBN 2-07-040287-8. The immortals of the mountain (translated from the French by Milton Stansbury), Regnery Publishing, Chicago, 1969
- La jeunesse du docteur Luther (translated from the Romanian by Livia Lamoure), Éditions Plon, 1965
- De la vingt-cinquième heure à l'heure éternelle, Éditions Plon, 1965. Éditions du Rocher, 1990 ISBN 2-268-01038-4
- Le meurtre de Kyralessa, 1966. The Death of Kyralessa (translated from the French by Marika Mihalyi), Regnery Publishing, Chicago, 1968 ISBN 0-8371-7991-2
- La tunique de peau, Éditions Plon, 1967 OCLC 299584844
- La condottiera, Rombaldi, Collection Le Club de la Femme, 1969
- Pourquoi m'a-t-on appelé Virgil?, Éditions Plon, 1968
- La vie du patriarche Athénagoras, Éditions Plon, 1969
- L'espionne, Éditions Plon, 1973. Éditions du Rocher, 1990 ISBN 2-268-00985-8
- Dieu ne reçoit que le dimanche, Éditions Plon, 1975
- Les inconnus de Heidelberg, Éditions Plon, 1977 ISBN 2-259-00195-5
- Le grand exterminateur, Éditions Plon, 1978 ISBN 2-259-00323-0
- Les amazones du Danube, Éditions Plon, 1978 ISBN 2-259-00402-4
- Dieu à Paris, Éditions Plon, 1980, ISBN 2-259-00613-2
- Mémoires: Le témoin de la vingt-cinquième heure, Éditions Plon, 1986 ISBN 2-259-01435-6
- La Corée, la belle inconnue de l'Extrême-Orient - A l'heure des Jeux Olympiques, 1987
- La Condottiera (translated from the original French into English by Inez Fitzgerald Storck), Arouca Press, Waterloo, ON, 2022 ISBN 978-1-990685-21-7
