= The 25th Hour (film) =

The 25th Hour (La Vingt-cinquième Heure)
- Film poster by Howard Terpning
- Directed by: Henri Verneuil
- Written by: François Boyeur; Wolf Mankowitz; Henri Verneuil
- Produced by: Carlo Ponti
- Starring: Anthony Quinn; Virna Lisi
- Cinematography: Andreas Winding
- Music by: Georges Delerue; Maurice Jarre
- Distributed by: Metro-Goldwyn-Mayer
- Release dates: 16 February 1967 (US); 26 April 1967 (France)
- Running time: 196 minutes (Europe)
- Countries: France; Italy; Yugoslavia
- Languages: French; English; Romanian

The 25th Hour (French: La Vingt-cinquième Heure) is a 1967 anti-war drama film directed by Henri Verneuil, produced by Carlo Ponti and starring Anthony Quinn and Virna Lisi. The film is based on the bestselling novel by C. Virgil Gheorghiu and follows the troubles experienced by a Romanian peasant couple caught up in World War II.

== Plot ==
In a small Transylvanian village, a local police constable frames Johann Moritz on charges of being Jewish because Moritz's wife Suzanna has refused the constable's advances. Moritz is sent to a Romanian concentration camp as a Jew, where he is known as Jacob Moritz. He escapes to Hungary with some Jewish prisoners, but the Hungarians imprison them for being citizens of Romania, an enemy country. The Hungarian authorities eventually send them to Germany to fill German requests for foreign laborers. Moritz is spotted by an SS officer who designates him as an Aryan German Romanian, freeing him from the labor camp and forcing him to join the Waffen-SS. After the war, Moritz is brutally beaten by the Soviets for having been a member of the Waffen-SS. He is then arrested and prosecuted as a war criminal by the Americans. Eventually he is released and reunited with his wife and sons in occupied Germany.

The film is based on the novel of the same name by Constantin Virgil Gheorghiu. The storyline includes Hungary's alliance with Nazi Germany, the forced cession of Bessarabia and Northern Bukovina to the Soviet Union in 1940 and subsequent events in Central Europe during and after World War II.

== Cast ==
- Anthony Quinn as Johann Moritz
- Virna Lisi as Suzanna Moritz
- Serge Reggiani as Traian Koruga
- Grégoire Aslan as Nicolae Dobresco
- Michael Redgrave as defence lawyer
- Marcel Dalio as Strul (as Dalio)
- Jan Werich as Sgt. Constantin
- Marius Goring as Oberst Müller
- Alexander Knox as Prosecutor
- Liam Redmond as Father Koruga
- Meier Tzelniker as Abramovici
- Kenneth J. Warren as Inspector Varga
- John Le Mesurier as Tribunal president
- Jacques Marin as the soldier at Debresco
- Françoise Rosay as Mrs. Nagy
- Paul Pavel as a prisoner in the truck
- Jacques Préboist as a prisoner in the truck
- Jean Desailly as the minister's chief of staff
- Albert Rémy as Joseph Grenier
- Jacques Marbeuf as the German officer
- Robert Beatty as Colonel Greenfield
- Harold Goldblatt as Isaac Nagy

== Reception ==
In a contemporary review for The New York Times, critic Bosley Crowther panned The 25th Hour as "... such a tasteless and pointless hodgepodge of deadly serious and crudely comic elements, of tragic historical allusions grossly garbled in specious movie terms, that it looms large as one of the most disreputable and embarrassing films in recent years ..." Crowther was especially critical of Anthony Quinn's character and performance: "... [T]here is no real continuity or real sincerity in the nature of the man. He ranges from an image of the poignant victim to one of a genial simpleton. And in all his shuddering misadventures, so darkly shadowed by the facts of history, he manifests no awareness of relation to the suffering of others or even a point of view. The only philosophical reaction registered by Mr. Quinn—or provided by his script writers—is one of confusion that this is happening to him. The impression transmitted by all this is one of utter insensitivity."

Los Angeles Times film critic Philip K. Scheuer wrote: "One has to keep telling oneself what a good actor Anthony Quinn is in order to sustain interest ... For this odyssey of a wandering non-Jew takes up to 2 1/4 hours to say what it has to say, and even this doesn't add up to much which is new ..."
