= Battle of Ghindăoani =

1395 battle between Moldavian and Hungarian armies

Battle of Ghindăoani (1395)
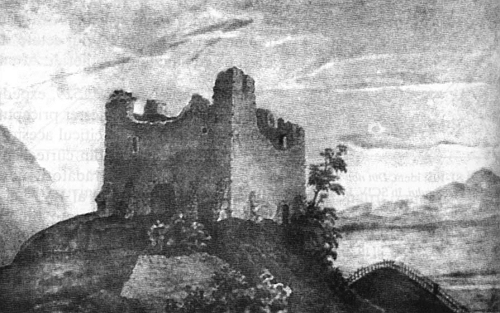
- Neamț Citadel, which was sieged by Hungarian forces, illustrated in 1845
Date	12 February 1395
Location	Neamț Citadel and north-eastern Moldavia 47°07′00″N 26°25′00″E
Result	Disputed

Belligerents
Voivodeship of Moldavia	Kingdom of Hungary

Commanders and leaders
Stephen I of Moldavia	King Sigismund of Hungary
- Location within modern Romania

The Battle of Ghindăoani (12 February 1395) was fought between Stephen I of Moldavia and Sigismund of Luxembourg, who was at that time the King of Hungary. The battle took place near the village of Ghindăoani, corresponding to the medieval site of Hindău. It is one of the earliest documented battles fought in the Moldavian Principality and was motivated by Stephen's refusal to acknowledge Hungarian suzerainty.

== Background ==
The first historical records of Moldavia emerge in the early 14th century, with the region being described as an abandoned borderland of the Kingdom of Hungary, due to the vicinity of various nomadic peoples such as the Mongols and Tatars. Throughout the 1340s, several combined military initiatives aimed at driving out these peoples, involving the Hungarians and the Vlachs from the Voivodeship of Maramures, led to the Moldavian principality being established around 1346 by Dragoș the Founder.

Throughout the rest of the century, increasingly complex and often strained relations between Moldavia and Hungary developed. Moldavia would enjoy brief periods of independence from Hungary during the 1350s and 1360s, however the Polish-Hungarian Union of 1370 forced Moldavia to take into account Polish interests in the region, which ultimately culminated with the Polish vassalisation of Moldavia in 1387. This created a degree of friction between Poland and Hungary, and is one of the earliest examples of Moldavia playing its neighbouring great powers against each other, a strategy that would later be adopted to great effect by Stephen the Great in the 15th century.

Stephen I, who became voivode of Moldavia in 1394 with the support of the Jagiellonian dynasty, continued to bolster Moldavian-Polish relations, so much so that he agreed to bear arms against any enemy of Poland, including the King of Hungary. This stipulation caused much discontent in the Hungarian royal court, which was weary of the territorial ambitions of their Polish rivals whilst they were engaged with the Ottomans. In order to remove Moldavia from Polish suzerainty and replace it with Hungarian vassalage, Sigismund of Luxembourg decided to organise a military expedition to subdue the Moldavians.

== Battle ==
Sigismund launched his incursion into Moldavia by utilising the Oituz Pass in late January 1395.The vanguard of the Hungarian army, commanded by the Count of the Székelys, Stephen Kanizsai, managed to break through the Moldavian defensive lines, which were primarily composed of archers, fortified behind wooden palisades known as prisăci.

The main body of the Hungarian army, personally led by King Sigismund, is believed to have entered Moldavia through another mountain pass, most likely the one at Bicaz, with the intention of reaching Hârlău, where Stephen's seat was located. Harassed continuously by Moldavian cavalry detachments, the Hungarian army eventually reached the Neamț Citadel, which they besieged for several days before Stephen agreed to a formal peace on 3 February 1395.

Soon after, Stephen I broke the peace and regrouped his forces, launching a surprise counterattack against the retreating Hungarian army on its way back toward the Bicaz Pass. The ambush took place near Târgu Neamț, at Hindău on 12 February 1395. The narrow terrain favoured the Moldavian troops, who fired volleys of arrows to disrupt and fragment the Hungarian formations. Sigismund’s army, unable to properly deploy its full strength suffered losses and was forced into a disorganised retreat. Sigismund and his army withdrew across the Carpathians shortly thereafter, as inferred from a royal document issued only two days later in Brașov on 14 February 1395.

== Result ==
Romanian historiography traditionally regards the battle as a Moldavian victory, emphasising the successful ambush of Sigismund’s forces in the Carpathians and the temporary curtailment of Hungarian influence east of the mountains. It was an important step to consolidating Moldavia's early foreign policy.

The outcome of the engagement is disputed. Romanian historians emphasize that Moldavian troops inflicted losses and disrupted the Hungarian retreat, interpreting the battle as a tactical success for Stephen I. By contrast, contemporary Hungarian chronicles and Sigismund’s own correspondence report that the campaign achieved Hungarian objectives, noting that Sigismund’s forces advanced into Moldavia and returned to Transylvania in good order.

According to Hungarian historiography, the Moldavian campaign of Sigismund was a swift success, the operation laid the groundwork for his future plans, he could turn his attention to the Wallachian issue.

== Aftermath ==
The Battle of Ghindăoani marked a significant, if brief, assertion of Moldavian independence from Hungarian influence. Although the confrontation did not result in a decisive long-term shift in the balance of power, it demonstrated Moldavia’s growing military capability and diplomatic agility under Stephen I.

Following the battle, Sigismund of Luxembourg consolidated his focus on defending Hungary’s southern borders against the Ottoman Empire, temporarily abandoning attempts to directly impose suzerainty over Moldavia. Stephen I, in turn, reaffirmed his allegiance to the Polish Crown, strengthening Moldavia’s position within the Polish sphere of influence. In the years that followed, Moldavia continued to navigate between the competing interests of Hungary and Poland, using alliances and calculated neutrality to preserve its autonomy.

Despite the disagreement, the episode demonstrates Moldavia’s growing military capability and strategic positioning between Hungary and Poland, which would influence later campaigns in the region.
