= Hadım Suleiman Pasha (governor of Rumelia) =

Ottoman statesman (fl. 1474–1490)

Hadım Suleiman Pasha (Turkish: Hadım Süleyman Paşa; fl. 1474–1490), also known as Suleiman Pasha al-Khadim, was an Ottoman statesman and general, who served as the governor (beylerbey) of the Rumelia Eyalet (1474) and the Anatolia Eyalet. He was later a governor of the Sanjak of Amasya (1482–90) and the Sanjak of Smederevo (1490–?). He served during the reign of Mehmed II. His epithet hadım means "eunuch" in Arabic and Turkish.

== Life ==
Hadım Suleiman Pasha was born in Bosnia Eyalet. He was appointed the sanjak-bey of Albania during the reign of Mehmed the Conqueror (r. 1444–46, 1451–81). His office was brief, as contemporary sources attest that he was attacked and captured along with his retainers and servants and afterwards sold to a Catholic state (possibly Venice).

In 1474, he besieged the Venetian-held Shkodër (see Siege of Shkodër). The fortress was defended by Albanians and one Venetian called Antonio Loredano The Ottoman troops managed to damage parts of the fortress, but ultimately failed and Suleyman had to satisfy himself with his pillage he got during the siege. In December he began a march against Stephen the Great of Moldavia, who refused to pay homage to the Sultan. Suleyman was reluctant in marching against Moldavia, as his troops were exhausted from the failed siege and as winter was approaching, but he couldn't dare to question the Sultan's decision. The two met on 10 January 1475, at the Battle of Vaslui. The Ottoman forces suffered a major defeat with high casualties. However, this defeat was re-compensated during next summer when the Ottomans led by Mehmet II defeated Stephen on 17 July 1476 at Valea Albă. Occupation of Bessarabia & vital port-fortresses of Chilia/Kilija & Akkerman (Asprokastron/Cetatea Alba) took place in August 1484. [1]

In 1482, he was the governor of the Sanjak of Amasya, and then in the Sanjak of Smederevo in 1490, where he died.
