= Neamț Citadel =

Medieval fortress in Neamț County, Romania

Coordinates: 47.21429°N 26.3433°E

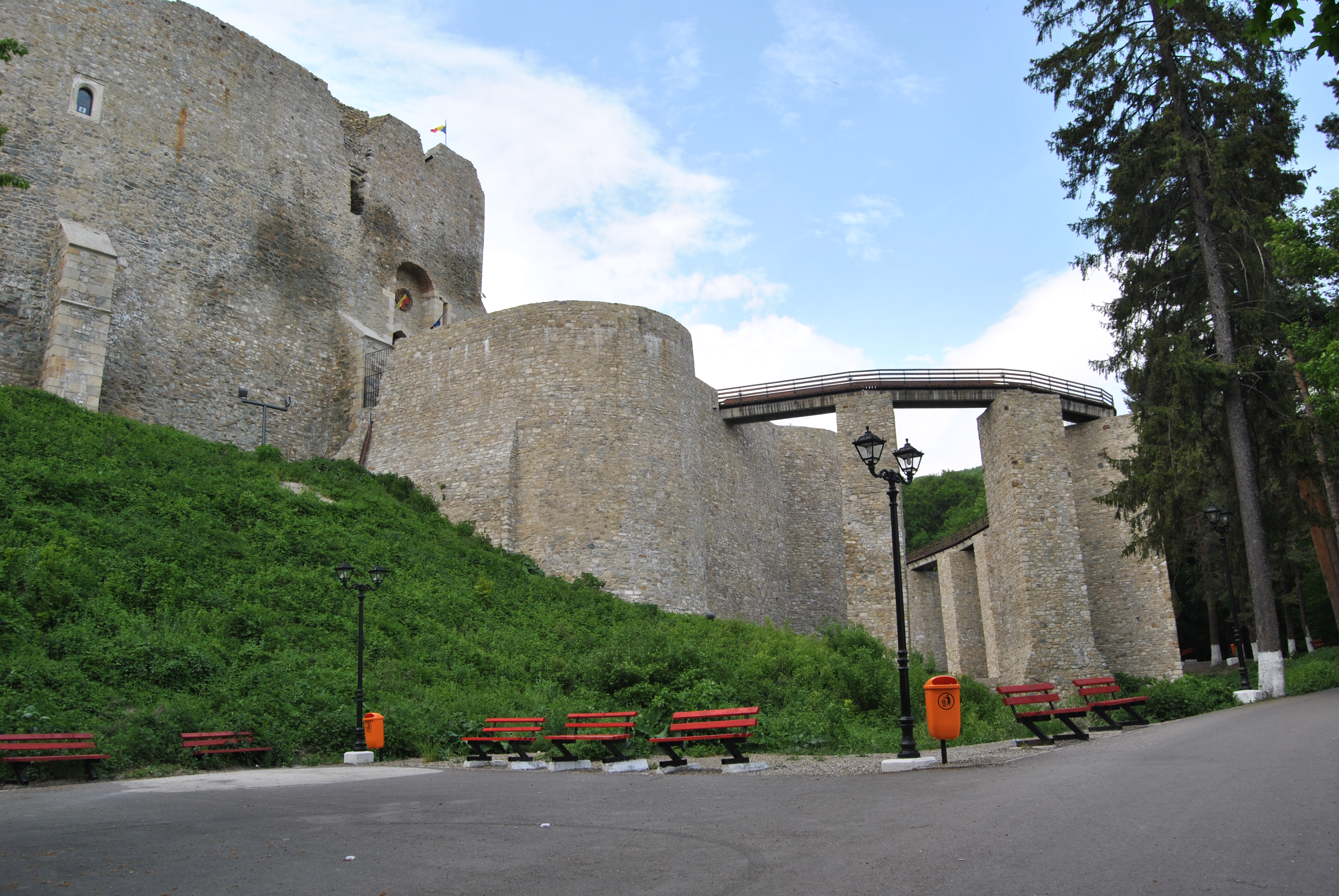
Road & access ramp to the Fortress

Neamț Citadel (Romanian: Cetatea Neamț or Cetatea Neamțului, pronunciation: [ne̯amts]) is a medieval fortress located in north-eastern Romania, near Târgu Neamț, in Neamț County. It was built in 14th-century Moldavia, during Peter II's reign, and expanded in the 15th-century. The citadel played a key role in Stephen the Great's defense system, along with Suceava, Hotin, Soroca, Orhei, Tighina, Chilia and Cetatea Albă.

== History ==
A lack of reliable information on the origins of Neamț Fortress has resulted in several hypotheses, whose reliability was often questioned. A number of historians and philologists, such as A.D. Xenopol and B.P. Hasdeu considered that - according to the Papal Bull of 1232 - the Teutonic kinghts of Bârsa had built a castrum muntissimum between 1211 and 1225 on the eastern slope of the Carpathians. This Germanic hypothesis was acquired by many Romanian historians and sustained by both the site's onomastic "Neamț", which in Slavic and Romanian means " German", and by the fortification style, typical of the German military architecture of the Hohenstaufen period. The Saxons had been appointed to fortify the Carpathian passes against the frequent incursions into Transylvania, thus Romanian historians connected the early German colonists, who arrived in the twelfth century, to the construction of the castle in the early thirteenth century.

Archaeological research of the citadel site has not revealed any evidence of a fortification being erected before the reign of Prince Peter II (1375-1391), thus refuting the Germanic hypothesis. The oldest coins discovered on the site are from the same reign too. The name is probably related to the Neamț Monastery, which was also constructed in the 14th-century.

The fortress was a key staging point of the Battle of Ghindăoani in 1395, during which Hungarian troops seeking to pacify the Principality of Moldavia, besieged the fortress for several days. It also withstood the Ottoman siege of Mehmed the Conqueror in 1476.

== Rehabilitation ==
Neamț Citadel was rehabilitated between 2007 and 2009 with European Union funds, through the 2004-2006 Economic and Social Cohesion Program, to which funds allocated by the Neamț County Council in partnership with the Târgu Neamț Local Council were added. The European funds were the majority, with the two institutions from Neamț County having a contribution of 10% of the value of the works. The feasibility study and technical project were prepared by a team led by architects Gheorghe Sion and Corneliu Constantin from the Institute of Historical Monuments Bucharest, and the contractors were SC Iasicon SA Iași and SC Proconsult Company SRL Pașcani.

The following works were carried out: modernisation of the access road, starting with Ștefan cel Mare Street, 1 Decembrie Street, and ending with Aleea Cetății, restoration of the entire architectural ensemble, illumination of the access roads and the monument, construction of new buildings to meet the functional requirements, development of the three existing parking lots near the citadel, water supply and sewerage.

Neamț Citadel was restored to the national and international tourist circuit on 4 July 2009. There are 21 rooms fitted out, including the hall of council and courtroom, the armoury, the prison, the store room, the dining room, the chapel, etc. In some rooms, the atmosphere of the past, when the citadel was inhabited, is recreated. In the room used as a prison, there are four mannequins depicting villains in chains.

== Description ==
Neamț Citadel is built of river stone (used both as elevation and infill for the walls), quarry stone (used for arches, ledges, pillars, and buttresses) and greenish sandstone rock. Between the fortress and the rest of the plateau is a defensive ditch on the north side. The fortress was entered through a gate called the "Mușatin Gate" located in the middle of the northern wall.

The Mușatin Fort has the shape of a quadrangle with unequal sides; the north side is 38.50 m, the south side 37.50 m, the east side 47 m and the west side 40 m. The walls are almost 3 m thick and were originally about 12-15 m high, supported and reinforced on the outside by 18 strong prismatic buttresses, which correspond to the direction of the inner walls. In the four corners of the Mușatin Fort there are defense towers, which are not placed outside the walls, as in the fortresses of Suceava and Șcheia built in the same period, but directly embedded in the framework of the walls.

In the middle of the fort was a large inner courtyard, surrounded by rooms for various purposes:

- on the east side were the prison, the mint, the store room and the cuhnea (kitchen) - on the ground floor and basement, the "black dungeon", the "Sf. Nicolae" chapel, the living room, the chamber of the jail-keeper and the room for the citadel’s ladies - upstairs.
- on the west side were the armoury - on the basement and ground floor, the council and judgment hall, a passage hall, an alcove and a secret room - upstairs
- on the south side there was a lapidarium - on the basement and ground floor and a terrace - upstairs
- on the north side there were no rooms, only the enclosure wall

The rooms in the towers had ceilings supported on thick oak beams, while the others had vaulted brick arches. There was a well in the inner courtyard. Most of the rooms in the fortress were for soldiers, as the fortress was used for defense, and the ruler, his family and close advisers only inhabited it in case of danger. It was usually inhabited by about 300 persons. The fortress was vulnerable on the north side, so a fairly deep trench was dug between the fortress walls and the Pleș Peak, which ran through the immediate vicinity of the wall, as archaeological excavations have shown.

Stephen the Great (Ștefan cel Mare) ordered the elevation of the fortress walls by about 6-7 meters and the construction of a wall flanked by four semicircular bastions on the north side of the fortress. This wall enclosed an outer courtyard.

In order to prevent the enemies from approaching the walls of the fortress, and to avoid placing catapults in the vicinity, Ștefan cel Mare cut the connection from the north ridge of the hill through a defense ditch. The fortress was entered through an arched access bridge, with a fixed and a movable part, supported on 11 prismatic stone pillars about 8 m high. The movable part was located on the portion of the bridge between the last pillar and the bastion wall, and could be raised in case of danger by a pulley system, but once past it, there were two traps with hatches, also known as "rattraps". The entrance to the Mușatin Fort was through a Gothic gate shaped in a broken arch, in the north-east tower.

Initially, the fortress was reached by a road that went around the Cerdac peak, on which there were "părcane" (type of defensive structures), in the form of ditches reinforced with palisades. The present road was not built until 1834, during the reign of Mihail Sturdza.

== Gallery ==
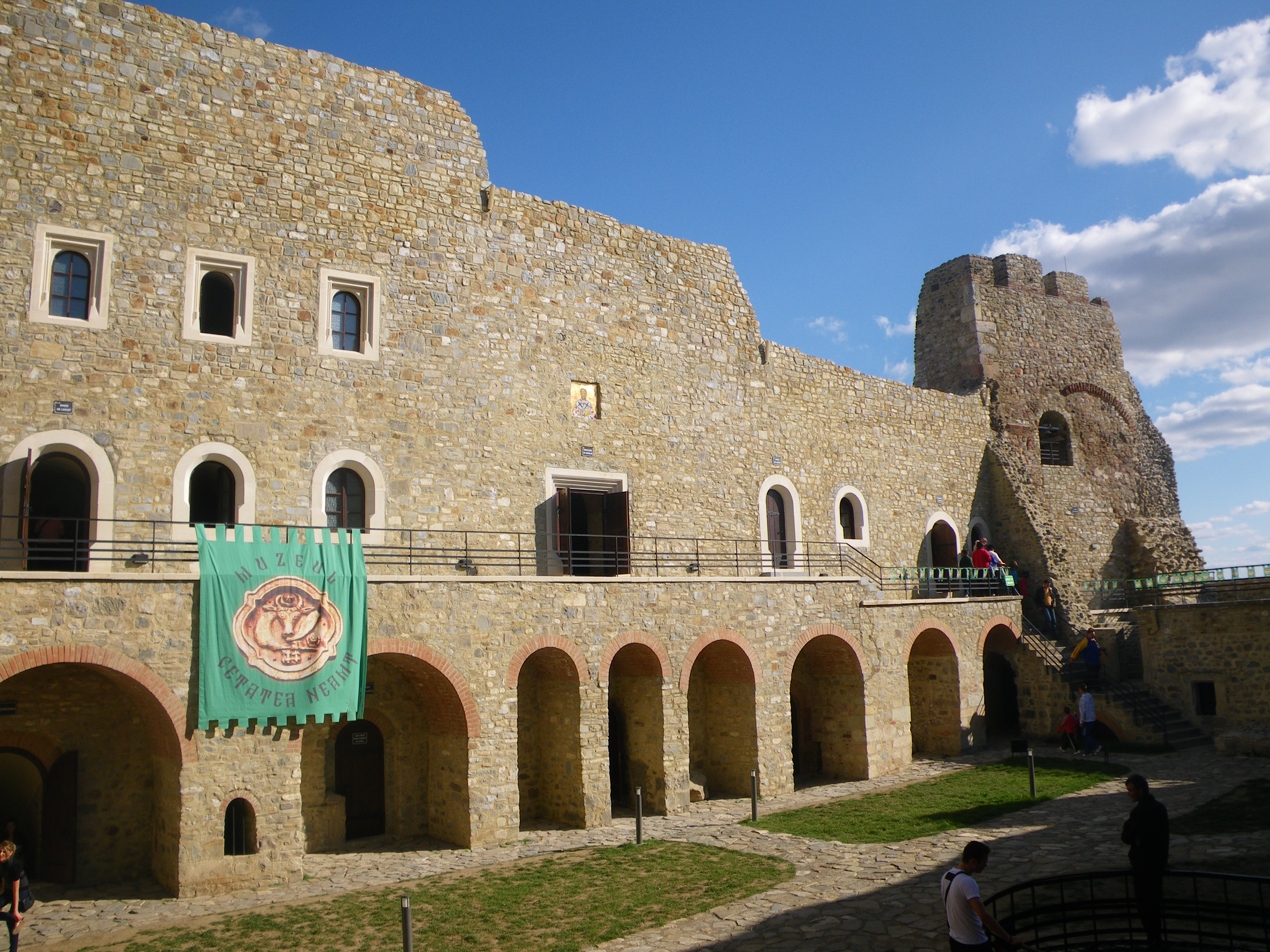
Inner Court

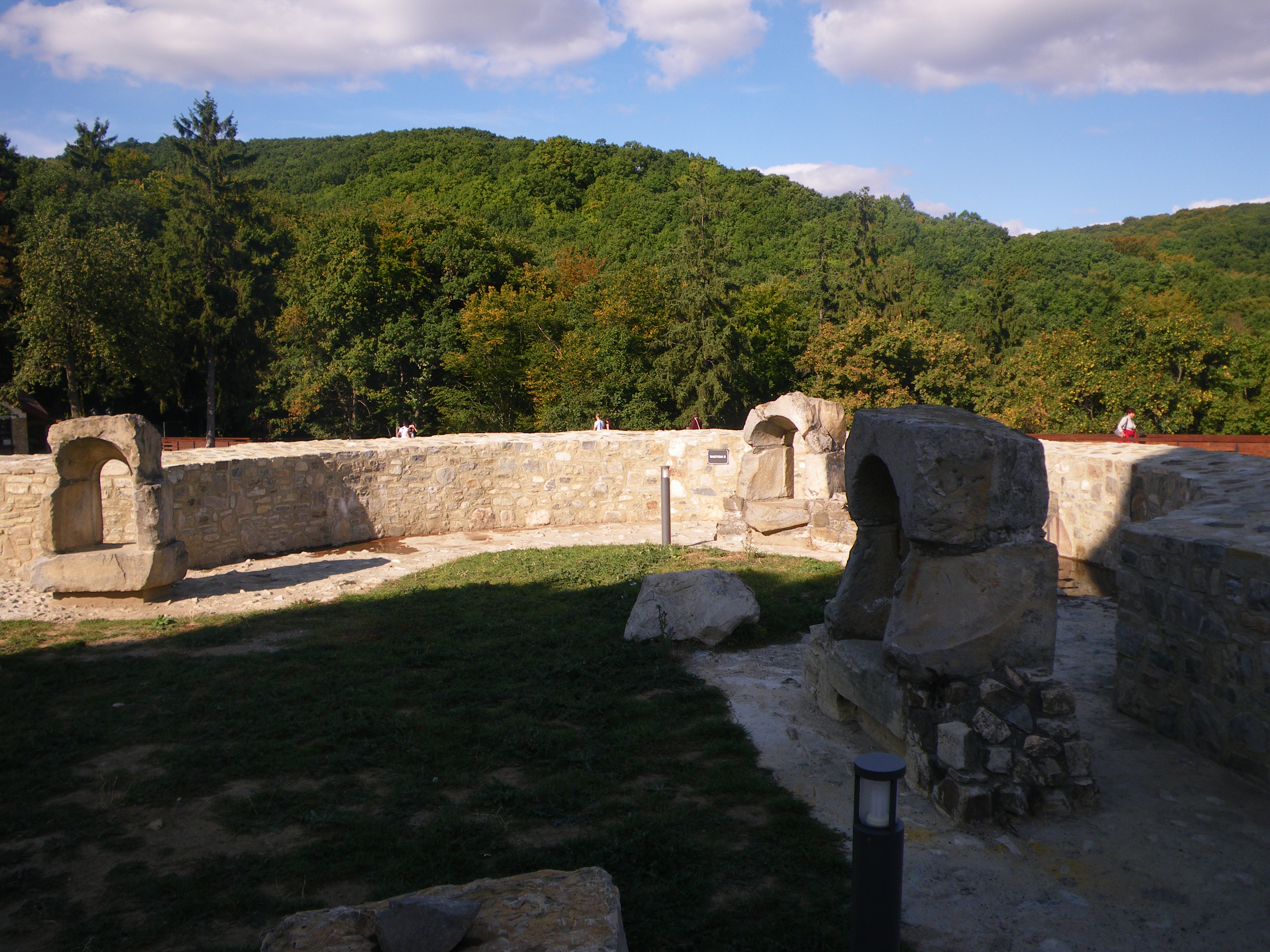

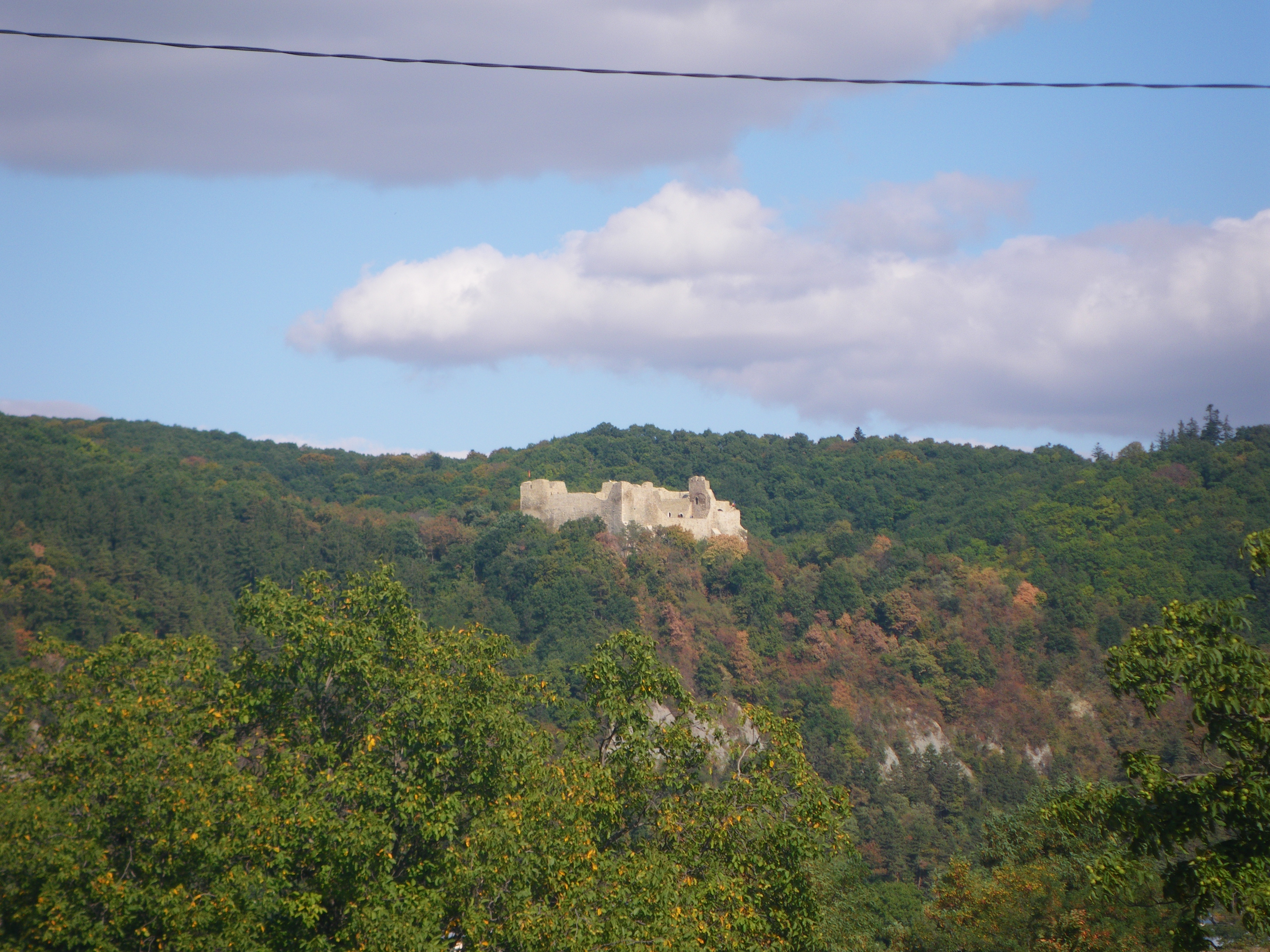
Neamţ Citadel

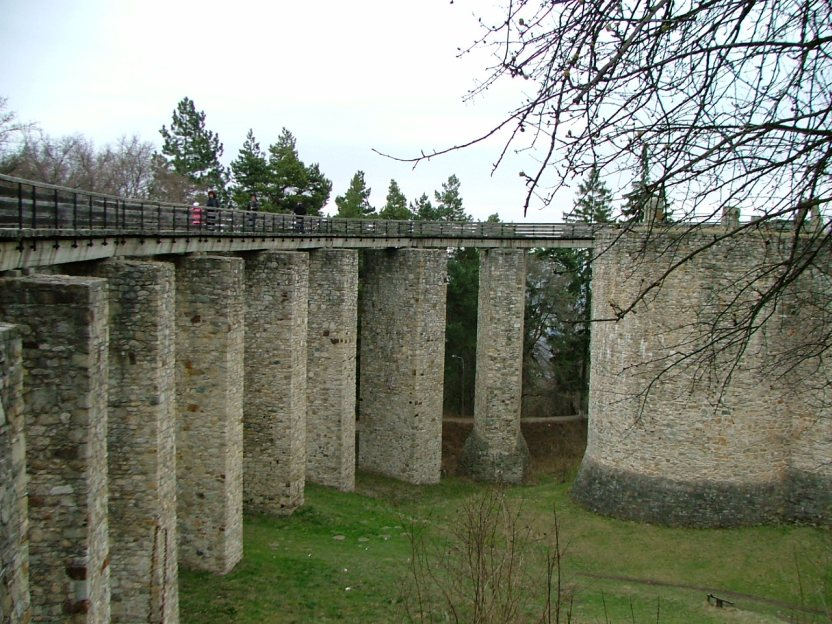
The access bridge in the fortress

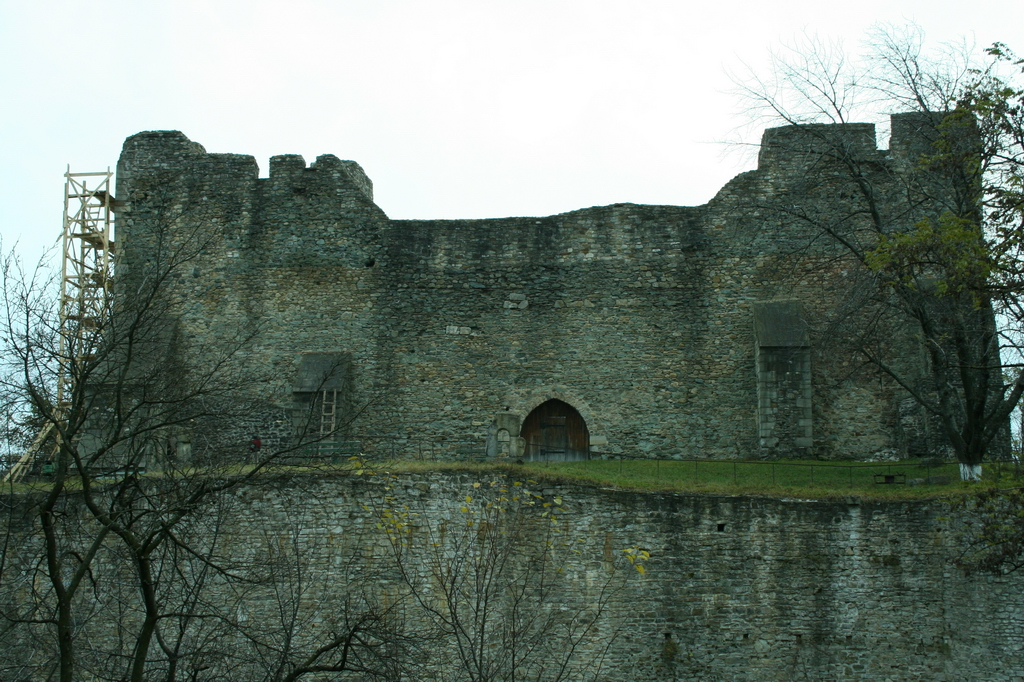
The Northern Wall

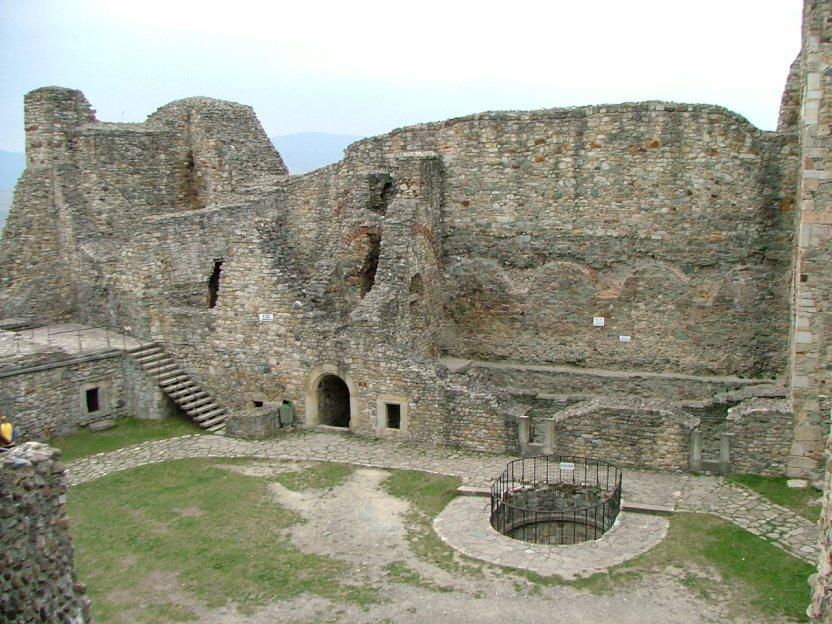
The Western wall

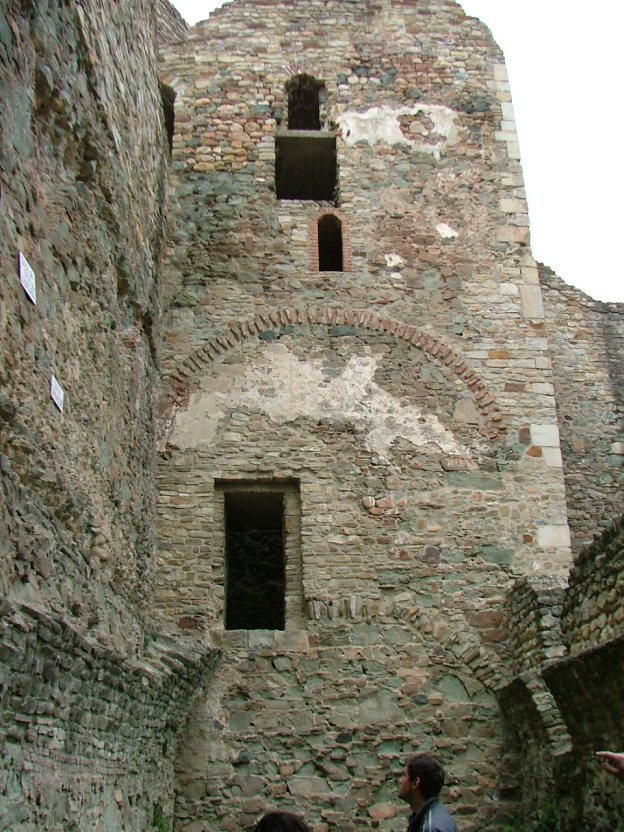
The tower in the northwest corner

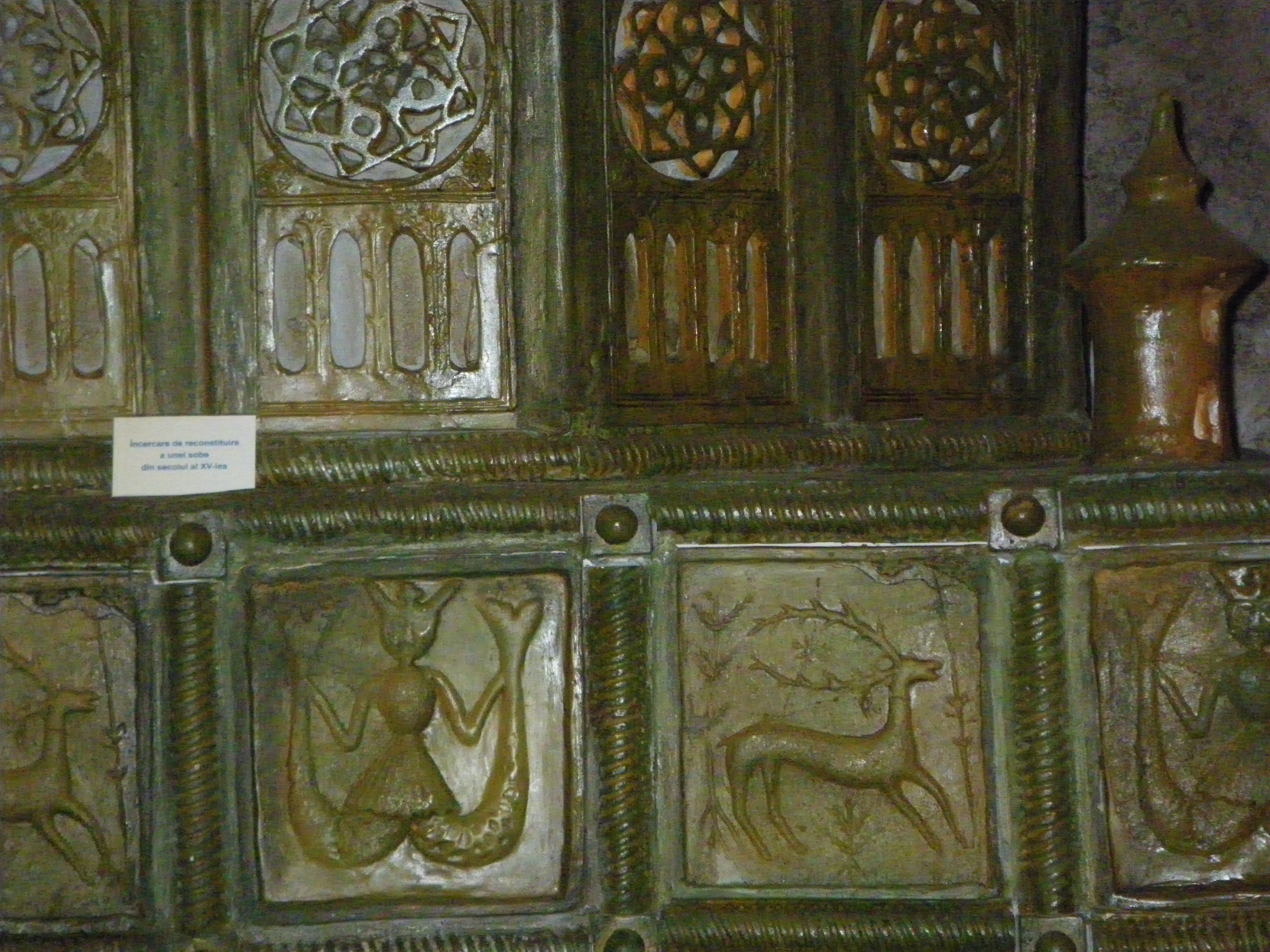
Tiles from Neamț Citadel

== See also ==
- List of castles in Romania
- Tourism in Romania
