= Tupilați =

- Commune
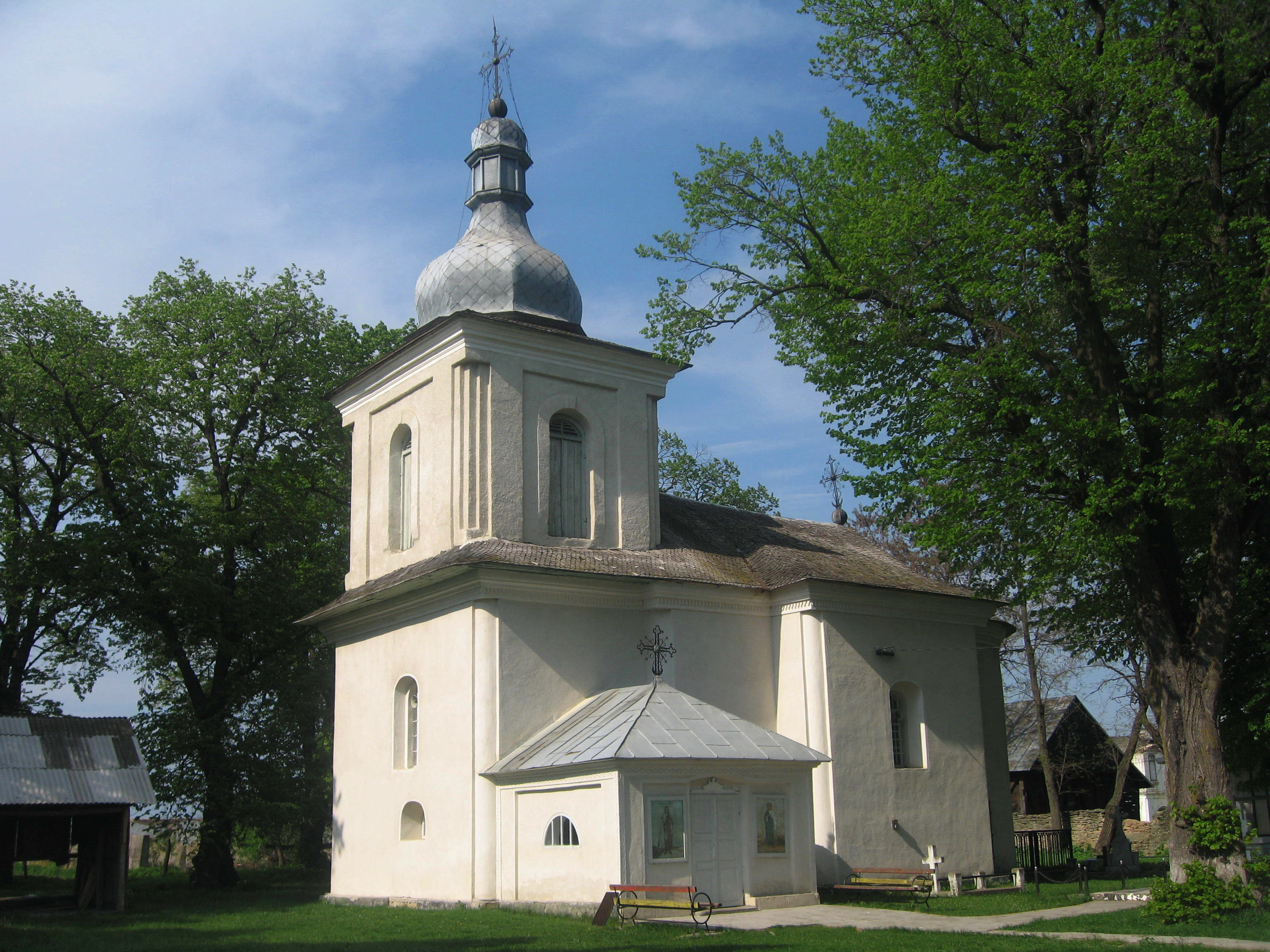
- Church in Tupilați

- Location in Neamț County

- Location in Romania
- Coordinates: 47.0807°N 26.6444°E
- Country: Romania
- County: Neamț

Government
  - Mayor (2020–2024): Petru Gherghel (PSD)
- Area: 32.16 km^{2} (12.42 sq mi)
- Elevation: 254 m (833 ft)
- Population (2021-12-01): 1,991
  - Density: 61.91/km^{2} (160.3/sq mi)
- Time zone: UTC+02:00 (EET)
  - Summer (DST): UTC+03:00 (EEST)
- Postal code: 617480
- Area code: +(40) 233
- Vehicle reg.: NT
- Website: www.primaria-tupilati.ro

Tupilați is a commune in Neamț County, Western Moldavia, Romania. It is composed of four villages: Arămoaia, Hanul Ancuței, Totoiești, and Tupilați.

Historical population
Year	Pop.	±%
1992	2,400	—
2002	2,419	+0.8%
2011	2,186	−9.6%
2021	1,991	−8.9%
Source: Census data
