= Athleta Christi =

Class of Early Christian soldier martyrs

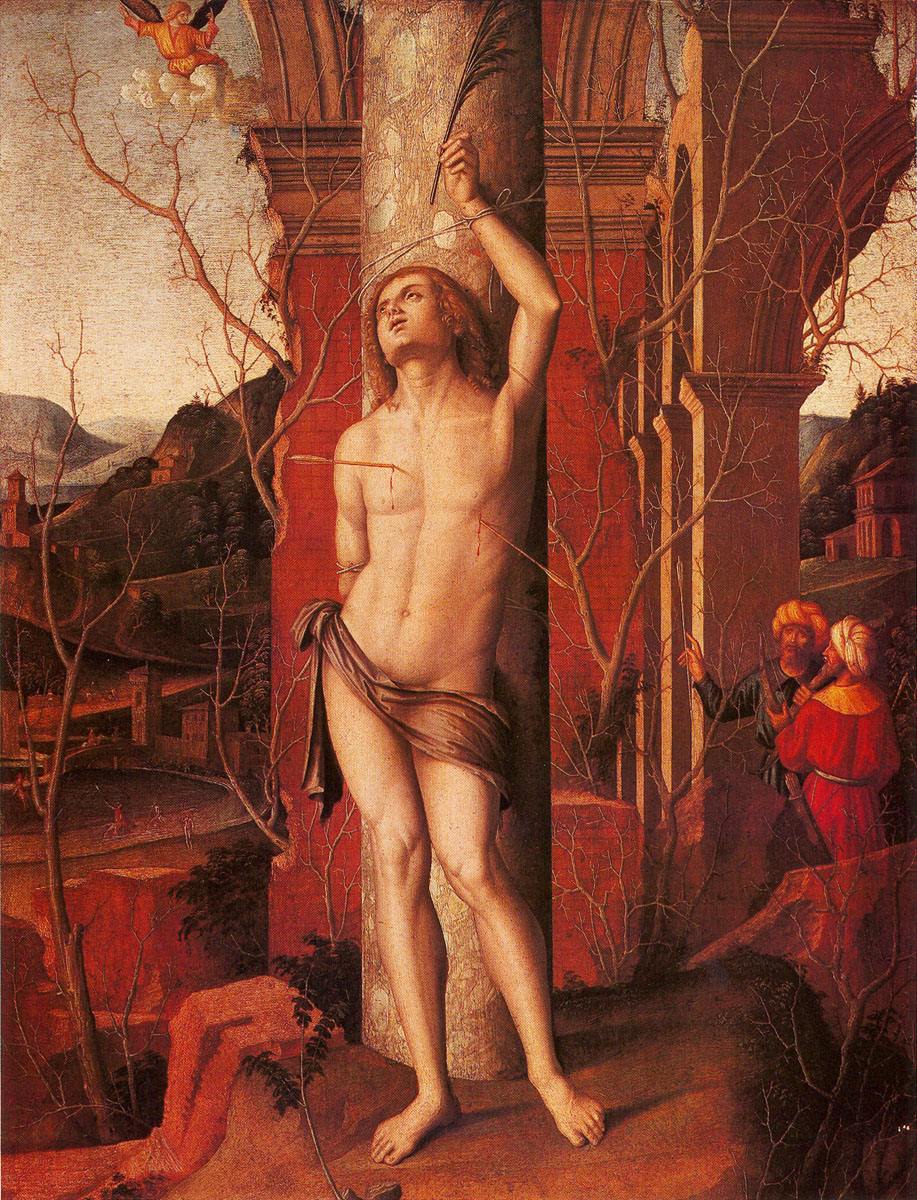
Saint Sebastian, a famous example

Athleta Christi (Latin: "Champion of Christ") was a class of Early Christian soldier martyrs or military saints, of whom the most familiar examples are Saint Sebastian and Saint George. It also could be used to refer to Christians with exemplary martial prowess, especially when fighting against non-Christians or heretics.

== Usage ==
Since the 15th century, the title has been a political one, granted by Popes to men who have led military campaigns defending Christianity. The militant Catholic hymn Athleta Christi nobilis ("Noble Champion of the Lord"), a hymn for Matins on 18 May, the feast of Saint Venantius, written in the 17th century by an unknown author, popularized the term. The medieval precursors of the hymn are numerous and include hymns, responsories and antiphons dedicated to many saints and martyrs, even non-militant ones such as Cosmas and Damian.

Those who have held the title include:

- Simon de Montfort, called by Peter of Vaux de Cernay.
- Ferdinand III of Castile, called by Popes Gregory IX and Innocent IV.
- Louis IX of France, called by Pope Innocent IV.
- Louis I of Hungary, called by Pope Innocent VI.
- John Hunyadi of Transylvania, called by Pope Pius II.
- George Kastrioti Skanderbeg of Albania, called by Popes Callixtus III, Pius II, Paul II, and Nicholas V.
- Stephen the Great of Moldavia, called by Pope Sixtus IV.
- Vlad the Impaler of Wallachia, called by Pope Sixtus IV.

== See also ==
- Miles Christianus
