= Alexandru I =

Alexandru I may refer to:

- Alexander the Good (Voivode of Moldavia between 1400 and 1432)
- Alexandru I Aldea (1397–1436)
