= Vlad Dracul House =

Birthplace of Vlad the Impaler

Coordinates: 46.2194347°N 24.7916553°E

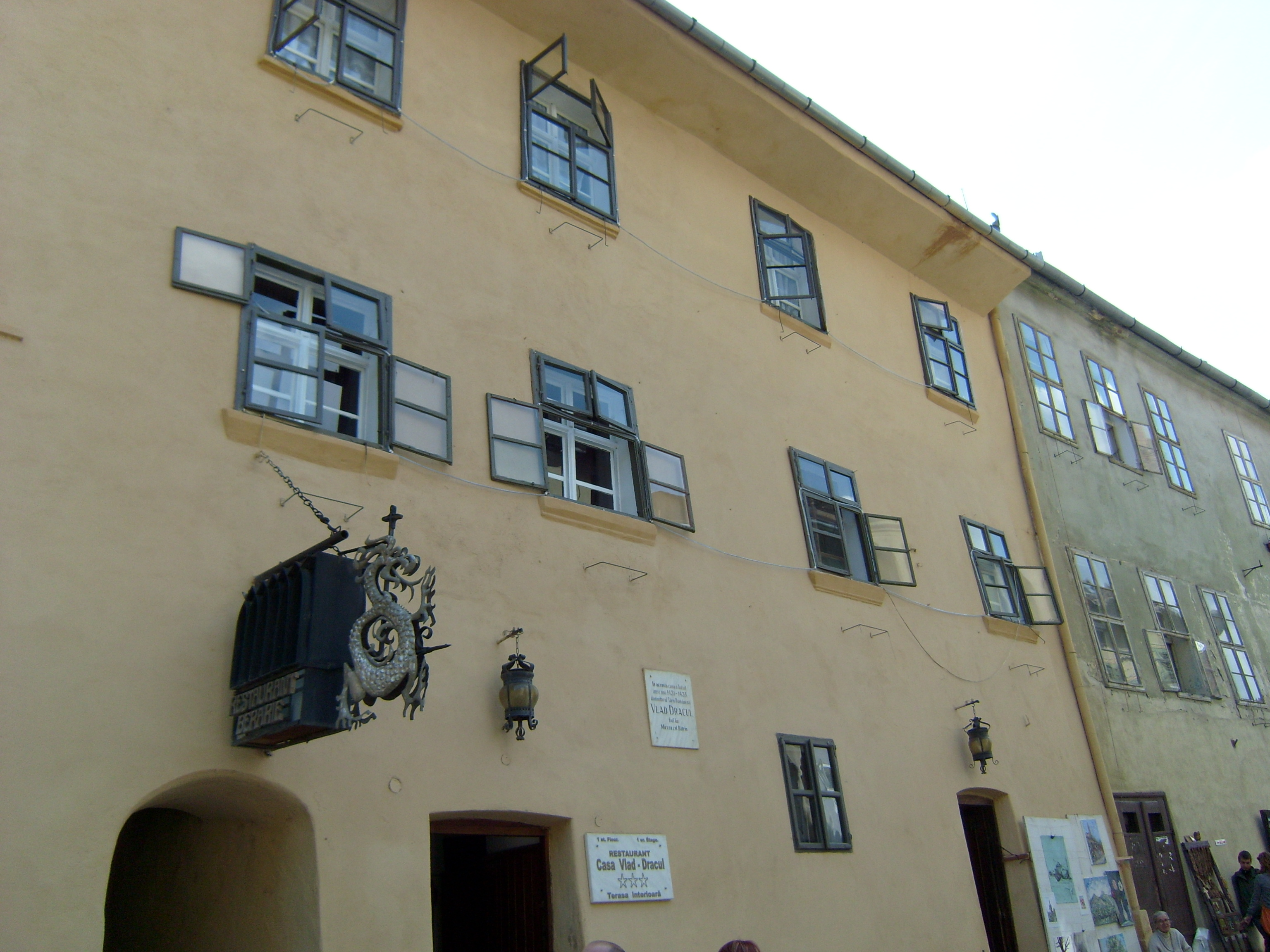
Vlad Dracul House

Vlad Dracul House of Sighișoara is located in Tin Street No.1, between the Citadel Square and the Clock Tower. It is the place where Vlad the Impaler, the historical character who inspired Bram Stoker's Dracula, was born, in 1431. His father, Vlad Dracul, the ruler of Wallachia, and his pregnant wife were hosted in this house by the mayor of Sighișoara between 1431 and 1435, during the Turkish invasion of Wallachia. It appears to be the oldest stone structure in the city, judging by the cylindrical river stone vault rising from the ground floor. Today the Vlad Dracul House hosts a medieval-style restaurant on the ground floor and a tiny weapon museum on the first floor.
