= Vlad II Dracul =

Ruler of Wallachia (r. 1436–1442, 1443–1447)

- Voivode of Wallachia
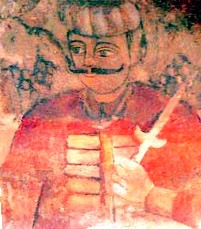

Voivode of Wallachia
- Reign: 1436 – 1442
- Predecessor: Alexander I Aldea
- Successor: Mircea II

Voivode of Wallachia
- Reign: 1443 – 1447
- Predecessor: Basarab II of Wallachia
- Successor: Vladislav II of Wallachia
- Born: c. 1395
- Died: November 1447 (aged 51–52); Bălteni, Principality of Wallachia
- Burial: Dealu Monastery, Dâmbovița County
- Spouse: Doamna Eupraxia of Moldavia; Doamna Călțuna ?
- Issue: Mircea II of Wallachia; Vlad III the Impaler; Radu III the Fair; Vlad IV the Monk; Alexandra of Wallachia
- House: House of Drăculești
- Father: Mircea I of Wallachia
- Religion: Eastern Orthodox

Vlad II (Romanian: Vlad al II-lea), also known as Vlad Dracul (Vlad al II-lea Dracul) or Vlad the Dragon (before 1395 – November 1447), was Voivode of Wallachia from 1436 to 1442, and again from 1443 to 1447. He is internationally known as the father of Vlad the Impaler, or Dracula. Born an illegitimate son of Mircea I of Wallachia, he spent his youth at the court of Sigismund of Luxembourg, who made him a member of the Order of the Dragon in 1431 (hence his sobriquet). Sigismund also recognized him as the lawful Voivode of Wallachia, allowing him to settle in nearby Transylvania. Vlad could not assert his claim during the life of his half-brother, Alexander I Aldea, who acknowledged the suzerainty of the Ottoman Sultan, Murad II.

After Alexander Aldea died in 1436, Vlad seized Wallachia with Hungarian support. Following the death of Sigismund of Luxembourg in 1437, Hungary's position weakened, causing Vlad to pay homage to Murad II, which included participating in Murad II's invasion of Transylvania in the summer of 1438. John Hunyadi, Voivode of Transylvania, came to Wallachia to convince Vlad to join a crusade against the Ottomans in 1441. After Hunyadi routed an Ottoman army in Transylvania, the sultan ordered Vlad to come to Edirne where he was captured in 1442. Hunyadi invaded Wallachia and made Vlad's cousin, Basarab II, voivode.

Vlad was released before the end of the year but was forced to leave his two young sons as hostages in the Ottoman court. He was restored in Wallachia with Ottoman support in 1443. He remained neutral during Hunyadi's "Long Campaign" against the Ottoman Empire between October 1443 and January 1444, but he sent 4,000 horsemen to fight against the Ottomans during the Crusade of Varna. With the support of a Burgundian fleet, he captured the important Ottoman fortress at Giurgiu in 1445. He made peace with the Ottoman Empire in 1446 or 1447, which contributed to the deterioration of his relationship with Hunyadi. Hunyadi invaded Wallachia, forcing Vlad to flee from Târgoviște in late November, where he was killed at a nearby village.

== Early life ==
Vlad's early life is poorly documented. He was born before 1395, and was one of the numerous illegitimate sons of Mircea I of Wallachia. Vlad's modern biographers agree that he was sent as a hostage to Sigismund of Luxembourg, King of Hungary, in 1395 or 1396. Sigismund mentioned that Vlad had been educated at his court, suggesting that he spent his youth in Buda, Nuremberg and other major towns of Hungary and the Holy Roman Empire.

Mircea I died in 1418, and his only legitimate son (and co-ruler), Michael, succeeded him. Two years later, Michael died fighting against his cousin, Dan II (the son of Mircea I's elder brother, Dan I). During the following decade, Dan II and Vlad's half-brother, Radu II Praznaglava, were fighting against each other for Wallachia.

Vlad left Buda for Poland without Sigismund's authorization in early 1423, but was captured before reaching the border. Before long, Sigismund acknowledged Dan II as the lawful ruler of Wallachia. The Byzantine historian, Doukas, recorded that Vlad was "an officer in the army" of the Byzantine Emperor, John VIII Palaiologos, and he "had access" to the imperial palace in Constantinople. Historian Radu Florescu says that Sigismund had appointed Vlad to receive John VIII (who had come to Italy to seek assistance against the Ottomans) in Venice in 1423, and Vlad accompanied the emperor back to Constantinople. After realizing that John VIII could not help him to seize Wallachia, Vlad returned to Hungary in 1429.

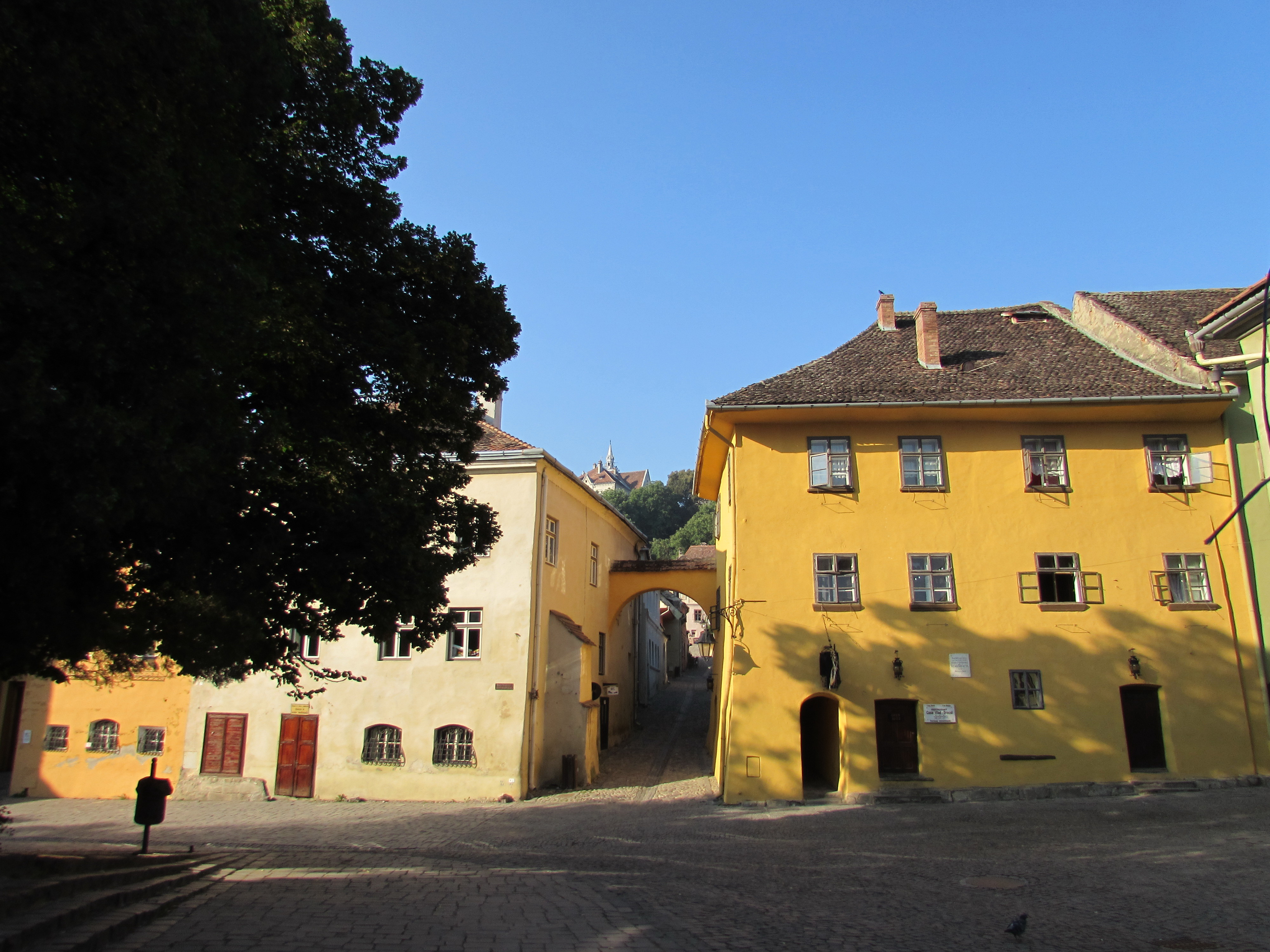
The Vlad Dracul House in the main square of Sighișoara where Vlad Dracul lived in the early 1430s

Sigismund made Vlad a first-class member of the Order of the Dragon (a chivalric order established by Sigismund) in Nuremberg on 8 February 1431. Other first-class members included Alfonso V of Aragon and Vytautas, Grand Duke of Lithuania. The dragon-shaped badge of the order gave rise to his Romanian sobriquet, Dracul ("the Dragon"), for which his sons became known as Dracula ("son of Dracul"). Vlad swore fealty to Sigismund who declared him the lawful prince of Wallachia. Vlad had to promise that he would protect the Roman Catholic Church. However, Sigismund did not assist him to seize Wallachia. In the summer, Vlad's half-brother, Alexander I Aldea, invaded Wallachia with Moldavian support and dethroned Dan II.

Vlad did not abandon his claim to Wallachia and settled in Transylvania. A Neo-Renaissance mural in a three-storey house in the main square of Sighișoara (which was uncovered on the 500th anniversary of the death of Vlad Dracul's son, Dracula) may depict Vlad Dracul after an original painting, according to Radu Florescu. The mural depicts a corpulent man with oval-shaped eyes and long moustaches wearing a white turban.

Alexander I Aldea went to Adrianople to do homage to the Ottoman Sultan, Murad II, in 1432. Vlad wanted to invade Wallachia with the support of Wallachian boyars (or noblemen) who had fled to Transylvania, but Alexander Aldea's principal official, Albu, prevented the invasion. Sigismund authorized Vlad to buy weapons and muster an army of exiled boyars only in 1434. In 1435, Alexander Aldea fell seriously ill and never recovered. Taking advantage of his brother's illness, Vlad broke into Wallachia, but Alexander Aldea and his Ottoman allies forced him to retreat.

== Reign ==
=== First rule ===
Lands ruled around 1390 by Vlad Dracul's father, Mircea I of Wallachia

Alexander Aldea died in autumn 1436, enabling Vlad Dracul to seize Wallachia with Hungarian support. He did not dismiss his predecessor's officials with the exception of Albu, who thus became his enemy. Vlad did not confirm the treaty that Alexander Aldea had concluded with the Ottomans, provoking an Ottoman incursion against Wallachia in November.

Vlad's patron, Sigismund of Luxembourg, died on 9 December 1437. Sigismund's death and the uprising of the Transylvanian peasants weakened Hungary, forcing Vlad to seek reconciliation with the Ottoman Empire. He went to Edirne and swore fealty to Murad II. He also promised to pay a yearly tribute to the sultan and to support the Ottomans' military campaigns at the sultan's order. Before long, Murad II decided to invade Hungary and gathered his troops at Vidin.

Albert of Habsburg (who was Sigismund of Luxembourg's son-in-law and successor) wrote a letter to Vlad, ordering him to protect Transylvania. Ignoring the king's command, Vlad joined Murad II who came to Wallachia at the head of his army in summer 1438, serving the sultan as his guide. The Ottoman and Wallachian troops broke into Hungary at Orșova. They routed the army of a local Vlach kenez, Cândea, near Hațeg. They marched along the river Mureș, capturing Câlnic and Sebeș. At Sebeș, Vlad convinced the leaders of the town to give in without resistance, promising to protect their property if they accompanied him to Wallachia. The Ottomans and Wallachians laid siege to Sibiu, but the siege lasted only for 8 days. They destroyed the outskirts of Brașov, before they left Hungary loaded with plunder and taking more than 30,000 captives.

After the Ottoman army left Wallachia, Vlad offered Albert of Habsburg to set the burghers who had been captured at Sebeș free, but the king (who regarded them traitors) refused his offer. Vlad's attempts to maintain a balance between Hungary and the Ottomans made both the king and the sultan suspicious about his true intentions. Albert allowed a pretender to the Wallachian throne, Basarab (who was a son of Dan II) to settle in Hungary. The Ottomans strengthened the fortress of Giurgiu and sent new troops to garrison the town.

Albert of Habsburg died on 27 October 1439. The majority of the Hungarian noblemen elected Władysław III of Poland king in early 1440. Władysław made the talented military commander, John Hunyadi, voivode of Transylvania in February 1441. Hunyadi who decided to restore the influence of Hungary in Wallachia ordered the burghers of Brașov to mint coins for Vlad around 15 October. Two or three weeks later, Hunyadi came to Târgoviște to meet Vlad, demanding him to join a crusade against the Ottoman Empire.

After Hunyadi defeated the Ottomans in Transylvania in March 1442, the Ottoman governor of Bulgaria accused Vlad of treachery, according to the contemporaneous Ottoman historian, Neşri. Murad summoned Vlad to Edirne to demonstrate his loyalty. Before departing, Vlad made his eldest son, Mircea, the ruler of Wallachia. Soon after he came to Edirne, he was captured at the sultan's command. He was held in captivity in Gallipoli.

=== Captivity and second rule ===
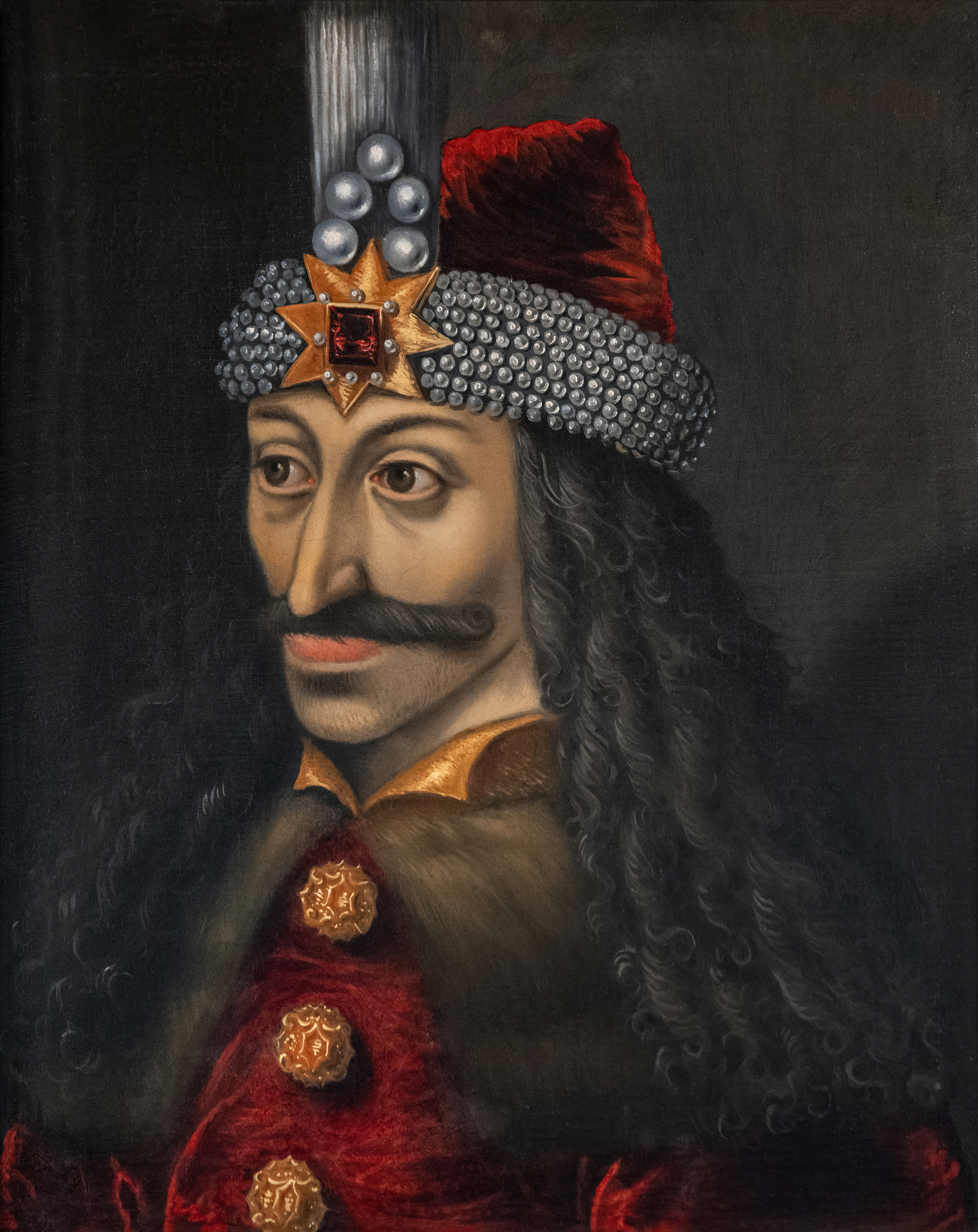
Vlad Dracul's son, Vlad the Impaler (or Dracula)

Murad sent Hadım Şehabeddin, Beylerbey (or governor) of Rumelia, to annex Wallachia in August 1442. Hunyadi annihilated the Ottoman army in the Carpathian Mountains in September, and made Vlad's cousin, Basarab, voivode of Wallachia. Before the end of the year, Murad II released Vlad. Vlad had to pledge that he would not support the enemies of the Ottoman Empire and he would pay an annual tribute and send 500 Wallachian boys to serve as janissaries in the sultan's army. He was also forced to leave his two sons, Vlad and Radu, as hostages in the Ottoman Empire.

The circumstances of Vlad's return to Wallachia are unknown. He regained his throne between March and September 1443. During Hunyadi's "Long Campaign" against the Ottoman Empire, which lasted from October 1443 to January 1444, Vlad remained neutral, especially because the sultan promised the release of his two sons. In the ensuing peace negotiations between Hungary and the Ottoman Empire, Murad II was willing to release Vlad from his obligation to personally visit his court, but the papal legate, Julian Cesarini, prevented the ratification of the peace treaty. Instead, he urged Władysław to continue the crusade against the Ottoman Empire. On the other hand, Vlad tried to dissuade Władysław III from waging war against the Ottomans, reminding him that Murad II went hunting with more retainers than Władysław had troops, according to the Polish historian, Jan Długosz. Nevertheless, he sent 4,000 horsemen under the command of his son, Mircea, to fight against the Ottomans.

The crusade ended with the catastrophic defeat of the crusaders in the Battle of Varna on 10 November 1444. After the battle Hunyadi wanted to return to Hungary through Wallachia, but he was captured by Wallachian soldiers at the Danube. Vlad only released him after Lawrence Héderváry, Palatine of Hungary, threatened him with a war. According to historian John Jefferson, Vlad held Hunyadi in captivity because he wanted to hand him over to the sultan. Camil Mureşanu writes that Hunyadi was only imprisoned because the soldiers who captured him did not recognize him. Historian Kurt W. Teptow says, Vlad held Hunyadi responsible for the catastrophe and almost killed him. After releasing Hunyadi, Vlad gave him precious gifts and accompanied him as far as the Hungarian border.

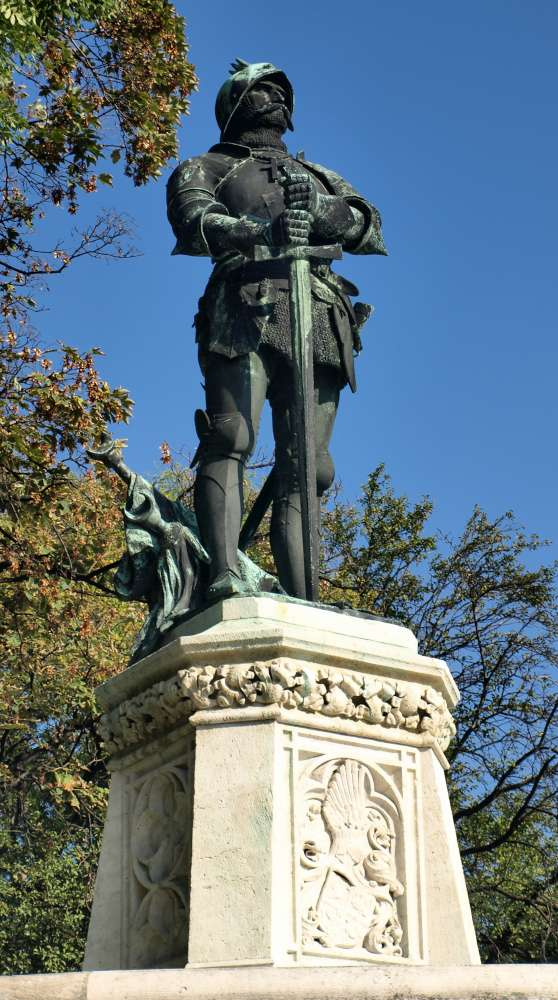
John Hunyadi, who dethroned Vlad Dracul in 1447 (a sculpture by István Tóth in Budapest)

A fleet of Burgundian crusaders attacked the Ottoman fleet on the Black Sea in the spring 1445. The commander of the fleet, Walerand of Wavrin, sent envoys to Hungary to start negotiations about a joint campaign against the Ottoman Empire. At Hunyadi's request, one of Wavrin's envoys, Pedro Vasque de Saavedra, visited Vlad and convinced him to meet Wavrin. In July, Vlad went to Isaccea where he made an alliance with Wavrin. Vlad mustered an army of 4,000–6,000 strong and placed it under the command of his son, Mircea.

The Burgundian and Wallachian army laid siege to Silistra in the middle of September, but they could not capture it. Before long, however, they conquered and destroyed the small fort at Tutrakan. Vlad convinced Wavrin to attack Giurgiu, saying that whenever the Ottomans "want to harry Wallachia or Transylvania, they and their horses can cross" the Danube near the fortified island at Giurgiu, connected to the Wallachian bank by a bridge. During the siege of Giurgiu, two iron rings of a large bombard suddenly broke, killing two soldiers, because Vlad, who was in the command of the fire, did not allow the bombard to cool down between blows. The Ottoman garrison of the fortress capitulated on the condition that they were allowed to freely leave for the Ottoman Empire. However, after they left the fortress, 2,000 Wallachian soldiers attacked and massacred them at Vlad's order, because he regarded the commander of the Ottoman garrison responsible for his captivity in 1442.

Before long, the Ottoman garrison at Ruse also capitulated. Vlad gave asylum to more than 11,000 Bulgarians who had rebelled against the Ottomans, assisting them to cross the Danube into Wallachia. The Burgundian crusaders and the Wallachians approached Nicopolis, where a Hungarian army under the command of John Hunyadi joined them on 14 September. However, an early frost forced the crusaders to abandon the campaign in October, because they feared that the Danube would freeze over.

The relationship between Wallachia and Hungary soon deteriorated. In a letter written late in 1445 to the townspeople of Brașov, Vlad complained that Wallachian merchants were arrested in Transylvania, although he had left his "little children to be butchered for Christian peace so that [he] and [his] country [could] be subjects" of the king of Hungary. His words evidence that he was convinced that his two sons had been murdered in the Ottoman Empire, but the sultan did not harm the boys. In 1446 or 1447, Vlad made peace with the Ottomans, even agreeing to return the Bulgarian refugees to the Ottoman Empire. He intervened in the fight for the Moldavian throne in favor of Roman II of Moldavia in July 1447. The Poles also supported Roman, but Roman's opponent, Peter III, was Hunyadi's protégé.

=== Death in captivity ===
On 20 July 1447, John Hunyadi ordered the burghers of Brașov to give shelter to a pretender to the Wallachian throne, Vladislav, who was a cousin of Vlad. Hunyadi unexpectedly broke into Wallachia in late November, taking with him Vladislav (also known as Dan). Vlad fled from Târgoviște, but he was captured and killed in the marshes at Bălteni. In a letter written on 4 December 1447, Hunyadi styled himself "voivode of the Transalpine land" (Wallachia) and referred to Târgoviște as his fortress, implying that he had taken control of Wallachia by that time. Hunyadi placed Vladislav on the throne of Wallachia.

=== Disputed burial place ===
The place of Vlad Dracul's burial has not been identified. Cazacu says, he was most probably buried in the Snagov Monastery. Florescu writes, Vlad Dracul was buried in a chapel in the Dealu Monastery near Târgoviște.

== Family ==
Ancestors of Vlad II Dracul of Wallachia

16. Basarab I of Wallachia
8. Nicholas Alexander of Wallachia
17. Marghita
4. Radu I of Wallachia
18. John Dobokai
9. Clara Dobokai
2. Mircea I of Wallachia
5. Kalinikia
1. Vlad II Dracul of Wallachia

According to a widely accepted scholarly theory, Vlad's wife was "Cneajna", a daughter of Alexander I of Moldavia. She was called Eupraxia, according to Florescu. Historian Matei Cazacu writes that she was his second wife. He does not identify Vlad's first wife. Vlad's descendants were known as Drăculești, because they adopted Vlad's sobriquet as their patronymic (Dracula). The conflict between the Drăculești and the Dănești (the descendants of Dan I of Wallachia), and strifes between the members of the Drăculești line contributed to the political instability in 15th-century Wallachia.

Vlad's eldest sons, Mircea and Vlad Dracula, were first mentioned in a charter of Vlad on 20 January 1437. Mircea was born in about 1428, Vlad between 1429 and 1431. Their brother (Vlad Dracul's third son), Radu the Fair, was born before 2 August 1439. Florescu writes that Vlad Dracul's daughter, Alexandra, married the Wallachian boyar Vintilă Florescu. Vlad Dracul also fathered illegitimate children. A Wallachian noblewoman, Călțuna, gave birth to Vlad the Monk. Almost no information is known about the life of another illegitimate son, Mircea.

== Sources ==
- Cazacu, Matei (1991). "The reign of Dracula in 1448". In Treptow, Kurt W. (ed.). Dracula: Essays on the Life and Times of Vlad Țepeș. East European Monographs, Distributed by Columbia University Press. pp. 53–61. ISBN 0-88033-220-4.
- Ciobanu, Veniamin (1991). "The equilibrium policy of the Romanian principalities in East-Central Europe, 1444–1485". In Treptow, Kurt W. (ed.). Dracula: Essays on the Life and Times of Vlad Țepeș. East European Monographs, Distributed by Columbia University Press. pp. 29–52. ISBN 0-88033-220-4.
- Engel, Pál (2001). The Realm of St Stephen: A History of Medieval Hungary, 895–1526. I.B. Tauris Publishers. ISBN 1-86064-061-3.
- Florescu, Radu R.; McNally, Raymond T. (1989). Dracula, Prince of Many Faces: His Life and his Times. Back Bay Books. ISBN 978-0-316-28656-5.
- Florescu, Radu R. (1991). "A genealogy of the family of Vlad Țepeș". In Treptow, Kurt W. (ed.). Dracula: Essays on the Life and Times of Vlad Țepeș. East European Monographs, Distributed by Columbia University Press. pp. 249–252. ISBN 0-88033-220-4.
- Jefferson, John (2012). The Holy Wars of King Wladislas and Sultan Murad: The Ottoman-Christian Conflict from 1438–1444. Brill. ISBN 978-90-04-21904-5.
- Hasan, Mihai Florin (2013). "Aspecte ale relaţiilor matrimoniale munteano-maghiare din secolele XIV-XV [Aspects of the Hungarian-Wallachian matrimonial relations of the fourteenth and fifteenth centuries]". Revista Bistriţei (in Romanian). XXVII. Cumplexul Muzeal Bistrița-Năsăud: 128–159. ISSN 1222-5096.
- Mureşanu, Camil (2001). John Hunyadi: Defender of Christendom. The Center for Romanian Studies. ISBN 973-9432-18-2.
- Treptow, Kurt W. (2000). Vlad III Dracula: The Life and Times of the Historical Dracula. The Center of Romanian Studies. ISBN 973-98392-2-3.

Vlad II Dracul House of Drăculești Born: before 1395 Died: November 1447
Regnal titles
Preceded by Alexandru I Aldea	Voivode of Wallachia; 1436 – 1442	Succeeded by Mircea II
Preceded by Basarab II	Voivode of Wallachia; 1443 – 1447	Succeeded by Vladislav II
