= Dan II =

Dan II may refer to:

- Dan II of Wallachia (? – 1432), voivode (prince) of the principality of Wallachia
- Dan II of Denmark
