= Alexander I Aldea =

Prince of Wallachia (r. 1431–36)

Prince of Wallachia
- Reign: March/June 1431 – December 1436
- Predecessor: Dan II
- Successor: Vlad II
- Born: 1397; Wallachia
- Died: December 1436 (aged 38–39); Wallachia
- Dynasty: House of Basarab
- Father: Mircea I of Wallachia
- Religion: Orthodox

Alexander I Aldea (1397 – December 1436) was a Voivode of Wallachia (1431–1436) from the House of Basarab, son of Mircea the Elder. He came to rule Wallachia during an extremely turbulent time when rule of the country changed hands by violence eighteen times during the 15th century. Alexander I took the throne by ousting Dan II of Wallachia, father to Basarab II. Dan II was on his 5th rule of Wallachia, having gone back and forth with Radu II several times over the course of seven years during the 1420s. He was strong enough to hold the throne for what was then a considerable time, a stretch of five years. However, in the winter of 1436 he died, most probably from illness, as there are no rumours to the contrary. Upon his death, his half-brother Vlad II Dracul assumed the throne and would hold it off and on until he was killed in 1447.

Alexander I was the uncle of Vlad Tepes (son of Vlad II Dracul).

Alexander I Aldea House of Basarab Born: 1397 Died: 1436
Regnal titles
Preceded by Dan II	Voivode of Wallachia; 1431–1436	Succeeded by Vlad II Dracul
