= Dan II of Wallachia =

Ruler of Wallachia (died 1432)

Dan II
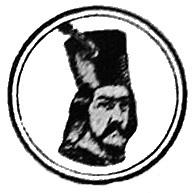

Prince of Wallachia
- Reign: August 1420 – May 1421
- Predecessor: Michael I of Wallachia
- Successor: Radu II of Wallachia
- Reign: November 1421 – Summer 1423; Summer 1423 – December 1424; May 1426 – January 1427
- Predecessor: Radu II of Wallachia
- Successor: Radu II of Wallachia
- Reign: Spring 1427 – June 1431
- Predecessor: Radu II of Wallachia
- Successor: Alexander I Aldea
- Born: unknown
- Died: 1 June 1431
- Issue: Vladislav II of Wallachia; Dan III of Wallachia; Basarab II of Wallachia
- Dynasty: House of Basarab
- Father: Dan I of Wallachia
- Mother: Maria of Serbia
- Religion: Orthodox

Dan II cel Viteaz (Note: According to a statue in Târgoviște. Cel Viteaz = ″courageous″) (? – 1 June 1432) was a voivode of the principality of Wallachia, ruling an extraordinary five times, and succeeded four times by Radu II Chelul, his rival for the throne. Of those five periods on the throne of Wallachia (1420–1421, 1421–1423, 1423–1424, 1426–1427, and 1427–1431), four were within a period of only seven years.

== Early life ==
Dan was the son of Dan I of Wallachia. His father was the eldest son and successor of Radu I of Wallachia. After Dan I was murdered in 1386, his brother, Mircea, ascended the throne. Dan was loyal to his uncle during Mircea's reign. Mircea was the first ruler of Wallachia to be forced to pay an annual tribute to the Ottoman Empire. He made his only legitimate son, Michael I, his co-ruler.Dan appears first in the records leading a contingent sent by his uncle Mircea I to assist Musa Celebi in taking Adrianople during the Ottoman civil war in 1411.

After Michael succeeded Mircea (who died on 31 January 1418), Dan laid claim to Wallachia. The Ottomans defeated Michael in 1419, forcing him to pay tribute and to cede Giurgiu and other fortresses along the Danube to them. The Wallachian boyars started to defect to Dan. After Michael did not respect his treaty with the Ottomans, Dan broke into Wallachia in early 1420. Initially, Michael could resist. However, Ottoman troops joined Dan, enabling him to defeat Michael and his Hungarian allies in the summer of 1420.

== Reign ==
Dan II first took the throne in 1420, losing it in 1421, but regaining it that same year. He was primarily able to regain the throne many times because he was an able military commander in the field. On 26 February 1423, Dan II led an army against the invading Ottoman Turks, defeating them in battle and killing approximately 36,000 of them. The Ottomans were invading in an effort to place Radu II back on the throne. In 1425, he again defeated the Ottomans, winning an important victory in a battle that was the first recorded mention of Wallachia using mercenaries in their army. In that battle, Dan II had employed a large number of Bulgarian soldiers. In the spring of 1427, Dan II removes Radu II from the throne for the last time, again defeating the Ottomans in battle, taking back the fortress at Giurgiu. In all likelihood, Dan II killed Radu II either during or after that battle, as the latter disappears from historical records afterwards. However, written accounts of the time are sparse at best, and it is not known for certain. On 3 June 1428, Dan II led an army against the Ottomans at Golubac Fortress, which ended with a treaty that would allow Dan II a semi-peaceful rule until 1431. Among the documents that have survived to the present with regard to his battles, one mentions a place called "Cecov", yet to be identified, either north or south of the Danube.

In June 1431 his country was invaded by a large Ottoman army. Dan was defeated and killed in battle. He was succeeded by Alexandru I Aldea, a son of Mircea cel Batran, who would reign until his death from illness in 1436, and with him being replaced by Vlad II Dracul, father to Vlad Tepes. Dan II's son, Basarab II, would replace Vlad Dracul's son Mircea II in 1443. However, his son lacked the military ability of his father and would lose the throne within a year to Vlad Dracul.

Infante Pedro, Duke of Coimbra, an indefatigable traveler, possibly the most well-traveled prince of his time, and brother of Henry the Navigator, met with Dan II of Wallachia during Pedro's service to Sigismund, Holy Roman Emperor.

== Sources ==
- Quellen zur Geschichte der Stadt Kronstadt in Siebenbürgen [Sources on the history of the city of Kronstadt] (in German), Brassó: Brassó, 1903
- Rezachevici, Constantin (2001). Cronologia critica a domnilor din Țara Româneasca și Moldova: a. 1324 - 1881 [Critical chronology of the lords of Wallachia and Moldavia: a. 1324 - 1881] (in Romanian). Vol. I, 14th-16th centuries. Bucharest: Editura Enciclopedică.
- Rezachevici, Constantin. (2001). Rolul românilor în apărarea Europei de expansiunea otomană. Secolele XIV-XV. Evoluția unui concept în contextul vremii (The role of the Romanians in defending Europe from the Ottoman expansion. 14th-15th centuries. The evolution of a concept in the context of the time) (in Romanian). Bucharest. Editura Albatros. pp. 185-187.
- Florescu, Radu R.; McNally, Raymond T. (1989). Dracula, Prince of Many Faces: His Life and his Times. Back Bay Books. ISBN 978-0-316-28656-5.
- Mureşanu, Camil (2001). John Hunyadi: Defender of Christendom. The Center for Romanian Studies. ISBN 973-9432-18-2.
- Pop, Ioan-Aurel (2005). "Romanians in the 14th-16th centuries: from the "Christian Republic" to the "Restoration of Dacia"". In Pop, Ioan-Aurel; Bolovan, Ioan (eds.). History of Romania: Compendium. Romanian Cultural Institute (Center for Transylvanian Studies). pp. 209–314. ISBN 978-973-7784-12-4.
- Treptow, Kurt W. (2000). Vlad III Dracula: The Life and Times of the Historical Dracula. The Center of Romanian Studies. ISBN 973-98392-2-3.*

== Notes ==
Dan II of Wallachia House of Basarab Died: 1 June 1432
Regnal titles
Preceded by Mihail I	Voivode of Wallachia; 1420–1421	Succeeded by Radu II Chelul
Preceded by Radu II Chelul	Voivode of Wallachia; 1421–1423	Succeeded by Radu II Chelul
Preceded by Radu II Chelul	Voivode of Wallachia; 1423–1424	Succeeded by Radu II Chelul
Preceded by Radu II Chelul	Voivode of Wallachia; 1426–1427	Succeeded by Radu II Chelul
Preceded by Radu II Chelul	Voivode of Wallachia; 1427–1431	Succeeded by Alexandru I Aldea
