= Basarab II of Wallachia =

Prince of Wallachia (died after 1443)

Basarab II

Prince of Wallachia
- Reign: June 1442 – March 1443
- Predecessor: Mircea II
- Successor: Vlad II Dracul
- Born: unknown
- Died: after 1443
- Issue: Basarab Țepeluș cel Tânăr
- House: House of Dănești
- Father: Dan II of Wallachia
- Religion: Orthodox

Basarab II was the Voivode of the principality of Wallachia (1442–1443), and the son of the former Wallachian ruler Dan II of Wallachia. Basarab II ruled during a turbulent time in Wallachia, now part of present-day Romania, with his rule falling between that of the father and son rule of Vlad Dracul and Mircea II. His reign was extremely short, as during that period only the strongest could retain their hold on the region for any great length of time. He took over as ruler in August 1442, holding on to it only until the Autumn of 1443, when Vlad Dracul forced him out.

During that time, the power of the Ottoman Empire became stronger with each year, making them a constant threat to independent Wallachia. Anyone who ruled Wallachia had not only the Ottomans to deal with, but the internal conflicts of their own people. Politics had to be juggled between maintaining good relations with the Hungarian Kingdom, who were often needed as powerful allies against the invasions of the Ottomans, as well as maintaining at least semi-friendly relations with the Ottomans themselves.

In 1442, Hungarian commander John Hunyadi defeated the Ottomans in battle, and placed Basarab II in power, forcing Vlad Dracul and his family to flee. However, the following year Vlad Dracul regained the throne with Ottoman support, based on a new treaty that had the conditions that he make the usual annual tribute, in addition to sending Wallachian boys each year to be trained for service in the Ottoman army. To further show his loyalty, he sent to the Sultan two of his sons, Vlad Țepeș and Radu cel Frumos, as hostages. The elder of the two boys would go on to become the inspiration for the novel Dracula, by Bram Stoker. Basarab II was not killed by Vlad Dracul when the latter restored his rule, however he would be buried alive during the second reign of Vlad Tepes.

Basarab II of Wallachia House of Dănești Born: before 1442 Died: 1458
Regnal titles
Preceded by Mircea II	Voivode of Wallachia; 1442–1443	Succeeded by Vlad II Dracul
