= Mircea II of Wallachia =

Prince of Wallachia, Romania (1428–1447)

Mircea II

Prince of Wallachia
- Reign: September – December 1442
- Predecessor: Vlad II Dracul
- Successor: Basarab II
- Born: 1428
- Died: 1447 (aged 18–19)
- House: Drăculești
- Father: Vlad II Dracul
- Religion: Orthodox

Mircea II (1428–1447) was the Voivode, or prince, of Wallachia in 1442. He was the oldest son of Vlad II Dracul and brother of Vlad Țepeș and Radu cel Frumos (Radu the Handsome). He was the grandson of his namesake Mircea the Elder.

Mircea II played an important role in the military conflicts of his time, particularly in the battles against the Ottoman Empire. He led Wallachian forces in several campaigns and was known for his bravery on the battlefield. However, his reign was very short due to political intrigue and pressure from the Ottomans and Hungary.

He assumed the throne in 1442, while his father was away at the Ottoman court. Mircea was deposed by an invasion led by John Hunyadi, yet he retained a strong army of loyalists. In 1444, he took part in the Battle of Varna and then led the defeated forces of his allies across the Danube. Following another military defeat in 1447, Mircea was captured by members of the Saxon elite of Târgoviște. He was reportedly blinded with a red-hot poker, and then buried alive.

== Early life ==
Mircea was the eldest son of Vlad Dracul, the future voivode (or prince) of Wallachia. According to the Burgundian crusader, Walerand of Wavrin, Mircea was about 15 years old in 1443, suggesting that Mircea had been born around 1428. The first document to mention Mircea (and his younger brother, Vlad Dracula) was issued on 20 January 1437. In that charter, their father (who was already the ruler of Wallachia) referred to Mircea and Vlad as his "firstborn sons". According to a widely accepted scholarly theory, a princess (also known by the title cneajnă) from Moldavia and daughter of Alexander I of Moldavia was Mircea's mother.

== Reign ==
The Ottoman Sultan, Murad II, summoned Vlad Dracul to Edirne to do homage to him in March 1442. Before leaving Wallachia, Vlad Dracul appointed Mircea to rule Wallachia during his absence. The sultan accused Vlad Dracul of treachery and ordered his imprisonment. He also sent a force of 12,000 to invade Wallachia.

In 1436, Mircea II's father Vlad Dracul succeeded in regaining the throne of Wallachia following the death of his half-brother Alexandru I Aldea. Mircea II ruled in his father's absence beginning in 1442 when his father was away at the Ottoman court. His father's allied stance with the Ottoman Empire made him an enemy of John Hunyadi. In 1443, Hunyadi launched an attack on Wallachia, defeating both the Ottoman forces and those loyal to Vlad Dracul, forcing the latter to negotiate with the Ottoman court for support, with Mircea II fleeing and going into hiding. However, Mircea II had a strong following and retained a strong army during this period. Hunyadi placed Basarab II on the throne, but with the support of the Ottomans, Vlad Dracul would regain the throne shortly thereafter. Mircea II supported his father but did not support his stance of siding with the Ottomans. Vlad Dracul signed a treaty with the Ottomans, which required him to pay the usual annual tribute, as well as allowing two of his sons, Vlad Țepeș and Radu the Handsome, to be held captive.

In October 1444, Vlad Dracul arrived near Nicopolis and tried to dissuade Vladislav III, king of Poland and Hungary, from continuing the Crusade of Varna. Polish historian Callimachus tells that the leaders of the crusade did not listen, so Vlad II went back to Wallachia, but not before he had left Mircea II in command of an auxiliary unit of 4,000 Wallachian cavalrymen. The unit participated in the Battle of Varna on 10 November 1444 and after the defeat, Mircea led the remainder of his unit and the Christian forces across the Danube. An able military commander, he successfully recaptured the fortress of Giurgiu in 1445. However, in yet another treaty with the Ottomans, his father allowed the Ottomans to regain control of the fortress to retain their support for his rule and protect his two captive sons. In 1447, Hunyadi launched yet another attack against Wallachia, once more defeating the armies supporting Vlad Dracul and Mircea II, forcing Vlad Dracul to flee. Mircea II, however, captured by members of the Saxon elite who were part of the ruling council in Târgoviște, and was blinded with a red-hot poker, then buried alive. His father was captured and killed shortly thereafter.

Following their deaths, his brother Vlad Țepeș was placed on the throne by the Ottomans but was soon forced out. Vlad Țepeș would regain the throne in 1456, and would also carry out vengeance against the Saxon elite, whom he held responsible for his father and brother's deaths. Vlad Țepeș would also fight successfully against the Ottomans for a number of years. Vlad's political skill, capable administration, and tactical ability made him a dangerous opponent to his enemies, which in turn would paint him as a ruthless, tyrannical leader.

== Popular culture ==
- In Karen Chance's Cassandra Palmer series and Dorina Basarab series, Mircea Basarab features as the love interest of the former and father of the latter. He is also the North American Vampire Senate's chief negotiator. (Novels)
- In the comic strip Alley Oop, Mircea Țepeș, a direct descendant of Mircea, appears in a series of strips published during 1981.
- In David Weber's novel Out of the Dark, there is a Romanian soldier named Mircea Basarab, who eventually reveals himself to be Vlad Țepeș, who chose to take his brother's name after renouncing his vampiric nature.

== Sources ==
- Florescu, Radu R.; McNally, Raymond T. (1989). Dracula, Prince of Many Faces: His Life and his Times. Back Bay Books. ISBN 978-0-316-28656-5.
- Jefferson, John (2012). The Holy Wars of King Wladislas and Sultan Murad: The Ottoman-Christian Conflict from 1438-1444. Brill. ISBN 978-90-04-21904-5.
- Mureșanu, Camil (2001). John Hunyadi: Defender of Christendom. The Center for Romanian Studies. ISBN 973-9432-18-2.
- Treptow, Kurt W. (2000). Vlad III Dracula: The Life and Times of the Historical Dracula. The Center of Romanian Studies. ISBN 973-98392-2-3.

Mircea II of Wallachia House of Drăculești Born: 1428 Died: 1447
Regnal titles
Preceded by Vlad II Dracul	Voivode of Wallachia; 1442	Succeeded by Basarab II
