= Vlad the Impaler =

15th-century ruler of Wallachia

Vlad III
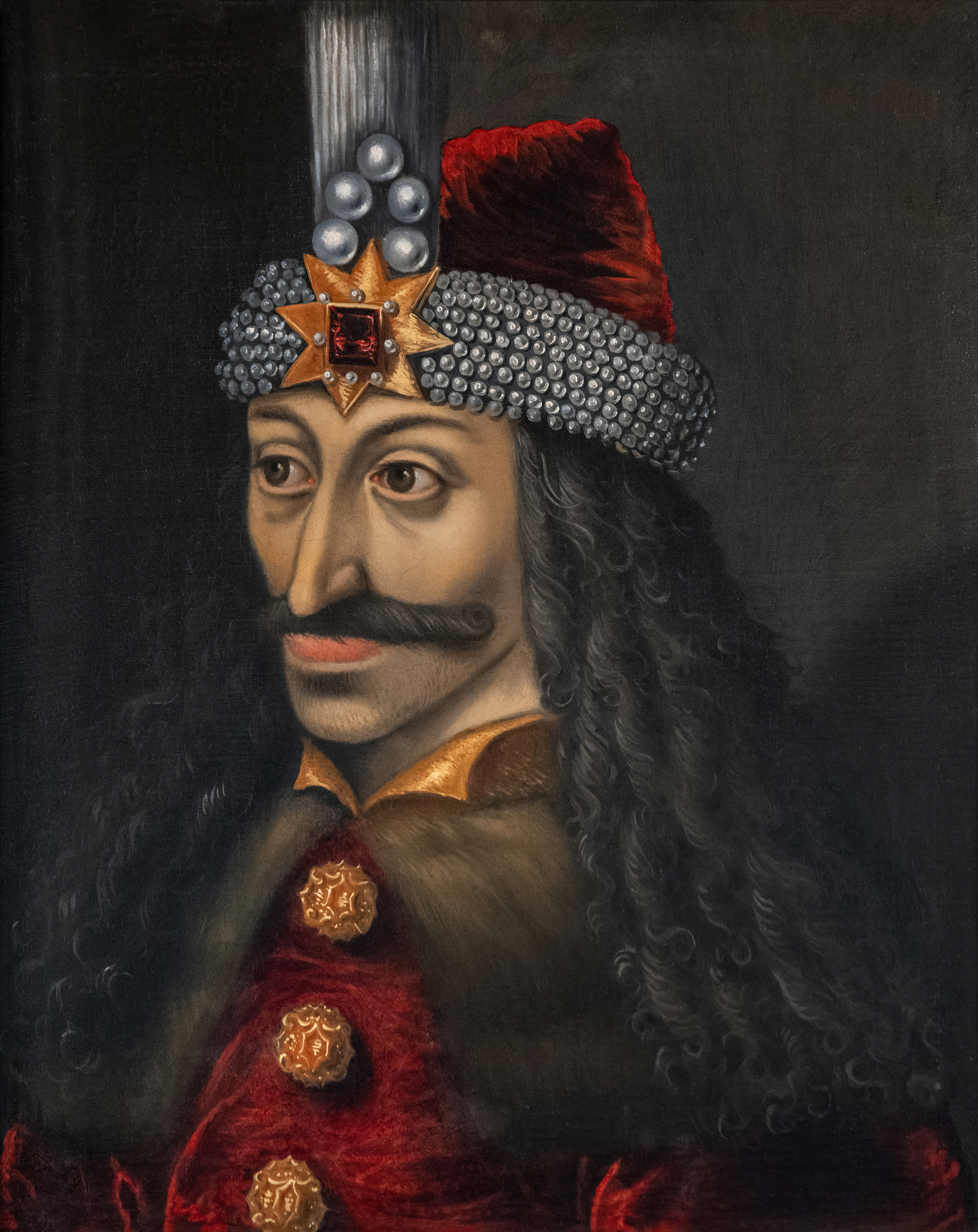
- Ambras Castle portrait of Vlad III (c. 1560), reputedly a copy of an original made during his lifetime

Voivode of Wallachia
- 1st reign: October – November 1448
- Predecessor: Vladislav II
- Successor: Vladislav II
- 2nd reign: 20 August 1456 – July 1462
- Predecessor: Vladislav II
- Successor: Radu III
- 3rd reign: June 1475 – December 1476 or January 1477
- Predecessor: Basarab III
- Successor: Basarab III
- Born: between 1428 and 1431; Segesvár, Kingdom of Hungary (now Sighișoara, Romania)
- Died: December 1476 or January 1477 (aged 44–49) near Snagov, Principality of Wallachia
- Spouse: Unknown first wife; Justina Szilágyi
- Issue: Mihnea
- House: Drăculești; Basarab (original branch)
- Father: Vlad II of Wallachia
- Mother: Eupraxia of Moldavia (?)
- Religion: Roman Catholic (Note: Converted from Eastern Orthodoxy)

Vlad III (1428–31 – 1476/77), commonly known as Vlad the Impaler (Romanian: Vlad Țepeș [ˈvlad ˈtsepeʃ]) or Vlad Dracula (/ˈdrækjʊlə, -jə-/ DRAK-yuu-lə, -yə-; Romanian: Vlad Drăculea [ˈdrəkule̯a]), was Voivode of Wallachia during three separate reigns (1448, 1456–1462, and 1475-1476/77). He was born in the House of Drăculești, as the son of Vlad II Dracul. Vlad is chiefly remembered for his efforts to strengthen central authority, suppress the power of rival boyars, and resist the expansion of the Ottoman Empire. His 1462 campaign against Sultan Mehmed II, including the Night Attack at Târgoviște, became one of the most notable military episodes of his reign. He was killed in battle in 1476 or 1477 during his final attempt to retain the Wallachian throne.

He was the second son of Vlad Dracul, who became the ruler of Wallachia in 1436. Vlad and his younger brother, Radu, were held as hostages in the Ottoman Empire in 1442 to secure their father's loyalty. Vlad's eldest brother Mircea and their father were murdered after John Hunyadi, regent-governor of Hungary, invaded Wallachia in 1447. Hunyadi installed Vlad's second cousin, Vladislav II, as the new voivode. Hunyadi launched a military campaign against the Ottomans in the autumn of 1448, and Vladislav accompanied him. Vlad broke into Wallachia with Ottoman support in October, but Vladislav returned, and Vlad sought refuge in the Ottoman Empire before the end of the year. Vlad went to Moldavia in 1449 or 1450 and later to Hungary.

Relations between Hungary and Vladislav later deteriorated, and in 1456 Vlad invaded Wallachia with Hungarian support. After killing Vladislav, Vlad began a purge among the Wallachian boyars to strengthen his position. He came into conflict with the Transylvanian Saxons, who supported his opponents, Dan and Basarab Laiotă (who were Vladislav's brothers), and Vlad's illegitimate half-brother, Vlad Călugărul. Vlad plundered the Saxon villages, taking the captured people to Wallachia, where he had them impaled (which inspired his epithet). Peace was restored in 1460.

The Ottoman Sultan, Mehmed II, ordered Vlad to pay homage to him personally, but Vlad had the Sultan's two envoys captured and impaled. In January 1462, he attacked Ottoman territory, massacring tens of thousands of Turks and Muslim Bulgarians. Mehmed launched a campaign against Wallachia to replace Vlad with Vlad's younger brother, Radu. Vlad attempted to capture the sultan at Târgoviște during the night of 16–17 June 1462. The Sultan and the main Ottoman army left Wallachia, but many Wallachians deserted Vlad's forces and joined Radu. Vlad went to Transylvania to seek assistance from Matthias Corvinus, King of Hungary, in late 1462, but Corvinus had him imprisoned.

Vlad was held in captivity in Visegrád from 1463 to 1475. During this period, anecdotes about his cruelty started to spread in Germany and Italy. He was released at the request of Stephen III of Moldavia in the summer of 1475. Vlad was reputedly forced to convert to Roman Catholicism (from Eastern Orthodoxy) as part of the agreement for his release. He fought in Corvinus's army against the Ottomans in Bosnia in early 1476. Hungarian and Moldavian troops helped him to force Basarab Laiotă (who had dethroned Vlad's brother, Radu) to flee from Wallachia in November. Basarab returned with Ottoman support before the end of the year. Vlad was killed in battle near Snagov before 10 January 1477.

Books describing Vlad's cruel acts were among the first bestsellers in the German-speaking territories. In Russia, popular stories suggested that Vlad was able to strengthen his central government only by applying brutal punishments, and many 19th-century Romanian historians adopted a similar view. It is suggested that Vlad's patronymic inspired the name of Bram Stoker's literary vampire, Count Dracula. Despite this, Vlad is not directly mentioned in Stoker's notes for the novel. Implicit references are mentioned, however, such as to the 1460 Wallachian "Voivode (Dracula)" who "crossed the Danube and attacked Turkish troops."

== Name ==
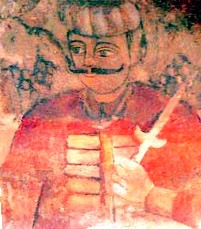
Vlad's father, Vlad Dracul

The name Dracula, which is now primarily known as the name of a vampire, was for centuries known as the sobriquet of Vlad III. Diplomatic reports and popular stories referred to him as Dracula, Dracuglia, or Drakula already in the 15th century. He himself signed his two letters as "Dragulya" or "Drakulya" in the late 1470s. His name had its origin in the sobriquet of his father, Vlad Dracul ("Vlad the Dragon" in medieval Romanian), who received it after he became a member of the Order of the Dragon. Dracula is the Slavonic genitive form of Dracul, meaning "[the son] of Dracul (of the Dragon)". In modern Romanian, dracul means "the devil", which contributed to Vlad's reputation.

Vlad III is known as Vlad Țepeș (or Vlad the Impaler) in Romanian historiography. This sobriquet is connected to the impalement that was his favorite method of execution. The Ottoman writer Tursun Beg referred to him as Kazıklı Voyvoda (Impaler Lord) around 1500. Mircea the Shepherd, Voivode of Wallachia, used this sobriquet when referring to Vlad III in a letter of grant on 1 April 1551.

== Early life ==
Vlad was the second legitimate son of Vlad II Dracul, who was himself an illegitimate son of Mircea I of Wallachia. Vlad II had won the moniker "Dracul" for his membership in the Order of the Dragon, a militant fraternity founded by Sigismund of Luxemburg, King of Hungary. The Order of the Dragon was dedicated to halting the Ottoman advance into Europe. Since he was old enough to be a candidate for the throne of Wallachia in 1448, Vlad III was probably born between 1428 and 1431. Vlad was most probably born after his father settled in Transylvania in 1429. Historian Radu Florescu writes that Vlad was born in the Transylvanian Saxon town of Segesvár, Kingdom of Hungary (now Sighișoara, Romania), where his father lived in a three-story stone house from 1431 to 1435. Modern historians identify Vlad's mother either as a daughter or kinswoman of Alexander I of Moldavia or as his father's unknown first wife.

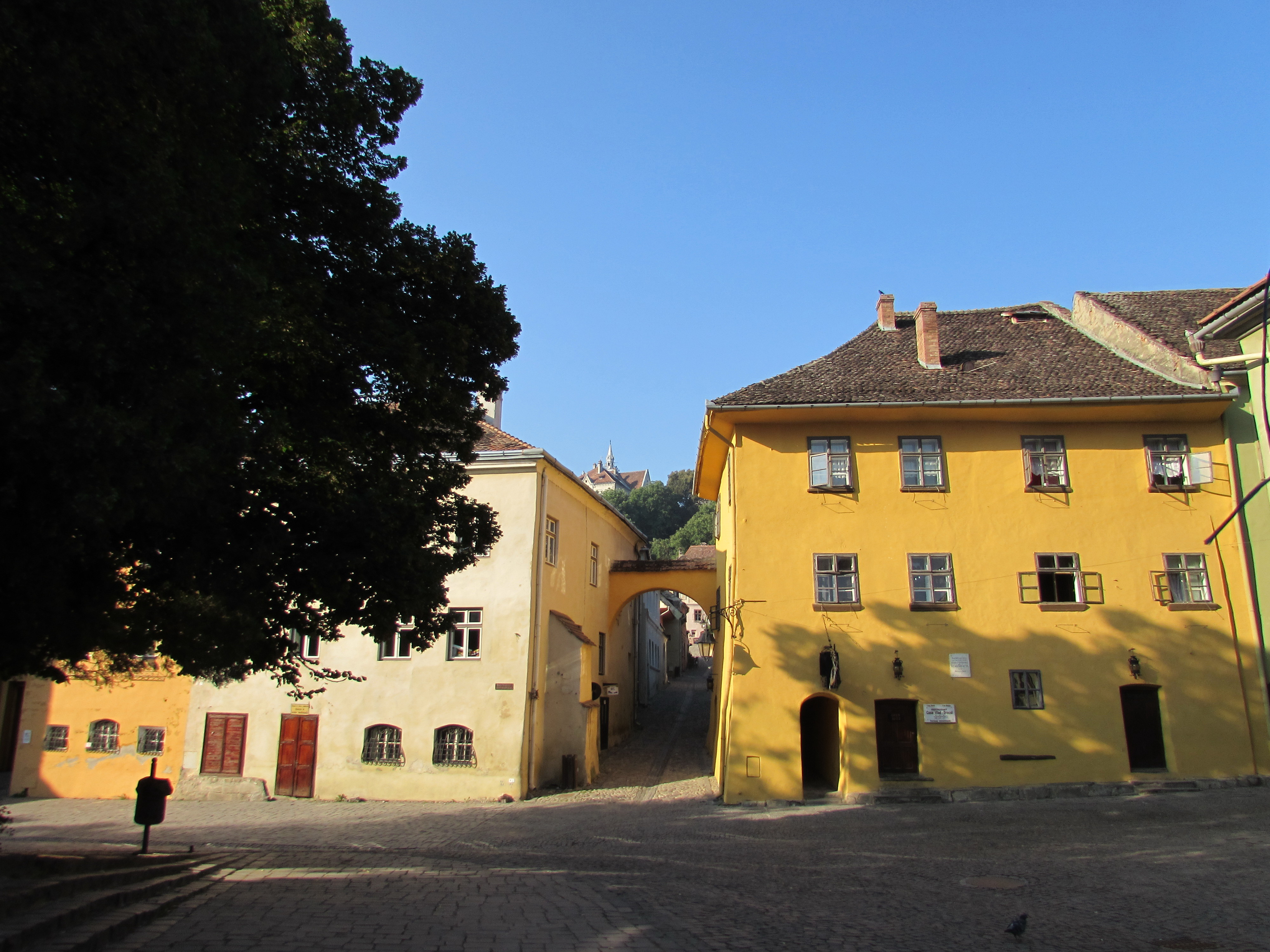
The house in the main square of Sighișoara where Vlad's father lived from 1431 to 1435

Vlad II Dracul seized Wallachia after the death of his half-brother Alexander I Aldea in 1436. One of his charters (which was issued on 20 January 1437) preserves the first reference to Vlad III and his elder brother, Mircea, mentioning them as their father's "firstborn sons". They were mentioned in four further documents between 1437 and 1439. The last of the four charters also refers to their younger brother, Radu.

After a meeting with John Hunyadi, Voivode of Transylvania, Vlad II Dracul did not support an Ottoman invasion of Transylvania in March 1442. The Ottoman Sultan, Murad II, ordered him to come to Gallipoli to demonstrate his loyalty. Vlad and Radu accompanied their father to the Ottoman Empire, where they were all imprisoned. Vlad Dracul was released before the end of the year, but Vlad and Radu remained hostages to secure his loyalty. They were held imprisoned in the fortress of Eğrigöz, according to contemporaneous Ottoman chronicles. Their lives were especially in danger after their father supported Vladislaus, King of Poland and Hungary, against the Ottoman Empire during the Crusade of Varna in 1444. Vlad II Dracul was convinced that his two sons would be "butchered for the sake of Christian peace", but neither Vlad nor Radu was murdered or mutilated after their father's rebellion.

Vlad Dracul again acknowledged the sultan's suzerainty and promised to pay an annual tribute to him in 1446 or 1447. John Hunyadi (who had by then become the regent-governor of Hungary in 1446), invaded Wallachia in November 1447. The Byzantine historian Michael Critobulus wrote that Vlad and Radu fled to the Ottoman Empire, which suggests that the sultan had allowed them to return to Wallachia after their father paid homage to him. Vlad Dracul and his eldest son, Mircea, were murdered. Hunyadi made Vladislav II (son of Vlad Dracul's cousin, Dan II) the ruler of Wallachia.

== Reigns ==
=== First rule ===
Lands ruled around 1390 by Vlad the Impaler's grandfather, Mircea I of Wallachia (the lands on the right side of the Danube had been lost to the Ottomans before Vlad's reign)

Upon the death of his father and elder brother, Vlad became a potential claimant to Wallachia. Vladislav II of Wallachia accompanied John Hunyadi, who launched a campaign against the Ottoman Empire in September 1448. Taking advantage of his opponent's absence, Vlad broke into Wallachia at the head of an Ottoman army in early October. He had to accept that the Ottomans had captured the fortress of Giurgiu on the Danube and strengthened it.

The Ottomans defeated Hunyadi's army in the Battle of Kosovo between 17 and 18 October. Hunyadi's deputy, Nicholas Vízaknai, urged Vlad to come to meet him in Transylvania, but Vlad refused him. Vladislav II returned to Wallachia at the head of the remnants of his army. Vlad was forced to flee to the Ottoman Empire by 7 December 1448.

We bring you the news that [Nicholas Vízaknai] writes to us and asks us to be so kind as to come to him until [John Hunyadi] ... returns from the war. We are unable to do this because an emissary from Nicopolis came to us ... and said with great certainty that [Murad II had defeated Hunyadi]. ... If we come to [Vízaknai] now, the [Ottomans] could come and kill both you and us. Therefore, we ask you to have patience until we see what has happened to [Hunyadi]. ... If he returns from the war, we will meet him, and we will make peace with him. But if you will be our enemies now, and if something happens, ... you will have to answer for it before God

— Vlad's letter to the councillors of Brașov

=== In exile ===
Vlad first settled in Edirne in the Ottoman Empire after his fall. Not long after, he moved to Moldavia, where Bogdan II (his father's brother-in-law and possibly his maternal uncle) had mounted the throne with John Hunyadi's support in the autumn of 1449. After Bogdan was murdered by Peter III Aaron in October 1451, Bogdan's son, Stephen, fled to Transylvania with Vlad to seek assistance from Hunyadi. However, Hunyadi concluded a three-year truce with the Ottoman Empire on 20 November 1451, acknowledging the Wallachian boyars' right to elect the successor of Vladislav II if he died.

Vlad allegedly wanted to settle in Brașov (which was a centre of the Wallachian boyars expelled by Vladislaus II), but Hunyadi forbade the burghers to give shelter to him on 6 February 1452. Vlad returned to Moldavia where Alexăndrel had dethroned Peter Aaron. The events of his life during the years that followed are unknown. He must have returned to Hungary before 3 July 1456 because, on that day, Hunyadi informed the townspeople of Brașov that he had tasked Vlad with the defence of the Transylvanian border.

=== Second rule ===
==== Consolidation ====
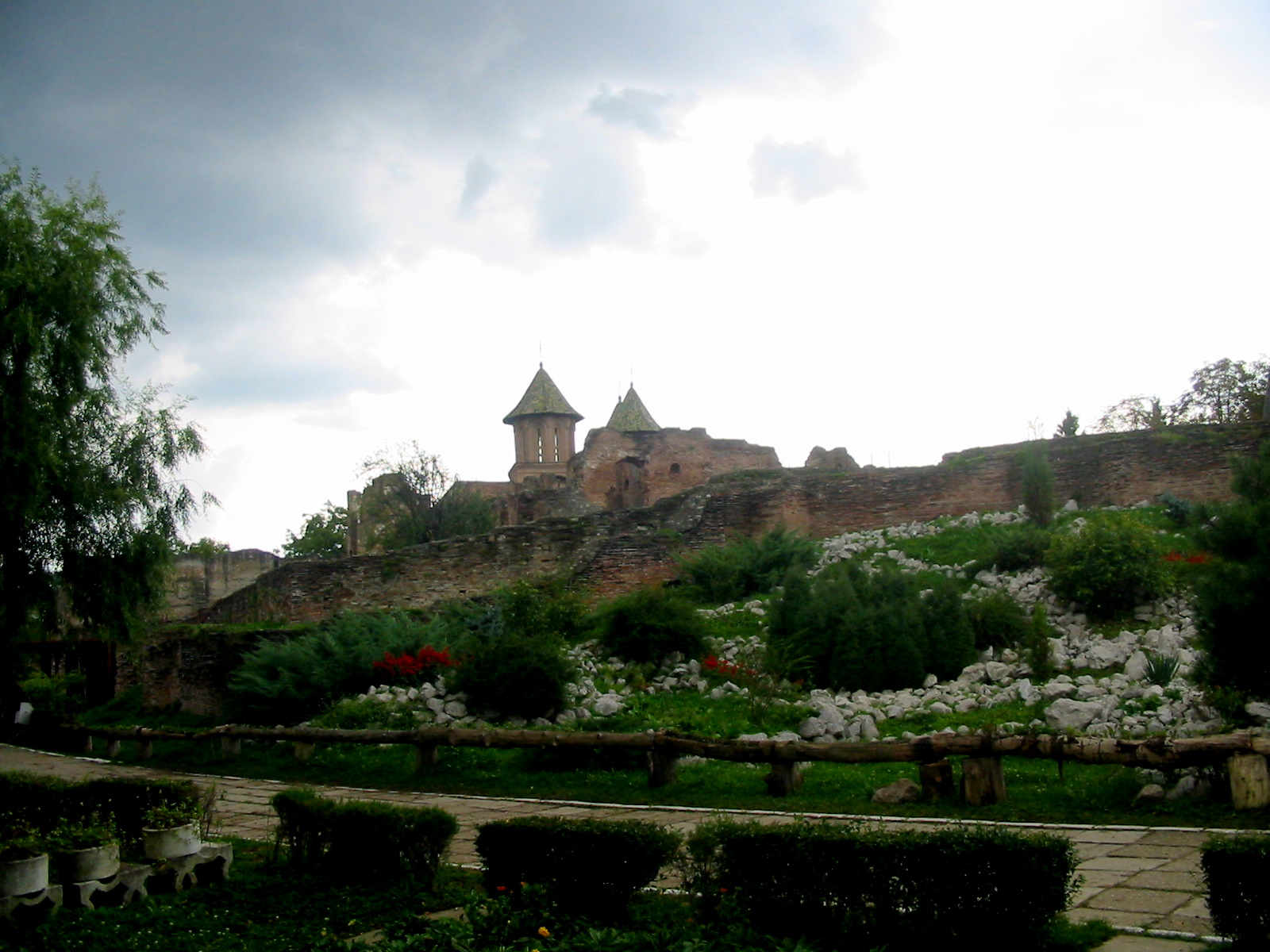
Ruins of the Târgoviște Princely Court in Târgoviște

The circumstances and the date of Vlad's return to Wallachia are uncertain. He invaded Wallachia with Hungarian support either in April, July or August 1456. Vladislav II died during the invasion. Vlad sent his first extant letter as voivode of Wallachia to the burghers of Brașov on 10 September. He promised to protect them in case of an Ottoman invasion of Transylvania, but he also sought their assistance if the Ottomans occupied Wallachia. In the same letter, he stated that "when a man or a prince is strong and powerful he can make peace as he wants to; but when he is weak, a stronger one will come and do what he wants to him", showing his authoritarian personality.

Multiple sources (including Laonikos Chalkokondyles's chronicle) recorded that hundreds or thousands of people were executed at Vlad's order at the beginning of his reign. He began a purge against the boyars who had participated in the murder of his father and elder brother or whom he suspected of plotting against him. Chalkokondyles stated that Vlad "quickly effected a great change and utterly revolutionized the affairs of Wallachia" through granting the "money, property, and other goods" of his victims to his retainers. The lists of the members of the princely council during Vlad's reign also show that only two of them (Voico Dobrița and Iova) were able to retain their positions between 1457 and 1461.

==== Conflict with the Saxons ====
Vlad sent the customary tribute to the sultan. After John Hunyadi died on 11 August 1456, his elder son, Ladislaus Hunyadi, became the captain-general of Hungary. He accused Vlad of having "no intention of remaining faithful" to the king of Hungary in a letter to the burghers of Brașov, also ordering them to support Vladislav II's brother, Dan III, against Vlad. The burghers of Sibiu supported another pretender, a "priest of the Romanians who calls himself a Prince's son". The latter (identified as Vlad's illegitimate brother, Vlad Călugărul) took possession of Amlaș, which had customarily been held by the rulers of Wallachia in Transylvania.

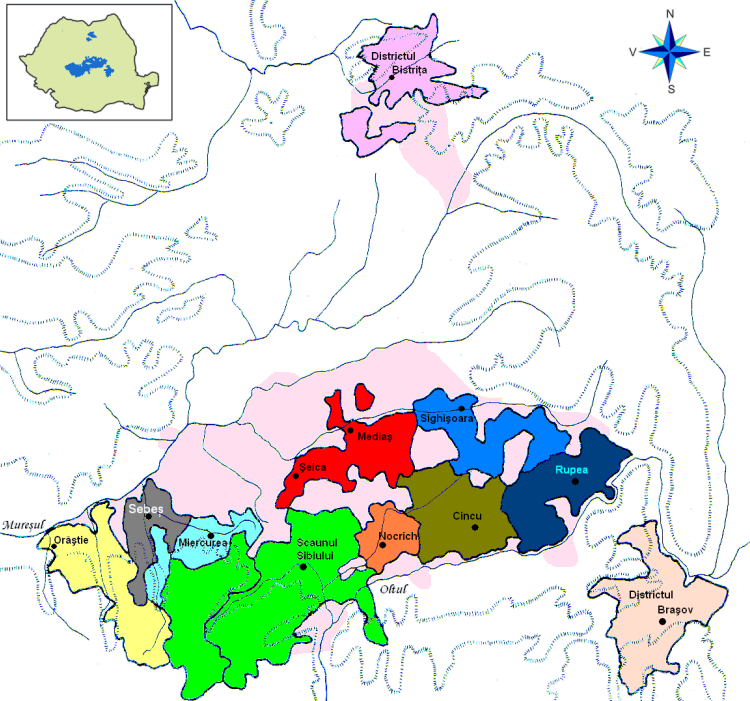
Medieval seats (or administrative units) of the Transylvanian Saxons

Ladislaus V of Hungary had Ladislaus Hunyadi executed on 16 March 1457. Hunyadi's mother, Elizabeth Szilágyi, and her brother, Michael Szilágyi, stirred up a rebellion against the king. Taking advantage of the civil war in Hungary, Vlad assisted Stephen, son of Bogdan II of Moldavia, in his move to seize Moldavia in June 1457. Vlad also broke into Transylvania and plundered the villages around Brașov and Sibiu. The earliest German stories about Vlad recounted that he had carried "men, women, children" from a Saxon village to Wallachia and had them impaled. Since the Transylvanian Saxons remained loyal to the king, Vlad's attack against them strengthened the position of the Szilágyis.

Vlad's representatives participated in the peace negotiations between Michael Szilágyi and the Saxons. According to their treaty, the burghers of Brașov agreed that they would expel Dan from their town. Vlad promised that the merchants of Sibiu could freely "buy and sell" goods in Wallachia in exchange for the "same treatment" of the Wallachian merchants in Transylvania. Vlad referred to Michael Szilágyi as "his Lord and elder brother" in a letter on 1 December 1457.

Ladislaus Hunyadi's younger brother, Matthias Corvinus, was elected king of Hungary on 24 January 1458. He ordered the burghers of Sibiu to keep the peace with Vlad on 3 March. Vlad styled himself "Lord and ruler over all of Wallachia, and the duchies of Amlaș and Făgăraș" on 20 September 1459, showing that he had taken possession of both of these traditional Transylvanian fiefs of the rulers of Wallachia. Michael Szilágyi allowed the boyar Michael (an official of Vladislav II of Wallachia) and other Wallachian boyars to settle in Transylvania in late March 1458. Before long, Vlad had the boyar Michael killed.

In May, Vlad asked the burghers of Brașov to send craftsmen to Wallachia; however, his relationship with the Saxons deteriorated before the end of the year. According to a scholarly theory, the conflict emerged after Vlad forbade the Saxons to enter Wallachia, forcing them to sell their goods to Wallachian merchants at compulsory border fairs. Vlad's protectionist tendencies or border fairs are not documented. Instead, in 1476, Vlad emphasized that he had always promoted free trade during his reign.

The Saxons confiscated the steel that a Wallachian merchant had bought in Brașov without repaying the price to him. In response, Vlad "ransacked and tortured" some Saxon merchants, according to a letter that Basarab Laiotă (a son of Dan II of Wallachia) wrote on 21 January 1459. Basarab had settled in Sighișoara and laid claim to Wallachia. However, Matthias Corvinus supported Dan III (who was again in Brașov) against Vlad. Dan III stated that Vlad had Saxon merchants and their children impaled or burnt alive in Wallachia.

You know that King Matthias has sent me, and when I came to Țara Bârsei the officials and councillors of Brașov and the old men of Țara Bârsei cried to us with broken hearts about the things which Dracula, our enemy, did; how he did not remain faithful to our Lord, the king, and had sided with the [Ottomans]. ... [H]e captured all the merchants of Brașov and Țara Bârsei who had gone in peace to Wallachia and took all their wealth, but he was not satisfied only with the wealth of these people, but he imprisoned them and impaled them, 41 in all. Nor were these people enough; he became even more evil and gathered 300 boys from Brașov and Țara Bârsei that he found in ... Wallachia. Of these, he impaled some and burned others.

— Basarab Laiotă's letter to the councillors of Brașov and Țara Bârsei

Dan III broke into Wallachia, but Vlad defeated and executed him before 22 April 1460. Vlad invaded southern Transylvania and destroyed the suburbs of Brașov, ordering the impalement of all men and women who had been captured. During the ensuing negotiations, Vlad demanded the expulsion or punishment of all Wallachian refugees from Brașov. Peace had been restored before 26 July 1460, when Vlad addressed the burghers of Brașov as his "brothers and friends". Vlad invaded the region around Amlaș and Făgăraș on 24 August to punish the local inhabitants who had supported Dan III.

==== Ottoman war ====
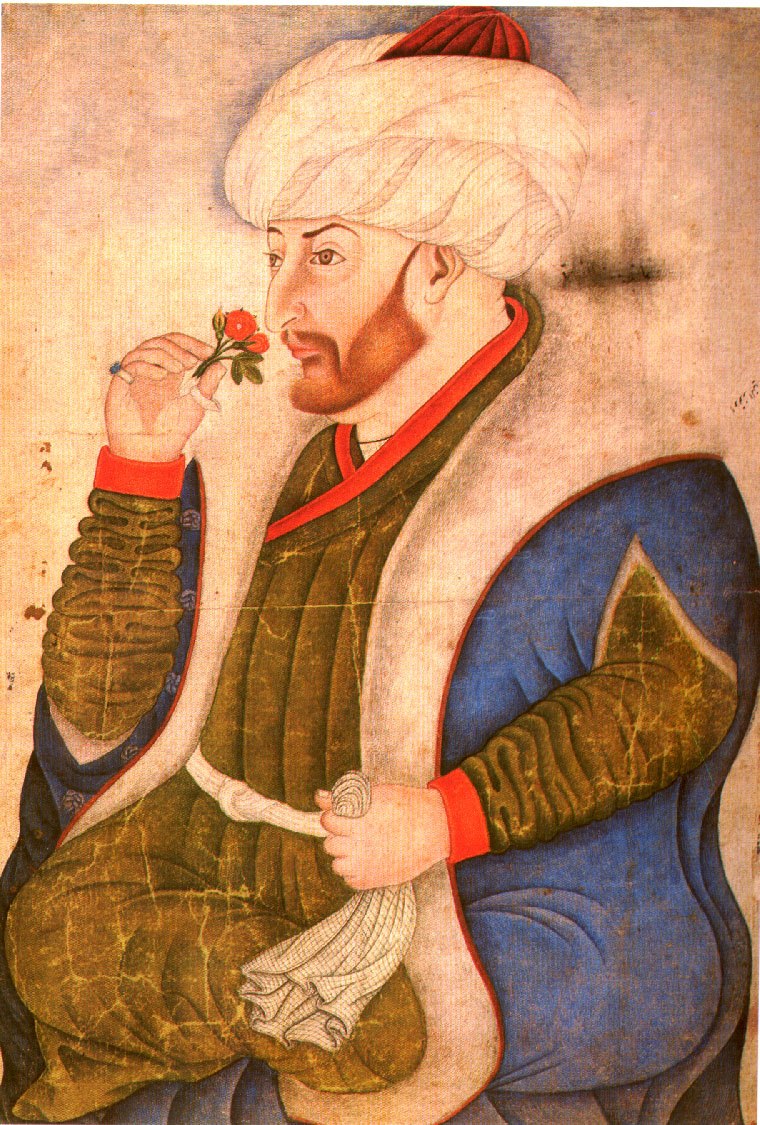
The Ottoman Sultan, Mehmed II, who invaded Wallachia during Vlad's reign

Vlad established a personal guard consisting of several hundred Hungarian mercenaries recruited from Transylvania. In recognition of their loyalty, he rewarded them with estates and properties confiscated from boyars who had displeased him or been accused of treason. Relying heavily on his trusted courtiers and boyars, Vlad successfully repelled an Ottoman incursion in the spring of 1458. The Ottoman expedition advanced into the region north of the Danube, led by Mahmud Pasha and reportedly involving 18,000 soldiers under the authority of Sultan Mehmed II. According to an anonymous contemporary account, Vlad confronted the Ottoman forces with an army of approximately 5,000 men, composed mainly of Wallachian courtiers and Hungarian mercenaries. He reportedly launched a surprise attack near the Danube, killing half of the Ottoman army.

Konstantin Mihailović (who served as a janissary in the sultan's army) recorded that Vlad refused to pay homage to the sultan in an unspecified year. The Renaissance historian Giovanni Maria degli Angiolelli likewise wrote that Vlad had failed to pay tribute to the sultan for three years. Both records suggest that Vlad ignored the suzerainty of the Ottoman Sultan, Mehmed II, already in 1459, but both works were written decades after the events. Tursun Beg (a secretary in the sultan's court) stated that Vlad only turned against the Ottoman Empire when the sultan "was away on the long expedition in Trebizon" in 1461. According to Tursun Beg, Vlad started new negotiations with Matthias Corvinus, but the sultan was soon informed by his spies. Mehmed sent his envoy, the Greek Thomas Katabolinos (also known as Yunus bey), to Wallachia, ordering Vlad to come to Constantinople. He also sent secret instructions to Hamza, bey of Nicopolis, to capture Vlad after he crossed the Danube. Vlad found out the sultan's "deceit and trickery", captured Hamza and Katabolinos, and had them executed.

After the execution of the Ottoman officials, Vlad gave orders in fluent Turkish to the commander of the fortress of Giurgiu to open the gates, enabling the Wallachian soldiers to break into the fortress and capture it. He invaded the Ottoman Empire, devastating the villages along the Danube. He informed Matthias Corvinus about the military action in a letter on 11 February 1462. He stated that more than "23,884 Turks and Bulgarians" had been killed at his order during the campaign. He sought military assistance from Corvinus, declaring that he had broken the peace with the sultan "for the honor" of the king and the Holy Crown of Hungary and "for the preservation of Christianity and the strengthening of the Catholic faith". The relationship between Moldavia and Wallachia had become tense by 1462, according to a letter of the Genoese governor of Kaffa.

Having learnt of Vlad's invasion, Mehmed II raised an army of more than 150,000 men that was said to be "second in size only to the one" that occupied Constantinople in 1453, according to Chalkokondyles. The size of the army suggests that the sultan wanted to occupy Wallachia, according to a number of historians (including Franz Babinger, Radu Florescu, and Nicolae Stoicescu). On the other hand, Mehmed had granted Wallachia to Vlad's brother, Radu, before the invasion of Wallachia, showing that the sultan's principal purpose was only the change of the ruler of Wallachia.

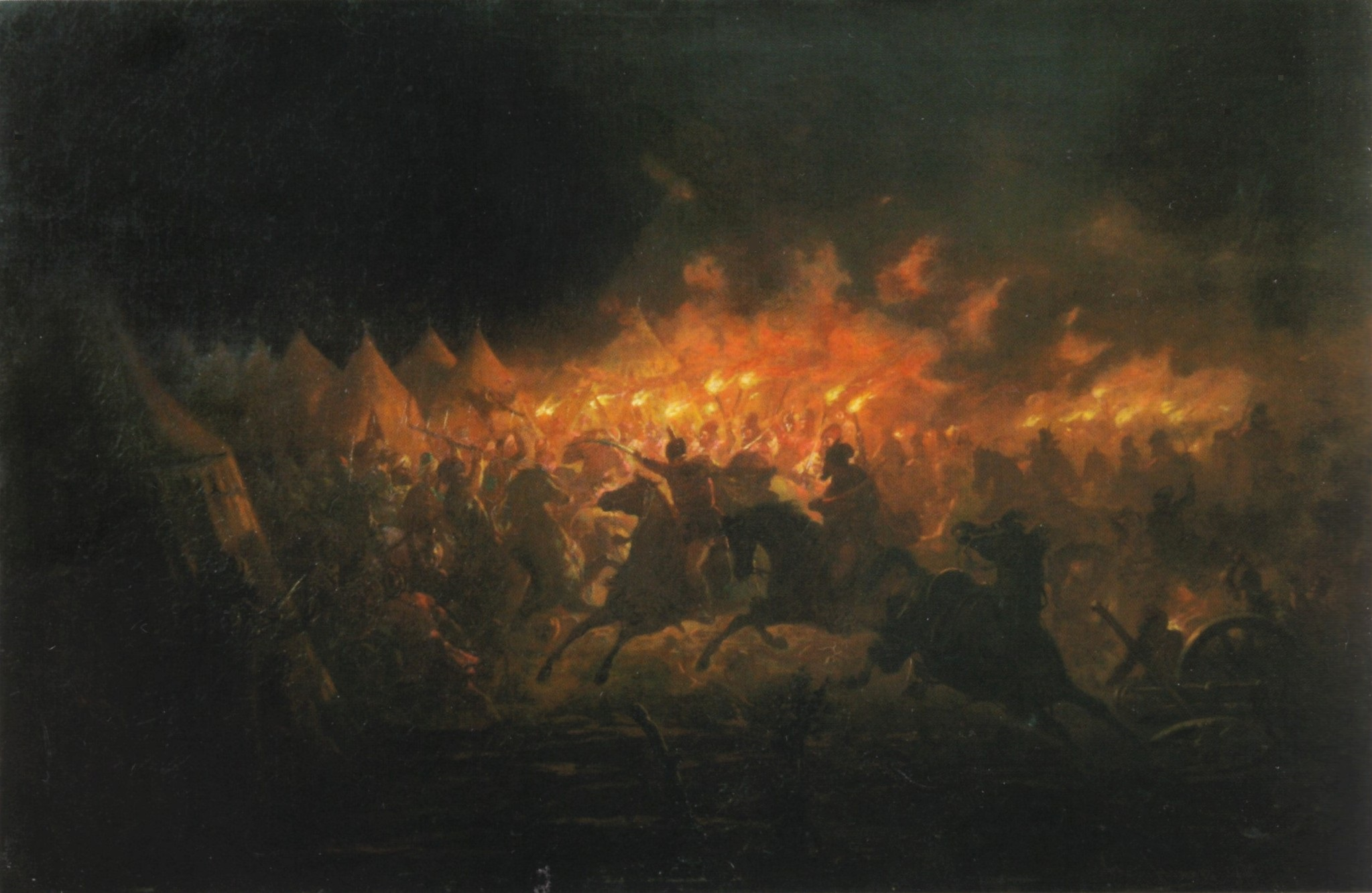
The Battle with Torches, a painting by Theodor Aman about Vlad's Night attack at Târgoviște

The Ottoman fleet landed at Brăila (which was the only Wallachian port on the Danube) in May. The main Ottoman army crossed the Danube under the command of the sultan at Nikopol, Bulgaria on 4 June 1462. Outnumbered by the enemy, Vlad adopted a scorched earth policy and retreated towards Târgoviște. During the night of 16–17 June, Vlad broke into the Ottoman camp in an attempt to capture or kill the sultan. The imprisonment or death of the sultan would have caused panic among the Ottomans, which could have enabled Vlad to defeat the Ottoman army. However, the Wallachians "missed the court of the sultan himself" and attacked the tents of the viziers Mahmud Pasha and Isaac. Having failed to attack the sultan's camp, Vlad and his retainers left the Ottoman camp at dawn. Mehmed entered Târgoviște at the end of June. The town had been deserted, but the Ottomans were horrified to discover a "forest of the impaled" (thousands of stakes with the carcasses of executed people), according to Chalkokondyles.

The sultan's army entered into the area of the impalements, which was seventeen stades long and seven stades wide. There were large stakes there on which, as it was said, about twenty thousand men, women, and children had been spitted, quite a sight for the Turks and the sultan himself. The sultan was seized with amazement and said that it was not possible to deprive of his country a man who had done such great deeds, who had such a diabolical understanding of how to govern his realm and its people. And he said that a man who had done such things was worth much. The rest of the Turks were dumbfounded when they saw the multitude of men on the stakes. There were infants too affixed to their mothers on the stakes, and birds had made their nests in their entrails.

— Laonikos Chalkokondyles: The Histories

Tursun Beg recorded that the Ottomans suffered from the summer heat and thirst during the campaign. The sultan decided to retreat from Wallachia and marched towards Brăila. Stephen III of Moldavia hurried to Chilia (now Kiliya in Ukraine) to seize the important fortress where a Hungarian garrison had been stationed. Vlad also departed for Chilia, leaving behind a force of 6,000 men to hinder the march of the sultan's army, but the Ottomans defeated the Wallachians. Stephen of Moldavia was wounded during the siege of Chilia and returned to Moldavia before Vlad arrived at the fortress.

The main Ottoman army left Wallachia, but Vlad's brother Radu and his Ottoman troops stayed behind in the Bărăgan Plain. Radu sent messengers to the Wallachians, reminding them that the sultan could again invade their country. Although Vlad defeated Radu and his Ottoman allies in two battles during the following months, more and more Wallachians deserted to Radu. Vlad withdrew to the Carpathian Mountains, hoping that Matthias Corvinus would help him regain his throne. However, Albert of Istenmező, the deputy of the Count of the Székelys, had recommended in mid-August that the Saxons recognize Radu. Radu also made an offer to the burghers of Brașov to confirm their commercial privileges and pay them a compensation of 15,000 ducats.

=== Imprisonment in Hungary ===
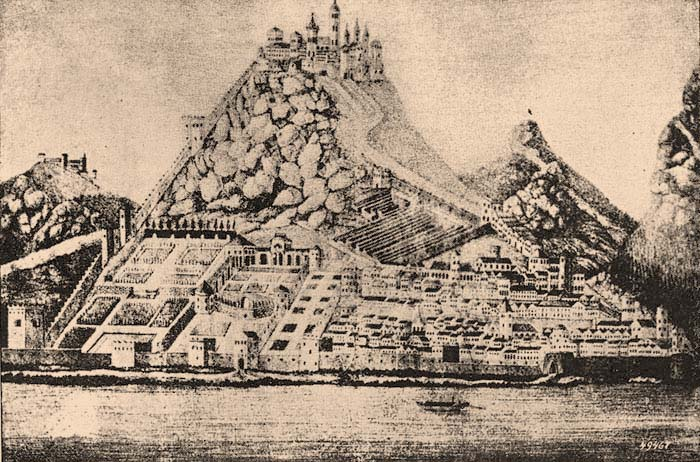
Renaissance palaces of Matthias Corvinus's summer residence at Visegrád (engraving from the 1480s)

Matthias Corvinus came to Transylvania in November 1462. The negotiations between Corvinus and Vlad lasted for weeks, but Corvinus did not want to wage war against the Ottoman Empire. At the king's order, his Czech mercenary commander, John Jiskra of Brandýs, captured Vlad near Rucăr in Wallachia.

To provide an explanation for Vlad's imprisonment to Pope Pius II and the Venetians (who had sent money to finance a campaign against the Ottoman Empire), Corvinus presented three letters, allegedly written by Vlad on 7 November 1462, to Mehmed II, Mahmud Pasha, and Stephen of Moldavia. According to the letters, Vlad offered to join his forces with the sultan's army against Hungary if the sultan restored him to his throne. Most historians agree that the documents were forged to give grounds for Vlad's imprisonment. Corvinus's court historian, Antonio Bonfini, admitted that the reason for Vlad's imprisonment was never clarified. Florescu writes, "[T]he style of writing, the rhetoric of meek submission (hardly compatible with what we know of Dracula's character), clumsy wording, and poor Latin" are all evidence that the letters could not be written on Vlad's order. He associates the author of the forgery with a Saxon priest of Brașov.

Vlad was first imprisoned "in the city of Belgrade" (now Alba Iulia in Romania), according to Chalkokondyles. Before long, he was taken to Visegrád, where he was held for 14 years. No documents referring to Vlad between 1462 and 1475 have been preserved. In mid-1475, Stephen III of Moldavia sent his envoys to Matthias Corvinus, asking him to send Vlad to Wallachia against Basarab Laiotă, who had submitted himself to the Ottomans. Stephen wanted to secure Wallachia for a ruler who had been an enemy of the Ottoman Empire, because "the Wallachians [were] like the Turks" to the Moldavians, according to his letter. According to the Slavic stories about Vlad, he was only released after he converted to Catholicism.

=== Third rule and death ===
Matthias Corvinus recognized Vlad as the lawful prince of Wallachia, but he did not provide him with military assistance to regain his principality. Vlad settled in a house in Pest. When a group of soldiers broke into the house while pursuing a thief who had tried to hide there, Vlad had their commander executed because they had not asked his permission before entering his home, according to the Slavic stories about his life. Vlad moved to Transylvania in June 1475. He wanted to settle in Sibiu and sent his envoy to the town in early June to arrange a house for him. Mehmed II acknowledged Basarab Laiotă as the lawful ruler of Wallachia. Corvinus ordered the burghers of Sibiu to give 200 golden florins to Vlad from the royal revenues on 21 September, but Vlad left Transylvania for Buda in October.

Vlad bought a house in Pécs that became known as Drakula háza ("Dracula's house" in Hungarian). In January 1476 John Pongrác of Dengeleg, Voivode of Transylvania urged the people of Brașov to send to Vlad all those of his supporters who had settled in the town, because Corvinus and Basarab Laiotă had concluded a treaty. The relationship between the Transylvanian Saxons and Basarab remained tense, and the Saxons gave shelter to Basarab's opponents during the following months. Corvinus dispatched Vlad and the Serbian Vuk Grgurević to fight against the Ottomans in Bosnia in early 1476. They captured Srebrenica and other fortresses in February and March 1476. In the Bosnian campaign, Vlad once again resorted to his terror tactics, mass impaling captured Turkish soldiers and massacring civilians in conquered settlements. His troops mostly destroyed Srebrenica, Kušlat, and Zvornik.

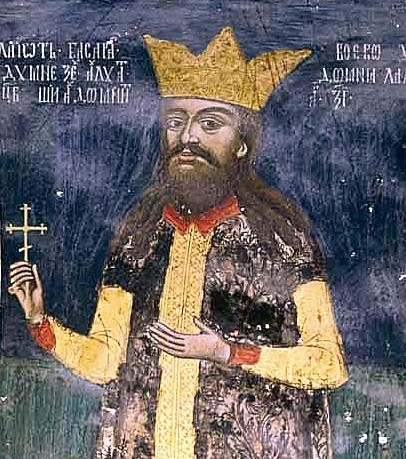
Basarab Laiotă, who tried to defend his throne against Vlad with Ottoman support

Mehmed II invaded Moldavia and defeated Stephen III in the Battle of Valea Albă on 26 July 1476. Stephen Báthory and Vlad entered Moldavia, forcing the sultan to lift the siege of the fortress at Târgu Neamț in late August, according to a letter of Matthias Corvinus. The contemporaneous Jakob Unrest added that Vuk Grgurević and a member of the noble Jakšić family also participated in the struggle against the Ottomans in Moldavia.

Matthias Corvinus ordered the Transylvanian Saxons to support Báthory's planned invasion of Wallachia on 6 September 1476, also informing them that Stephen of Moldavia would also invade Wallachia. Vlad stayed in Brașov and confirmed the commercial privileges of the local burghers in Wallachia on 7 October 1476. Báthory's forces captured Târgoviște on 8 November. Stephen of Moldavia and Vlad ceremoniously confirmed their alliance, and they occupied Bucharest, forcing Basarab Laiotă to seek refuge in the Ottoman Empire on 16 November. Vlad informed the merchants of Brașov about his victory, urging them to come to Wallachia. He was crowned before 26 November.

Basarab Laiotă returned to Wallachia with Ottoman support, and Vlad died fighting against them in late December 1476 or early January 1477. In a letter written on 10 January 1477, Stephen III of Moldavia related that Vlad's Moldavian retinue had also been massacred. According to the "most reliable sources", Vlad's army of about 2,000 was cornered and destroyed by a Turkish-Basarab force of 4,000 near Snagov. The exact circumstances of his death are unclear. The Austrian chronicler Jacob Unrest stated that a disguised Turkish assassin murdered Vlad in his camp. In contrast, Russian statesman Fyodor Kuritsyn –who interviewed Vlad's family after his demise– reported that the voivode was mistaken for a Turk by his own troops during battle, causing them to attack and kill him. Historians Florescu and Raymond T. McNally commented this account by noting that Vlad had often disguised himself as a Turkish soldier as part of military ruses. According to Leonardo Botta, the Milanese ambassador to Buda, the Ottomans cut Vlad's corpse into pieces. Bonfini wrote that Vlad's head was sent to Mehmed II; it was eventually placed on a high stake in Constantinople. His severed head allegedly was displayed and buried in Voivode Street (today Bankalar Caddesi) in Karaköy. It is rumoured that Voyvoda Han, located on Bankalar Caddesi No. 19, was the last stop of Vlad Tepeş's skull. Local peasant traditions maintain that what was left of Vlad's corpse was later discovered in the marshes of Snagov by monks from the nearby monastery.

The place of his burial is unknown. According to popular tradition (which was first recorded in the late 19th century), Vlad was buried in the Monastery of Snagov. However, the excavations carried out by Dinu V. Rosetti in 1933 found no tomb below the supposed "unmarked tombstone" of Vlad in the monastery church. Rosetti reported: "Under the tombstone attributed to Vlad, there was no tomb. Only many bones and jaws of horses." Historian Constantin Rezachevici said Vlad was most probably buried in the first church of the Comana Monastery, which had been established by Vlad and was near the battlefield where he was killed.

== Ancestry and descendants ==
Vlad had two wives, according to modern specialists. His first wife may have been an illegitimate daughter of John Hunyadi, according to historian Alexandru Simon. They had one son, Mihnea the Evil, that was born in 1462. In 1462, Vlad and his wife were forewarned of an attack by Turkish forces on Poenari Castle led by Vlad's half-brother Radu cel Frumos. Not wanting to be captured and believing there was no escape, his wife threw herself from the tower and into the river below, Riul Daomnei – the Princess's River, named for the tragedy.

Vlad's second wife was Justina Szilágyi, who was a cousin of Matthias Corvinus, King of Hungary. She was the widow of Vencel Pongrác of Szentmiklós when "Ladislaus Dragwlya" married her, most probably in 1475. She survived Vlad Dracul, and married thirdly Pál Suki, then János Erdélyi. They had two children, the first being an unnamed son that was killed before 1486. Vlad's third son, Vlad Drakwlya, unsuccessfully laid claim to Wallachia around 1495. He was the forefather of the noble Dracula family.

While Vlad has three documented children, it is believed that he had another illegitimate son. During the 1462 siege, Vlad, his attendants, and an illegitimate son managed to escape into the mountains. While fleeing, his son fell off the saddle he was tied to and was lost in the woods. Vlad did not return to search for his son, leaving him behind. The boy, who was not yet in his teens, was found the following morning by a shepherd who took him in and raised him as his own. Vlad would return to the area 14 years later where he was reunited with his son and granted the shepherd riches in return for caring for the son. Not much else is known about the boy, however it is believed he stayed in the area and eventually became governor of the castle.

Vlad's confirmed children

Vlad III; 1428/31 – 1476/77; "Vlad the Impaler" "Vlad Dracula"	First wife of Vlad; ?–1462	Justina Szilágyi; <1455 – 1497
Mihnea cel Rău; c. 1460–1510; "Mihnea the Evil"	Doamna Voica of Izvorani	Unnamed son; ? – c. 1482	Vlad Dracul; "Vlad Drakwlya"
Milos	Mircea III Dracul; ?–1534	Maria Despina of Serbia	Ruxandra of Wallachia	Bogdan III; 1479–1517; "Bogdan III the One-Eyed" "Bogdan the Blind"
Alexandru II Mircea; 1529–1577	Catherine Salvaresso; ?–1590; 'Ecaterina Salvaresso"	Peter the Lame; 1534–1594	Maria	Miloș Vodă	Mircea
Mihnea II Turcitul; 1564–1601; "Mihnea the Turned-Turk"	Voica Bratcul	Ștefanița
Radu Mihnea; 1586–1626	Arghira Minetti
Alexandru Radu; 1611–1632; "Alexandru Coconul" "Alexandru Corvin"

=== Ancestry ===
Vlad the Impaler's Ancestry

Nicholas Alexander of Wallachia; 1300–1364	Lady Maria	Clara Dobokai
Prince Voislav; ?–1366	Princess Elizabeth of Wallachia; 1340–1369	Vladislav I of Wallachia; ? - 1377; "Vlaicu-Vodă"	Anna of Wallachia; Princess of Wallachia	Anna of Wallachia, Empress of Serbia; "Jelena"	Radu I of Wallachia; c. 1377 – c. 1383/1385	Calinichia; ? - c. 1439; "Kalinikia"	Doamna Ana
Maria Tolmay; ? – 1420/27; "Doamna Maria"	Doamna Ana	Mircea the Elder; c. 1355 – 1418	Dan I of Wallachia; 1354–1386
Michael I of Wallachia; ? - 1420	Arina of Wallachia	Ana of Wallachia	Radu II of Wallachia; ? – 1427; "Radu the Empty Head"	Alexander I Aldea; 1397–1436	Vlad II; c. 1395 – 1447; "Vlad Dracul"	Eupraxia of Moldavia (?)
Mircea II of Wallachia; 1428–1447	Vlad III; 1428/31 – 1476/77; "Vlad the Impaler" "Vlad Dracula"	Radu the Handsome; c. 1438 – 1475; "Radu the Fair"	Vlad Călugărul; <1425 – 1495; "Vlad the Monk"	Alexandria of Wallachia

== Legacy ==
=== Reputation for cruelty ===
==== First records ====
Stories about Vlad's brutal acts began circulating during his lifetime. After his arrest, courtiers of Matthias Corvinus promoted their spread. The papal legate, Niccolo Modrussiense, had already written about such stories to Pope Pius II in 1462. Two years later, the Pope included them in his Commentaries.

It was even rumored that Vlad once dipped his bread into the blood of his impaled victims. So far, this remains legendary, as the story has not been confirmed.

Meistersinger Michael Beheim wrote a lengthy poem about Vlad's deeds, allegedly based on his conversation with a Catholic monk who had managed to escape from Vlad's prison. The poem, called Von ainem wutrich der heis Trakle waida von der Walachei ("Story of a Despot Called Dracula, Voievod of Wallachia"), was performed at the court of Frederick III, Holy Roman Emperor, in Wiener Neustadt during the winter of 1463. According to one of Beheim's stories, Vlad had two monks impaled to assist them to go to heaven, also ordering the impalement of their donkey because it began braying after its masters' death. Beheim also accused Vlad of duplicity, stating that Vlad had promised support to both Matthias Corvinus and Mehmed II but did not keep the promise.

In 1475, Gabriele Rangoni, Bishop of Eger (and a former papal legate), understood that Vlad had been imprisoned because of his cruelty. Rangoni also recorded the rumour that while in prison Vlad caught rats to cut them up into pieces or stuck them on small pieces of wood, because he was unable to "forget his wickedness". Antonio Bonfini also recorded anecdotes about Vlad in his Historia Pannonica around 1495. Bonfini wanted to justify both the removal and the restoration of Vlad by Matthias. He described Vlad as "a man of unheard cruelty and justice". Bonfini's stories about Vlad were repeated in Sebastian Münster's Cosmography. Münster also recorded Vlad's "reputation for tyrannical justice".

Turkish messengers came to [Vlad] to pay respects, but refused to take off their turbans, according to their ancient custom, whereupon he strengthened their custom by nailing their turbans to their heads with three spikes, so that they could not take them off.

— Antonio Bonfini: Historia Pannonica

==== German stories ====
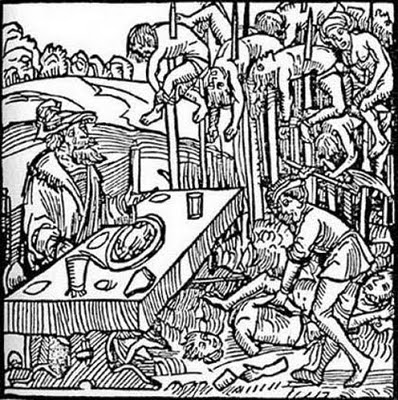
1499 German woodcut showing Dracule waide dining among the impaled corpses of his victims

Works containing the stories about Vlad's cruelty were published in Low German in the Holy Roman Empire before 1480. The stories were allegedly written in the early 1460s, because they describe Vlad's campaign across the Danube in early 1462; however, they do not refer to Mehmed II's invasion of Wallachia in June of the same year. They provide a detailed narration of the conflicts between Vlad and the Transylvanian Saxons, showing that they originated "in the literary minds of the Saxons".

The stories about Vlad's plundering raids in Transylvania were clearly based on an eyewitness account, because they contain accurate details (including the lists of the churches destroyed by Vlad and the dates of the raids). They describe Vlad as a "demented psychopath, a sadist, a gruesome murderer, a masochist", worse than Caligula and Nero. However, the stories emphasizing Vlad's cruelty are to be treated with caution because his brutal acts were very probably exaggerated (or even invented) by the Saxons.

The invention of movable type printing contributed to the popularity of the stories about Vlad, making them one of the first "bestsellers" in Europe. To enhance sales, they were published in books with woodcuts on their title pages that depicted horrific scenes. For instance, the editions published in Nuremberg in 1499 and in Strasbourg in 1500 depict Vlad dining at a table surrounded by dead or dying people on poles.

... [Vlad] had a big copper cauldron built and put a lid made of wood with holes in it on top. He put the people in the cauldron and put their heads in the holes and fastened them there; then he filled it with water and set a fire under it and let the people cry their eyes out until they were boiled to death. And then he invented frightening, terrible, unheard of tortures. He ordered that women be impaled together with their suckling babies on the same stake. The babies fought for their lives at their mother's breasts until they died. Then he had the women's breasts cut off and put the babies inside headfirst; thus he had them impaled together.

— About a mischievous tyrant called Dracula vodă (No. 12–13)

==== Russian stories ====
More than 20 Russian manuscripts, written between the 15th and 18th centuries, contain the text of the Skazanie o Drakule voievode ("The Tale about Voivode Dracula"). The text is commonly attributed to Fyodor Kuritsyn, an influential courtier under Ivan III of Russia, who led an embassy to Hungary from 1482 to 1485, although some Romanian scholars maintain that it had originally been recorded in a South Slavic language.

The 19 anecdotes in the Skazanie are longer than the German stories about Vlad. According to Raymond T. McNally, they combine fact and fiction. Almost half of the anecdotes emphasize Vlad's brutality, as do the German stories, even to the point of declaring that "his life was the image of his name", "which means 'devil' in our [language]", but they also underline that his cruelty enabled him to strengthen the central government in Wallachia. For instance, the Skazanie recounts that nobody dared to steal a golden cup left at a fountain, because Vlad "hated stealing so violently [...] that anybody who caused any evil or robbery [...] did not live long", thereby promoting public order, and the German story about Vlad's campaign against Ottoman territory underlined his cruel acts, while the Skazanie emphasized his successful diplomacy, calling him zlomudry ("evil-wise"). On the other hand, the Skazanie sharply criticized Vlad for his conversion to Catholicism, attributing his death to this apostasy. Some elements of the anecdotes were later incorporated into Russian stories about Ivan the Terrible.

==== Methods of torture and warfare ====
Vlad implemented various methods of torture as a form of spreading fear. Impalement was a favorite, often allowing the stake to be inserted slowly to allow for a slow death—sometimes over hours or even days. Various geometric patterns were used in his display of the victims, often placing the stakes in concentric circles on the outskirts of cities to ensure they could be seen by all. Victims were put on "high spears and low spears" according to their ranks. If someone were to remove a body from the stake, they would be hanged from a tree. Prior to the torture, Vlad would demand confessions of their sins. His punishment would depend on their last words and very occasionally a victim would escape the torture or death by offering him praise. He also based it on age, rank, and the sex of the victims.

Other forms included maiming, blinding, strangulation, roasting, burning, scalping, skinning, boiling alive, or allowing wild animals to attack the victim. According to some sources, Vlad compelled victims to eat the flesh of others.

Vlad was known for his particular cruelty towards women—particularly those who were unfaithful to husbands or were unchaste before marriage. He had a variety of sexual torture methods for women. These often included cutting out their sexual organs, slicing off breasts, and impaling them with hot iron stakes. In one tale, a mistress of Vlad was presumed to have committed infidelity, and she was impaled and her sexual organs were cut out. In another instance, an unfaithful woman was skinned alive and impaled on a stake, and her skin was hung from a pole in the midst of the town.

He also held a distaste for the poor. Vlad affirmed that killing the poor was an act of mercy to free them from their impoverished lives and into heaven. In one particular tale, Vlad saw beggars in a nearby town and felt distaste as they begged for money. He chose to invite them to a feast of many different foods and let them eat. While they ate, his army surrounded the beggars and began a circle of fire around them, allowing them to burn to death. This method was used frequently, including another instance where 400 boys from different lands came to explore the culture and were instead burned alive.

A particular method of warfare that Vlad employed was a form of germ warfare. He would encourage townspeople affected by diseases such as leprosy, tuberculosis, and the bubonic plague to intermingle with enemy soldiers. If the infected person complied and survived their disease they would be rewarded with riches. Criminals were also set free and encouraged to attack the Turkish people. After besieging cities, the armies would set fire to the villages and leave the people to take shelter in the mountains. In addition, his armies were commanded to poison water wells, burn crops, and kill all cattle that could not be taken. Dams were built to divert water resources from the Turkish people and create marshes that impeded them. Holes were dug into the ground and covered by branches to trap those on horses.

While it is certain that Vlad implemented many torture devices and executed thousands, scholars caution that tales could be exaggerated by time, those who feared him, and by his enemies that wished to damage his reputation.

==== Judgement by modern standards ====
In 1464, papal legate at Buda, Nicholas of Modruš, reported to Pope Pius II that Vlad had massacred 40,000 men and women of all ages and nationalities. Later in 1475, a contemporary papal nuncio, Gabriele Ragone, bishop of Erlau, reported that Vlad had personally authorized the execution of over 100,000 people.

The mass murders that Vlad carried out indiscriminately and brutally would most likely amount to acts of genocide and war crimes by current standards. Romanian defense minister Ioan Mircea Pașcu asserted that Vlad would have been condemned for crimes against humanity had he been put on trial at Nuremberg.

=== Possible hemolacria ===
According to research published in 2023 based on the analysis of samples collected from letters written by Vlad, he may have had a rare condition known as haemolacria, which causes a person's tears to be partially composed of blood.

=== As a regional hero ===
Due to his opposition to the Ottomans, Vlad was regarded by some in his region as a folk hero.

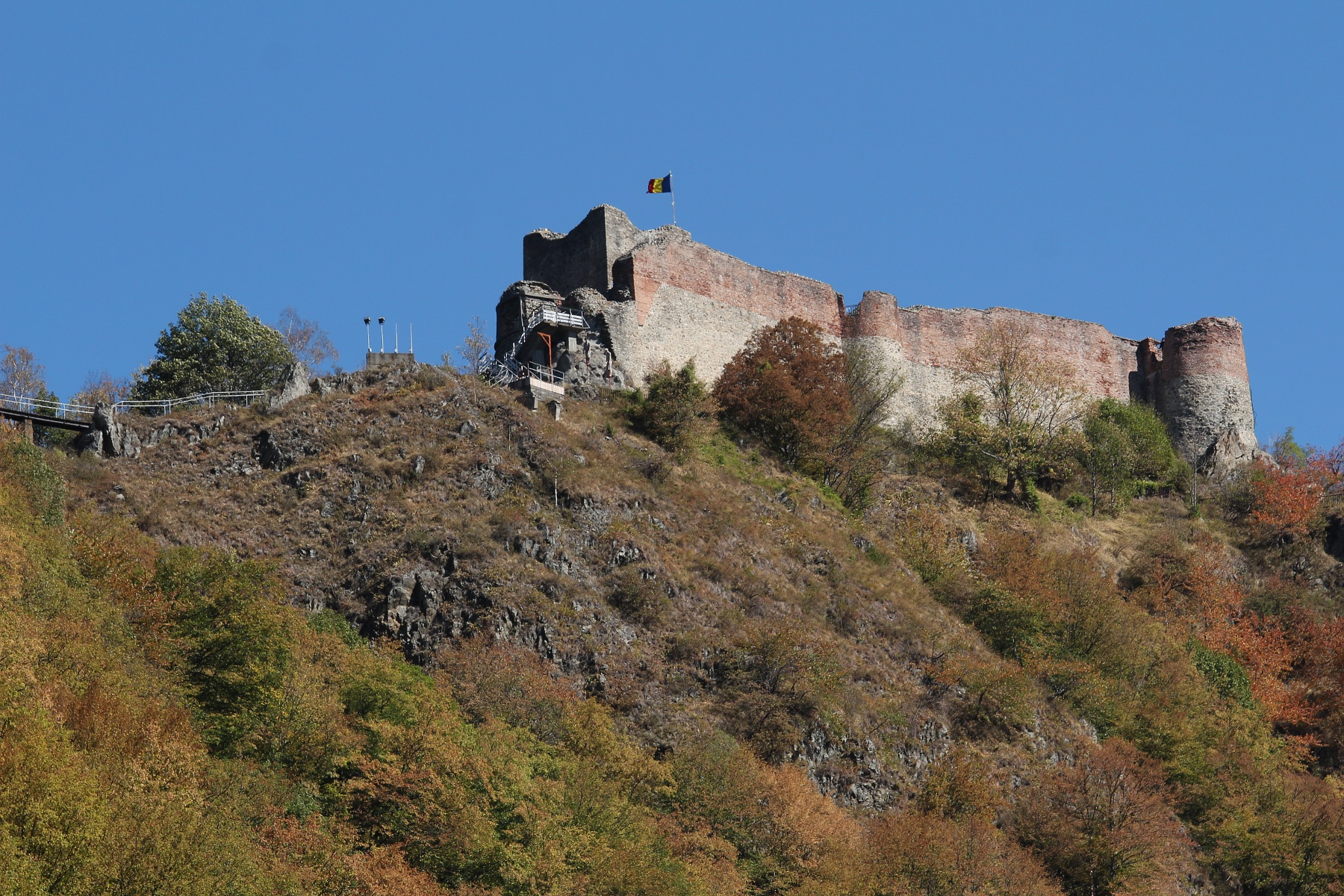
Ruins of Poenari Castle, the scene of a popular tale about Vlad

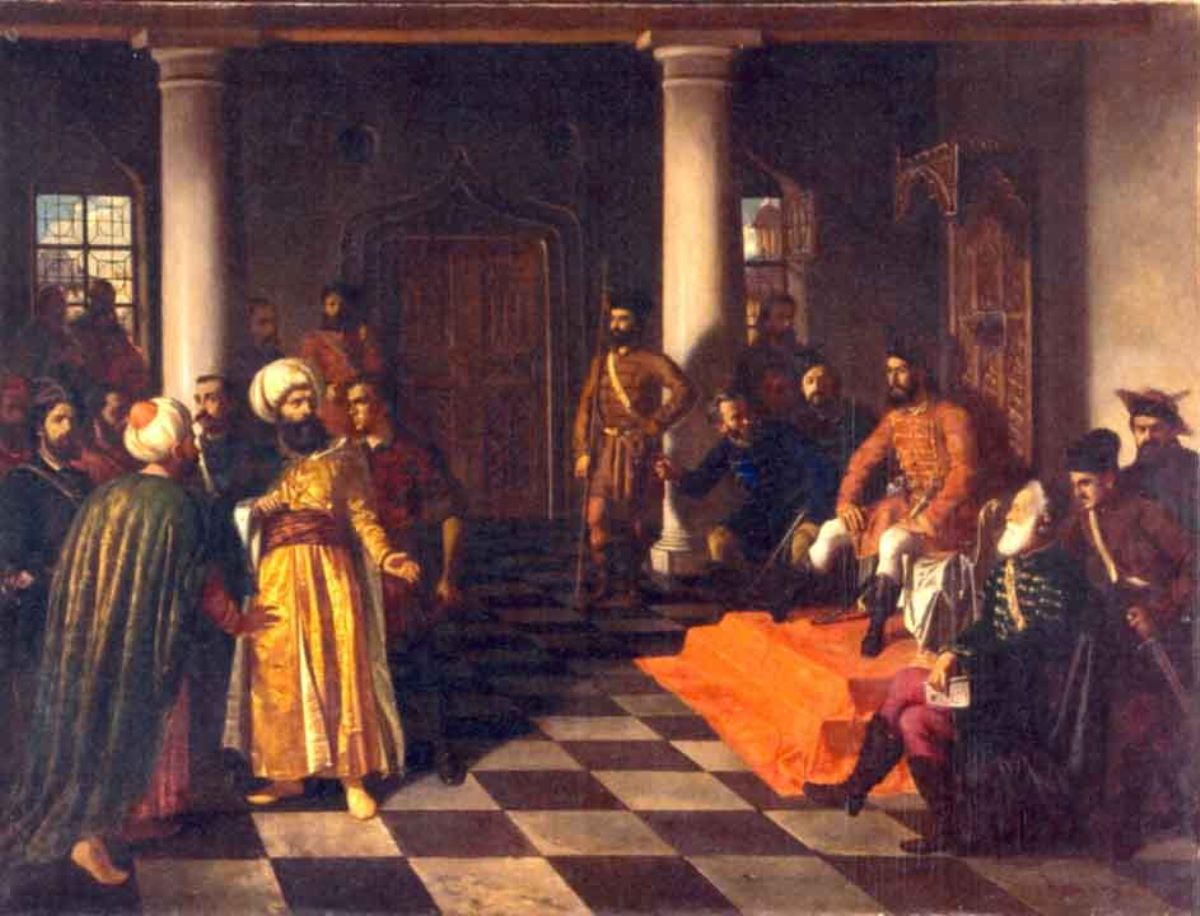
Vlad the Impaler and the Turkish envoys, painting by Theodor Aman

The Cantacuzino Chronicle was the first Romanian historical work to record a tale about Vlad the Impaler, narrating the impalement of the old boyars of Târgoviște for the murder of his brother, Dan. The chronicle added that Vlad forced the young boyars and their wives and children to build the Poenari Castle. The legend of the Poenari Castle was mentioned in 1747 by Neofit I, Metropolitan of Ungro–Wallachia, who complemented it with the story of Meșterul Manole, who allegedly walled in his bride to prevent the crumbling of the walls of the castle during the building project. In the early 20th century, Constantin Rădulescu-Codin, a teacher in Muscel County where the castle was situated, published a local legend about Vlad's letter of grant "written on rabbit skin" for the villagers who had helped him to escape from Poenari Castle to Transylvania during the Ottoman invasion of Wallachia. In other villages of the region, the donation is attributed to the legendary Radu Negru.

Rădulescu-Codin recorded further local legends, some of which are also known from the German and Slavic stories about Vlad, suggesting that the latter stories preserved oral tradition. For instance, the tales about the burning of the lazy, the poor, and the lame at Vlad's order and the execution of the woman who had made her husband too short a shirt can also be found among the German and Slavic anecdotes. The peasants telling the tales knew that Vlad's sobriquet was connected to the frequent impalements during his reign, but they said only such cruel acts could secure public order in Wallachia.

Most Romanian artists have regarded Vlad as a just ruler and a realistic tyrant who punished criminals and executed unpatriotic boyars to strengthen the central government. Ion Budai-Deleanu wrote the first Romanian epic poem focusing on him. Deleanu's Țiganiada (Gypsy Epic) (which was published only in 1875, almost a century after its composition) presented Vlad as a hero fighting against the boyars, Ottomans, strigoi (or vampires), and other evil spirits at the head of an army of gypsies and angels. The poet Dimitrie Bolintineanu emphasized Vlad's triumphs in his Battles of the Romanians in the middle of the 19th century. He regarded Vlad as a reformer whose acts of violence were necessary to prevent the despotism of the boyars. One of the greatest Romanian poets, Mihai Eminescu, dedicated a historic ballad, The Third Letter, to the valiant princes of Wallachia, including Vlad. He urges Vlad to return from the grave and to annihilate the enemies of the Romanian nation:

You must come, O dread Impaler, confound them to your care.
Split them in two partitions, here the fools, the rascals there;
Shove them into two enclosures from the broad daylight enisle 'em,
Then set fire to the prison and the lunatic asylum.

— Mihai Eminescu: The Third Letter

In the early 1860s, the painter Theodor Aman depicted the meeting of Vlad and the Ottoman envoys, showing the envoys' fear of the Wallachian ruler.

Since the middle of the 19th century, Romanian historians have treated Vlad as one of the greatest Romanian rulers, emphasizing his fight for the independence of the Romanian lands. Even Vlad's acts of cruelty were often represented as rational acts serving national interest. Alexandru Dimitrie Xenopol was one of the first historians to emphasize that Vlad could only stop the internal fights of the boyar parties through his acts of terror. Constantin C. Giurescu remarked, "The tortures and executions which [Vlad] ordered were not out of caprice, but always had a reason, and very often a reason of state". Ioan Bogdan was one of the few Romanian historians who did not accept this heroic image. In his work published in 1896, Vlad Țepeș and the German and Russian Narratives, he concluded that the Romanians should be ashamed of Vlad, instead of presenting him as "a model of courage and patriotism". According to an opinion poll conducted in 1999, 4.1% of the participants chose Vlad the Impaler as one of "the most important historical personalities who have influenced the destiny of the Romanians for the better". In a 2016 CSCI survey, Romanians were asked who they'd vote for in a hypothetical election with historical figures as candidates. Vlad the Impaler received the highest share of votes at 35%.

=== Vampire mythology ===
The stories about Vlad made him the best-known medieval ruler of the Romanian lands in Europe. However, Bram Stoker's Dracula, which was published in 1897, was the first book to make a connection between Dracula and vampirism. Stoker had his attention drawn to the blood-sucking vampires of Romanian folklore by Emily Gerard's article about Transylvanian superstitions (published in 1885). His limited knowledge about the medieval history of Wallachia came from William Wilkinson's book entitled Account of the Principalities of Wallachia and Moldavia with Political Observations Relative to Them, published in 1820.

Stoker "apparently did not know much about" Vlad the Impaler, "certainly not enough for us to say that Vlad was the inspiration for" Count Dracula, according to Elizabeth Miller. For instance, Stoker wrote that Dracula had been of Székely origin only because he knew about both Attila the Hun's destructive campaigns and the alleged Hunnic origin of the Székelys. Stoker's main source, Wilkinson, who accepted the reliability of the German stories, described Vlad as a wicked man. Actually, Stoker's working papers for his book contain no references to the historical figure, the name of the character being named in all drafts but the later ones 'Count Wampyr'. Consequently, Stoker borrowed the name and "scraps of miscellaneous information" about the history of Wallachia when writing his book about Count Dracula.

References to Vlad in Bram Stokers notes are indirect, never mentioning him by the name "Vlad" specifically. In the notes, he recounts the history of Vlad (referred to as the Wallachian "Voivode (Dracula)") ceasing tribute payments to "Sultan Mahomed II" around 1460. He describes Vlad's expedition across the Danube, attacking Turkish troops, and the subsequent Ottoman invasion which placed Vlad's brother as ruler of Wallachia while Vlad headed to Hungary.

References to Vlad in the novel are indirect as well. Vlad is implicitly mentioned in a segment where Dracula recounts the history of his race.

When was redeemed that great shame of my nation, the shame of Cassova, when the flags of the Wallach and the Magyar went down beneath the Crescent? Who was it but one of my own race who as Voivode crossed the Danube and beat the Turk on his own ground? This was a Dracula indeed! Woe was it that his own unworthy brother, when he had fallen, sold his people to the Turk and brought the shame of slavery on them! Was it not this Dracula, indeed, who inspired that other of his race who in a later age again and again brought his forces over the great river into Turkey-land; who, when he was beaten back, came again, and again, and again, though he had to come alone from the bloody field where his troops were being slaughtered, since he knew that he alone could ultimately triumph!

— Bram Stoker, Dracula, Page 28

Later in the novel, Dracula is said to have been " ...that Voivode Dracula who won his name against the Turk, over the great river on the very frontier of Turkey-land."

== Appearance and representations ==
Pope Pius II's legate, Niccolò Modrussa, painted the only extant description of Vlad, whom he had met in Buda. A copy of Vlad's portrait has been featured in the "monster portrait gallery" in the Ambras Castle at Innsbruck. The picture depicts "a strong, cruel, and somehow tortured man" with "large, deep-set, dark green, and penetrating eyes", according to Florescu. The colour of Vlad's hair cannot be determined because Modrussa mentions that Vlad was black-haired, while the portrait seems to show that he had fair hair. The picture depicts Vlad with a large lower lip.

Vlad's bad reputation in the German-speaking territories can be detected in a number of Renaissance paintings. He was portrayed among the witnesses of Saint Andrew's martyrdom in a 15th-century painting, displayed in the Belvedere in Vienna. A figure similar to Vlad is one of the witnesses of Christ in the Calvary in a chapel of the St. Stephen's Cathedral in Vienna.

[Vlad] was not very tall, but very stocky and strong, with a cold and terrible appearance, a strong and aquiline nose, swollen nostrils, a thin and reddish face in which the very long eyelashes framed large wide-open green eyes; the bushy black eyebrows made them appear threatening. His face and chin were shaven but for a moustache. The swollen temples increased the bulk of his head. A bull's neck connected [with] his head from which black curly locks hung on his wide-shouldered person.

— Niccolò Modrussa's description of Vlad the Impaler

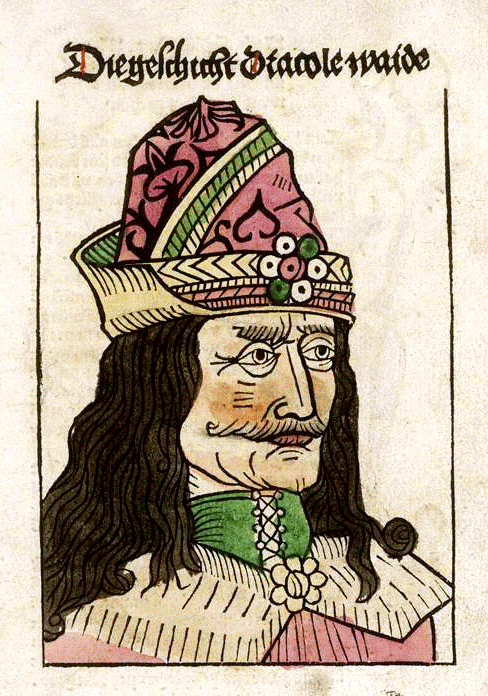
A woodcut depicting Vlad on the title page of a German pamphlet about him, published in Nuremberg in 1488

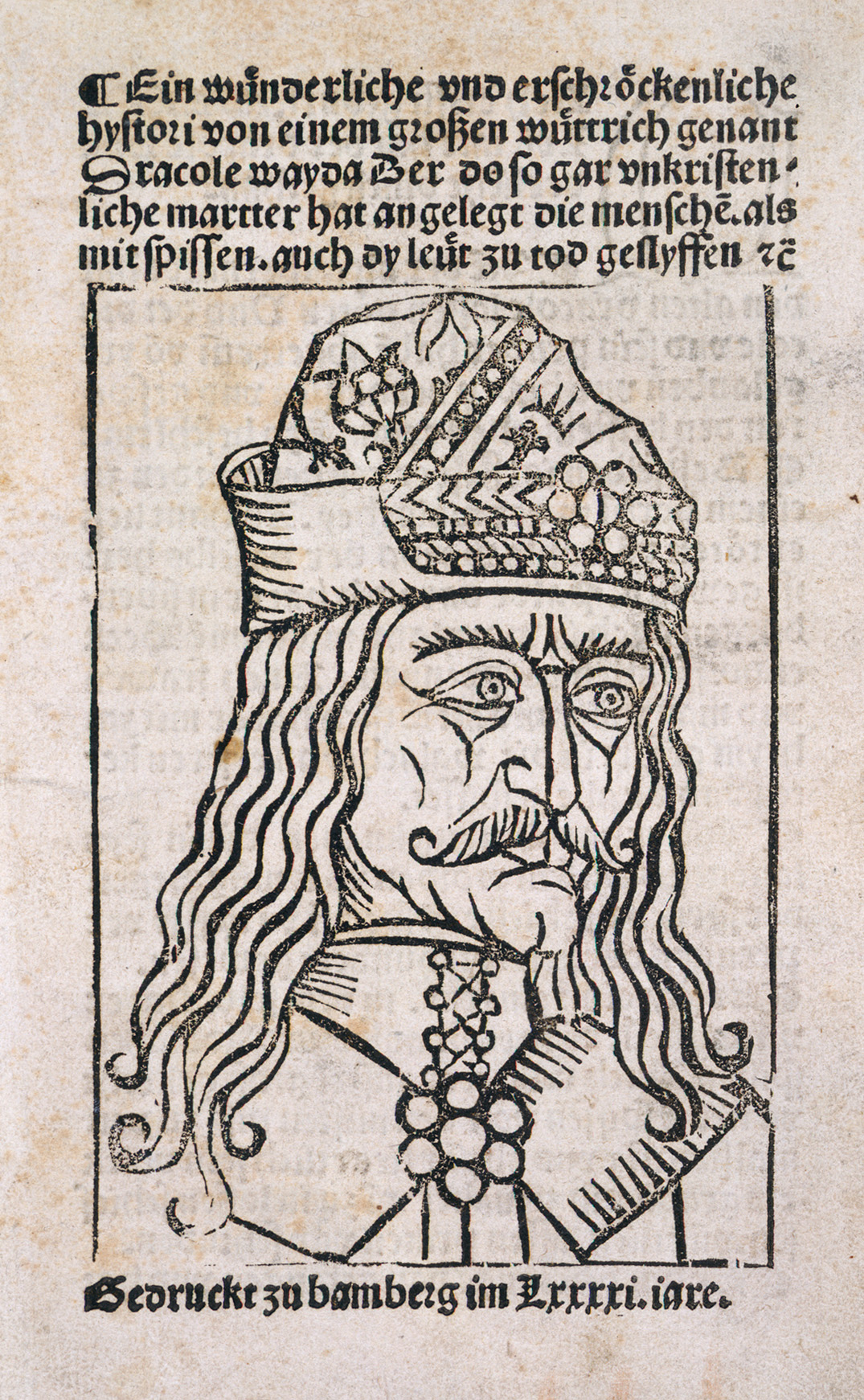
A 1491 engraving from Bamberg, Germany, depicting Dracole wayda

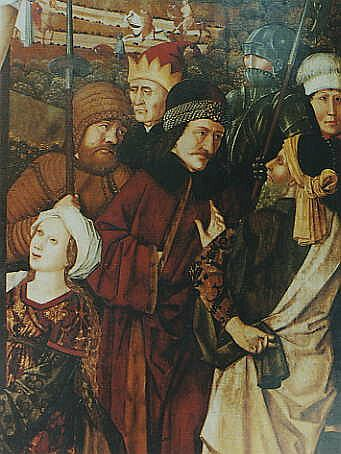
Likeness of Vlad found in Calvary of Christ painting, 1460, Maria am Gestade, Vienna

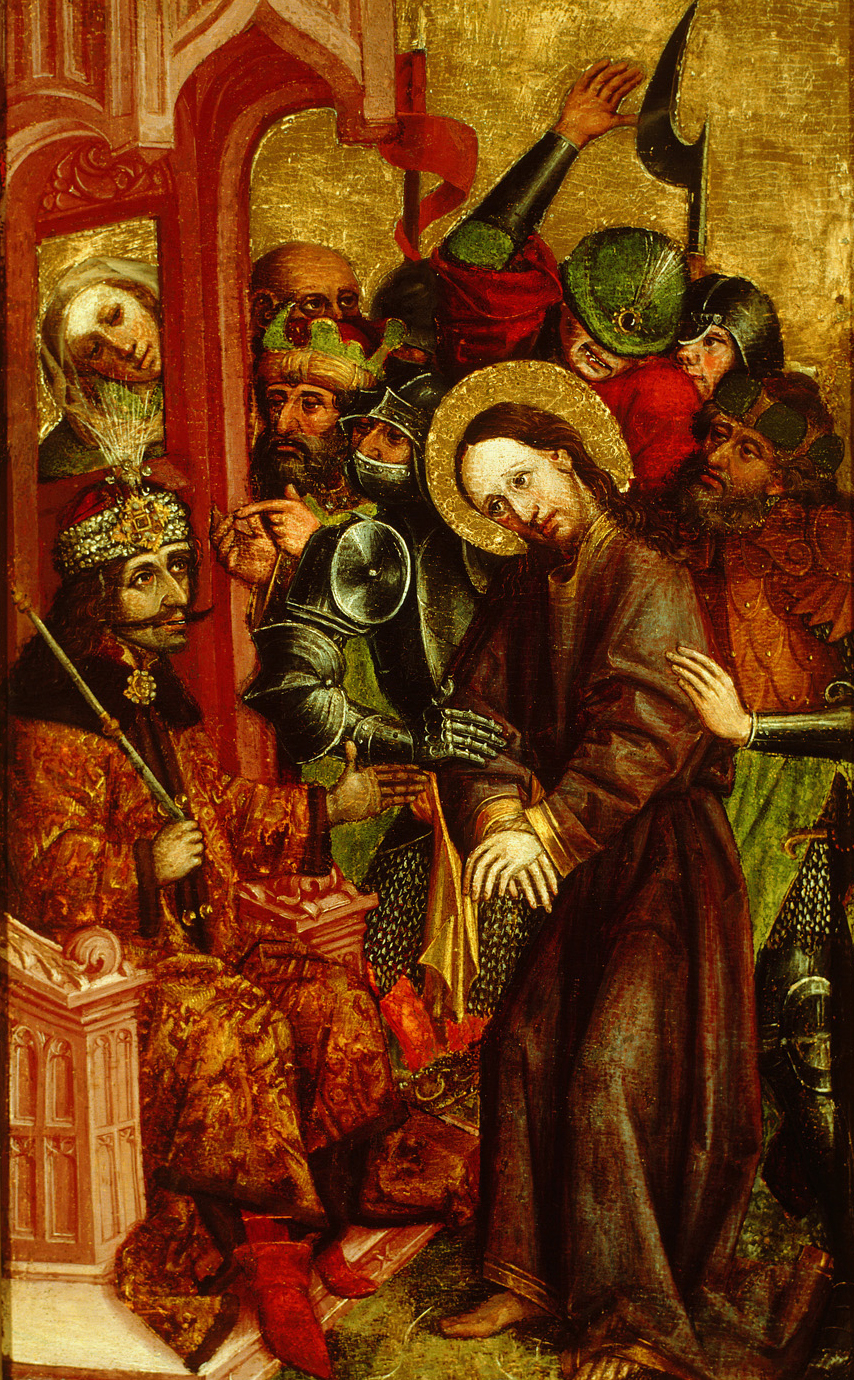
Pilate Judging Jesus Christ, 1463, National Gallery, Ljubljana

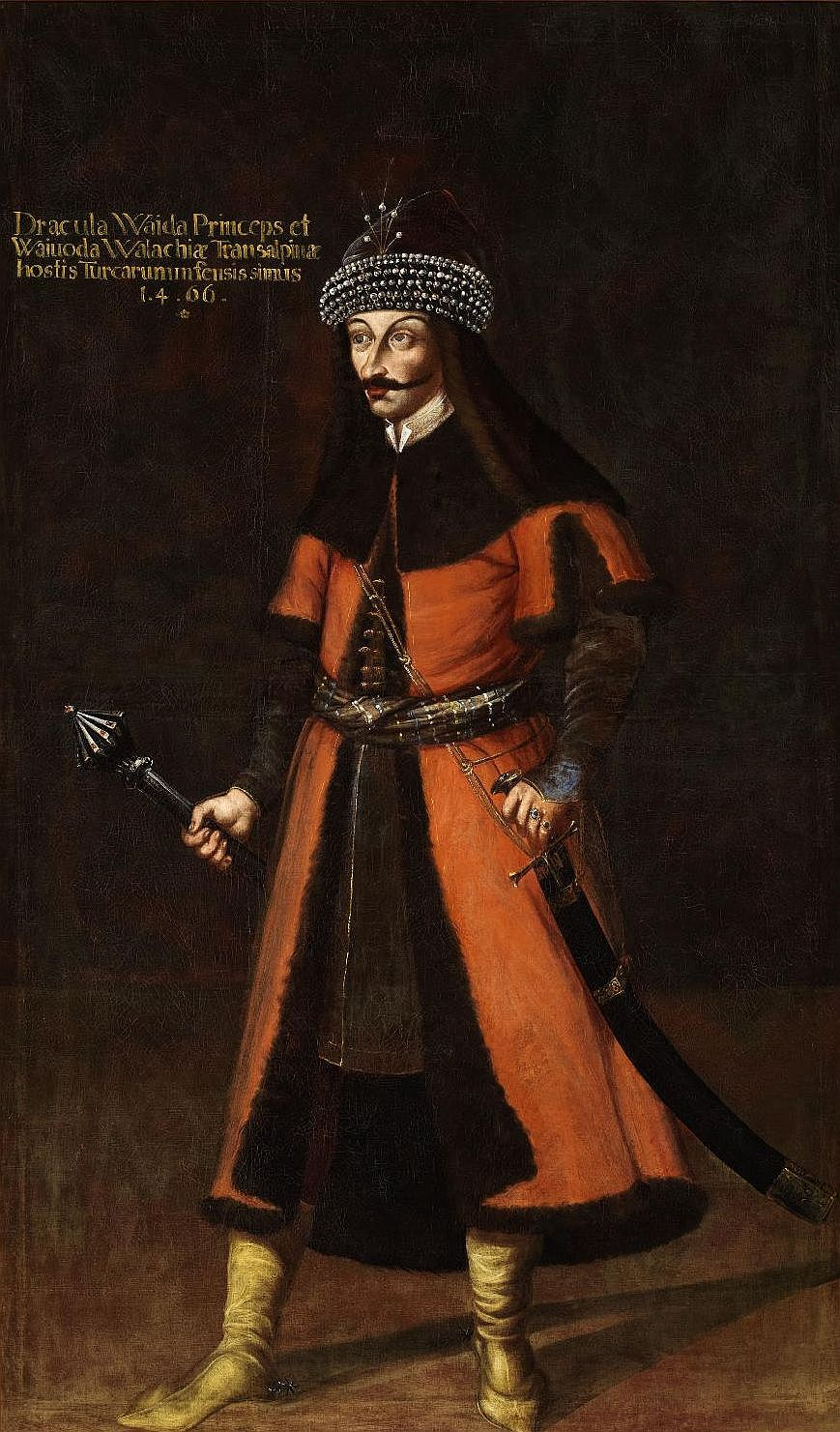
Full-size portrait of Vlad Țepeș in the "Gallery of Ancestors" of the House of Esterházy, 17th century, Forchtenstein Castle

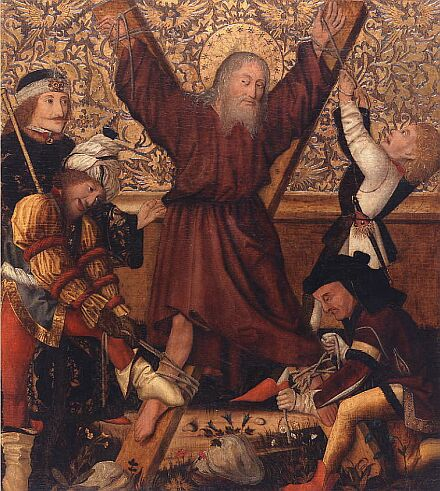
The Martyrdom of Saint Andrew, 1470–1480, Belvedere Galleries

== See also ==
- Curtea Veche – Palace or residence built in 1459

== General and cited sources ==
=== Primary sources ===
- Thomas M. Bohn, Adrian Gheorghe, Albert Weber (Hrsg.): Corpus Draculianum. Dokumente und Chroniken zum walachischen Fürsten Vlad dem Pfähler 1448–1650. Band 3: Die Überlieferung aus dem Osmanischen Reich. Postbyzantinische und osmanische Autoren. Harrassowitz, Wiesbaden 2013, ISBN 978-3-447-06989-2
- Cazacu, Matei (2017). Reinert, Stephen W. (ed.). Dracula. East Central and Eastern Europe in the Middle Ages, 450–1450. Vol. 46. Translated by Brinton, Alice; Healey, Catherine; Mordarski, Nicole; Reinert, Stephen W. Leiden, Boston: Brill. doi:10.1163/9789004349216. ISBN 978-90-04-34921-6.
- Chalkokondyles, Laonikos (2014). The Histories, Volume II: Books 6–10. Translated by Kaldellis, Anthony. Cambridge, MA: Harvard University Press. ISBN 978-0-674-59919-2.

=== Secondary sources ===
- Andreescu, Ștefan (1991). "Military actions of Vlad Țepeș in South-Eastern Europe in 1476". In Treptow, Kurt W. (ed.). Dracula: Essays on the Life and Times of Vlad Țepeș. East European Monographs. Vol. 1833. New York: Columbia University Press. pp. 135–151. ISBN 978-0-88033-220-0.
- Babinger, Franz (1978). Hickman, William C. (ed.). Mehmed the Conqueror and His Time. Bollingen Series. Vol. XCVI. Translated by Manheim, Ralph. Princeton University Press. ISBN 978-0-691-09900-2.
- Balotă, Anton (1991). "An analysis of the Dracula tales". In Treptow, Kurt W. (ed.). Dracula: Essays on the Life and Times of Vlad Țepeș. East European Monographs. Vol. 1833. New York: Columbia University Press. pp. 153–184. ISBN 978-0-88033-220-0.
- Boia, Lucian (1997). History and Myth in Romanian Consciousness. Budapest: Central European University Press. ISBN 978-963-9116-97-9.
- Browning, John Edgar; Picart, Caroline Joan (Kay) (2011). Dracula in Visual Media: Film, Television, Comic Book and Electronic Game Appearances, 1921–2010. Jefferson, NC: McFarland & Company. ISBN 978-0-7864-3365-0.
- Cain, Jimmie E. (2006). Bram Stoker and Russophobia: Evidence of the British Fear of Russia in Dracula and The Lady of the Shroud. Jefferson, NC: McFarland & Company. ISBN 978-0-7864-2407-8.
- Cazacu, Matei (1991). "The reign of Dracula in 1448". In Treptow, Kurt W. (ed.). Dracula: Essays on the Life and Times of Vlad Țepeș. East European Monographs. Vol. 1833. Columbia University Press. pp. 53–61. ISBN 978-0-88033-220-0.
- Cornis-Pope, Marcel; Neubauer, John (2004). History of the Literary Cultures of East-Central Europe: junctures and disjunctures in the 19th and 20th centuries.
- Engel, Pál (2001). The Realm of St Stephen: A History of Medieval Hungary, 895–1526. I.B. Tauris Publishers. ISBN 978-1-86064-061-2.
- Florescu, Radu R.; McNally, Raymond T. (1989). Dracula, Prince of Many Faces: His Life and his Times. Back Bay Books. ISBN 978-0-316-28656-5.
- Florescu, Radu R. (1991). "A genealogy of the family of Vlad Țepeș". In Treptow, Kurt W. (ed.). Dracula: Essays on the Life and Times of Vlad Țepeș. East European Monographs, Distributed by Columbia University Press. pp. 249–252. ISBN 978-0-88033-220-0.
- Hasan, Mihai Florin (2013). "Aspecte ale relațiilor matrimoniale munteano-maghiare din secolele XIV–XV [Aspects of the Hungarian-Wallachian matrimonial relations of the fourteenth and fifteenth centuries]". Revista Bistriței (in Romanian). XXVII: 128–159. ISSN 1222-5096. Archived from the original on 22 December 2024.
- Kaplan, Arie (2011). Dracula: The Life of Vlad the Impaler.
- Kubinyi, András (2008). Matthias Rex. Balassi Kiadó. ISBN 978-963-506-767-1.
- McNally, Raymond T. (1991). "Vlad Țepeș in Romanian folklore". In Treptow, Kurt W. (ed.). Dracula: Essays on the Life and Times of Vlad Țepeș. East European Monographs, Distributed by Columbia University Press. pp. 197–228. ISBN 978-0-88033-220-0.
- Miller, Elizabeth (2005). A Dracula Handbook. Education. ISBN 978-1-4134-8095-5.
- Mureșanu, Camil (2001). John Hunyadi: Defender of Christendom. The Center for Romanian Studies. ISBN 978-973-9432-18-4.
- Nandriș, Grigore (1991). "A philological analysis of Dracula and Romanian place-names and masculine personal names in.a/ea". In Treptow, Kurt W. (ed.). Dracula: Essays on the Life and Times of Vlad Țepeș. East European Monographs, Distributed by Columbia University Press. pp. 229–237. ISBN 978-0-88033-220-0.
- Panaitescu, P. P. (1991). "The German stories about Vlad Țepeș". In Treptow, Kurt W. (ed.). Dracula: Essays on the Life and Times of Vlad Țepeș. East European Monographs, Distributed by Columbia University Press. pp. 185–196. ISBN 978-0-88033-220-0.
- Rezachevici, Constantin (1991). "Vlad Țepeș – Chronology and historical bibliography". In Treptow, Kurt W. (ed.). Dracula: Essays on the Life and Times of Vlad Țepeș. East European Monographs, Distributed by Columbia University Press. pp. 253–294. ISBN 978-0-88033-220-0.
- Rezachevici, Constantin (2001). "The tomb of Vlad Tepes: The most probable hypothesis" (PDF). Journal of Dracula Studies. 4. Archived (PDF) from the original on 9 October 2016.
- Stoicescu, Nicolae (1991). "Vlad Țepeș' relations with Transylvania and Hungary". In Treptow, Kurt W. (ed.). Dracula: Essays on the Life and Times of Vlad Țepeș. East European Monographs, Distributed by Columbia University Press. pp. 81–101. ISBN 978-0-88033-220-0.
- Treptow, Kurt W. (2000). Vlad III Dracula: The Life and Times of the Historical Dracula. The Center of Romanian Studies. ISBN 978-973-98392-2-8.

Vlad the Impaler House of Drăculești Born: 1428–1431 Died: 1477
Regnal titles
Preceded by Vladislav II	Voivode of Wallachia; 1448	Succeeded by Vladislav II
Preceded by Vladislav II	Voivode of Wallachia; 1456–1462	Succeeded by Radu the Handsome
Preceded by Basarab Laiotă	Voivode of Wallachia; 1476	Succeeded by Basarab Laiotă
