= Radu II of Wallachia =

Ruler of Wallachia (died 1427?)

Radu II
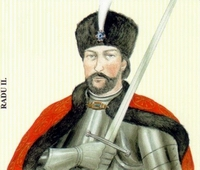

Prince of Wallachia (1st reign)
- Reign: May/August 1420 – before 23 October 1422
- Predecessor: Dan II of Wallachia
- Successor: Dan II of Wallachia

Prince of Wallachia (2nd reign)
- Reign: Summer 1423
- Predecessor: Dan II of Wallachia
- Successor: Dan II of Wallachia

Prince of Wallachia (3rd reign)
- Reign: 10 December 1424 – May 1426
- Predecessor: Dan II of Wallachia
- Successor: Dan II of Wallachia

Prince of Wallachia (4th reign)
- Reign: January – Spring 1427
- Predecessor: Dan II of Wallachia
- Successor: Dan II of Wallachia
- Born: unknown
- Died: 1427/1428?
- Dynasty: House of Basarab
- Father: Mircea I of Wallachia
- Religion: Orthodox

Radu II Praznaglava (Radu II Empty Head/in Old Church Slavonic/), (? – 1427?) was a ruler of Wallachia in the 15th century, ruling for 4 terms, each time preceded by Dan II, his rival for the throne, and each time succeeded by him. Of those 4 periods on the throne of Wallachia, all were within a period of only 7 years, and 3 terms lasted less than a year. He ruled:

- August 1420 – 1422
- summer of 1423
- autumn of 1424
- January – spring of 1427

Son of Mircea cel Batran, he was probably the last voievod of Wallachia to assert control of Banat and southern Basarabia. Dobrogea was lost in 1417. His short intervals of rulership were marked by frequent and violent clashes with his rival and cousin, Dan II, for the throne of the principality. He found shelter and military support from the Ottoman Empire, and it was this submission to the Ottomans which ultimately caused Wallachia to lose Dobrogea and other territories. Radu II is last mentioned in the spring of 1427, when Dan II attacked him from Transylvania, retook the throne, and most probably killed him.

His nickname, as appears in Slavonic writings (Praznaglava), could also be translated as "simple-minded", but the more likely meaning is ”void of hair (bald)”. He is considered an obscure ruler, which placed Wallachia under Ottoman suzerainty.

Radu II of Wallachia House of Basarab Died: after 1427
Regnal titles
Preceded by Dan II	Voivode of Wallachia; 1421	Succeeded by Dan II
Preceded by Dan II	Voivode of Wallachia; 1423	Succeeded by Dan II
Preceded by Dan II	Voivode of Wallachia; 1424–1426	Succeeded by Dan II
Preceded by Dan II	Voivode of Wallachia; 1427	Succeeded by Dan II
