= Turnu Fortress =

Turnu fortress
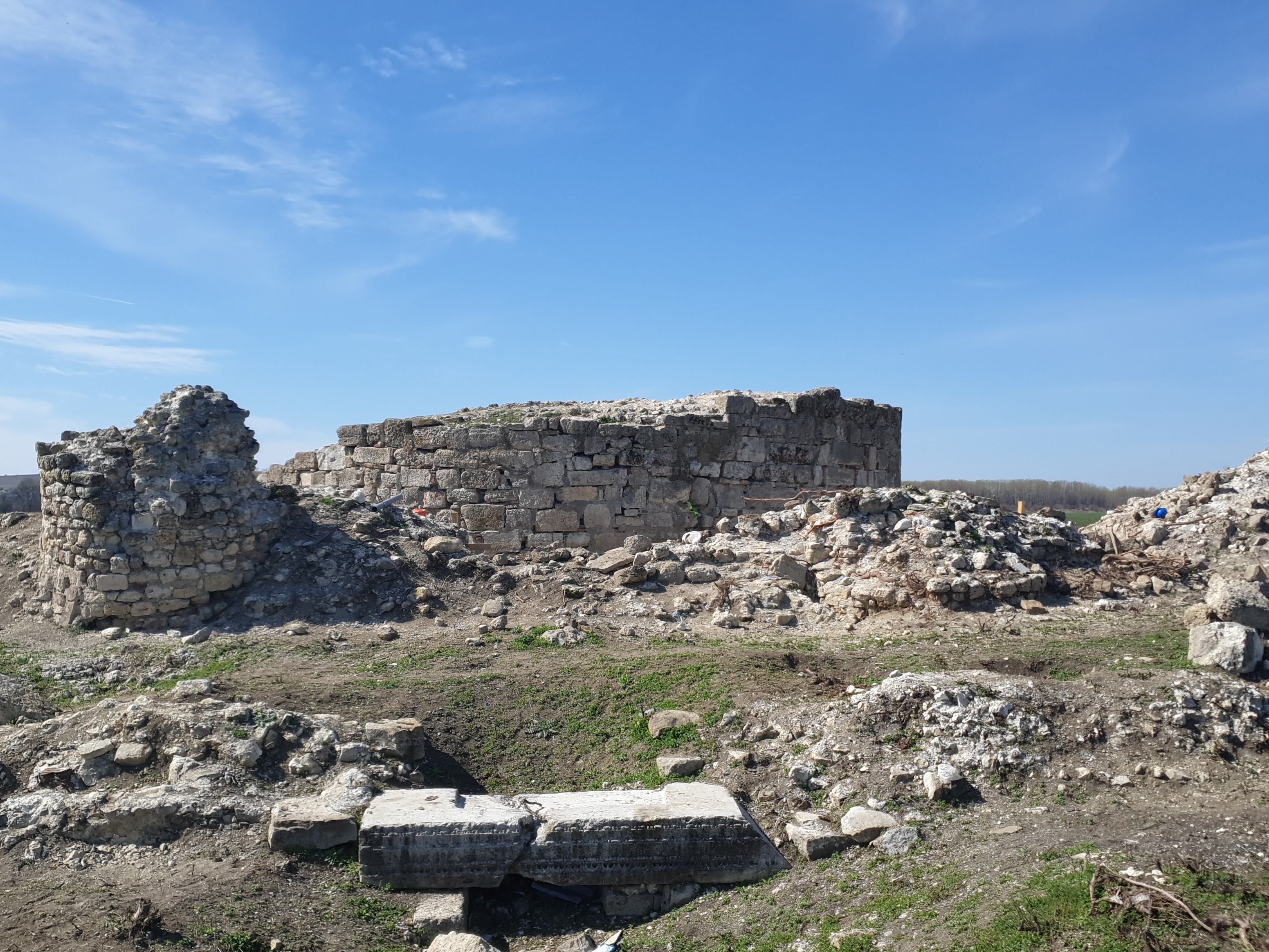
- Turnu fortress – now ruins

- Location within Romania

General information
- Type: Fortress
- Location: Turnu Măgurele, Teleorman County, Turnu Măgurele, Romania
- Coordinates: 43°43′10″N 24°51′45″E
- Completed: late 14th century

The medieval fortress of Turnu (English: tower, Turkish: Kule, also known as Nicopolis minor, Holavnic) is located in the southern part of Turnu Măgurele at a distance of 3 km from the city and 1 km from the confluence of the Olt and Danube rivers in today's Romania. The fortress is documented during the reign of Mircea the Elder (1394) and was built on the Danube line for the defense of Wallachia against the Turkish peril. At the end of the reign of Mircea the Elder, under unclear circumstances, it came under Ottoman occupation to return to the possession of Wallachia only in 1829 when it was burned and demolished.

It is part of the historical monuments list in Teleorman County. Starting in October 2018, it is in a process of restoration and consolidation.

== History ==
=== First attestation (1394–1395) and the Battle of Nicopolis (1396) ===
Following the great Ottoman offensive in the fall of 1394, when the battle of Rovine took place, Mircea the Elder was removed from the throne of Wallachia and replaced by Vlad I (1394–1396) with Turkish help. As a result, in July 1395, a Hungarian expedition led by the Hungarian king Sigismund of Luxembourg aimed on removing Vlad and replacing him with Mircea on the throne of Wallachia succeeded only into conquering the fortress of Turnu. A faithful garrison to the king was left in the city, which disturbed his Wallachian ally. In this context, the first attestation of the city, dating back to 1397, appears in a diploma by Sigismund of Luxembourg, when the battles carried here between 1394 and 1395 are mentioned:

"After our accession to (Wallachia), we flew the Romanians and the Turks with their captains and took the blood of the Nicopolis minor fortress, located in Wallachia, with great bloodshed."

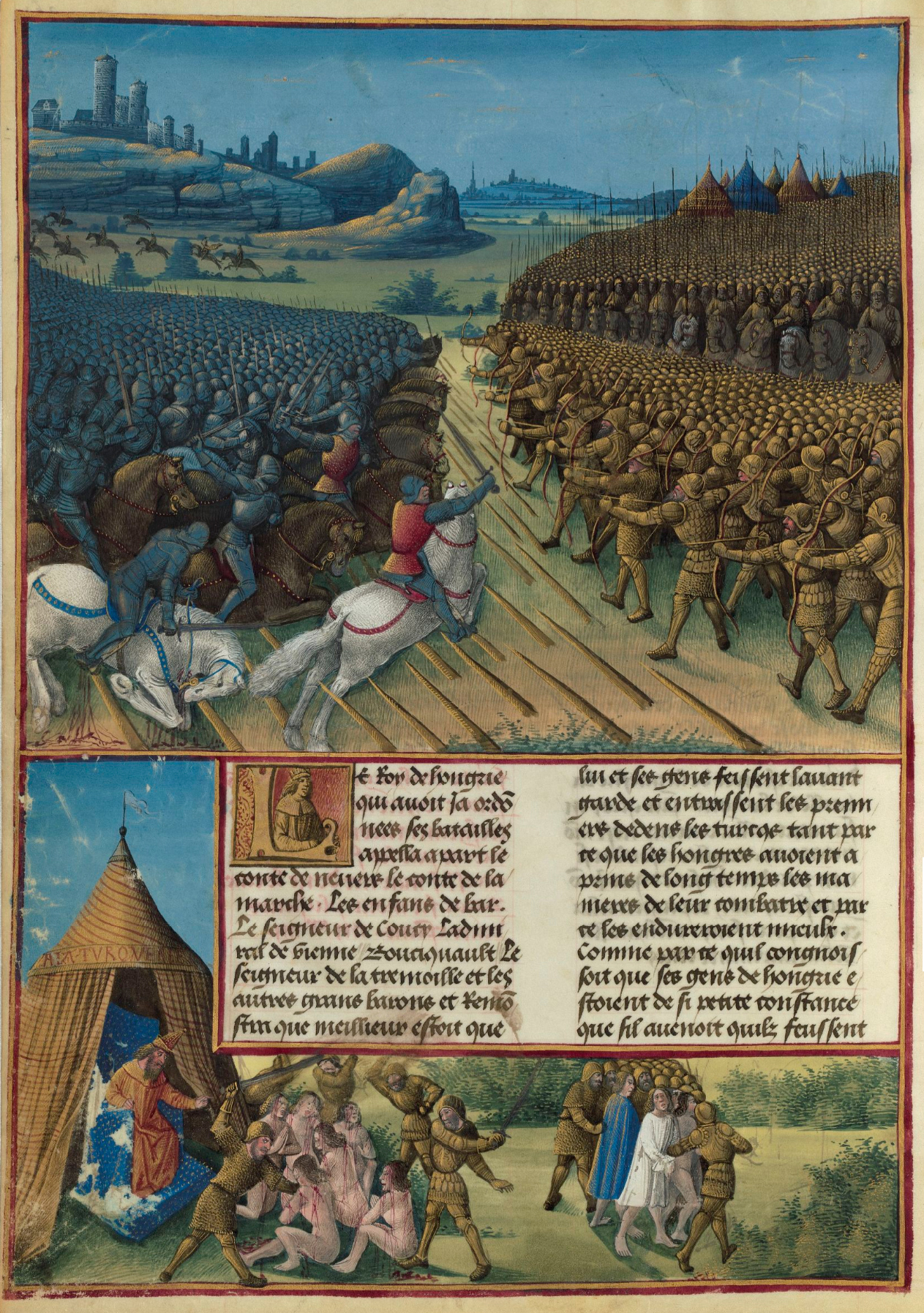
Battle of Nikopolis, 25 September 1396

Throughout the following year, in 1396, the struggles for the removal of Vlad, supported by the Turks, continue, being interrupted only by the King's participation with his vassals, including Mircea the Elder, at the Nicopolis crusade. During this expedition the territory of Wallachia was bypassed, given the important Wallachian and Ottoman military force stationed here. Instead, the Danube route was chosen.

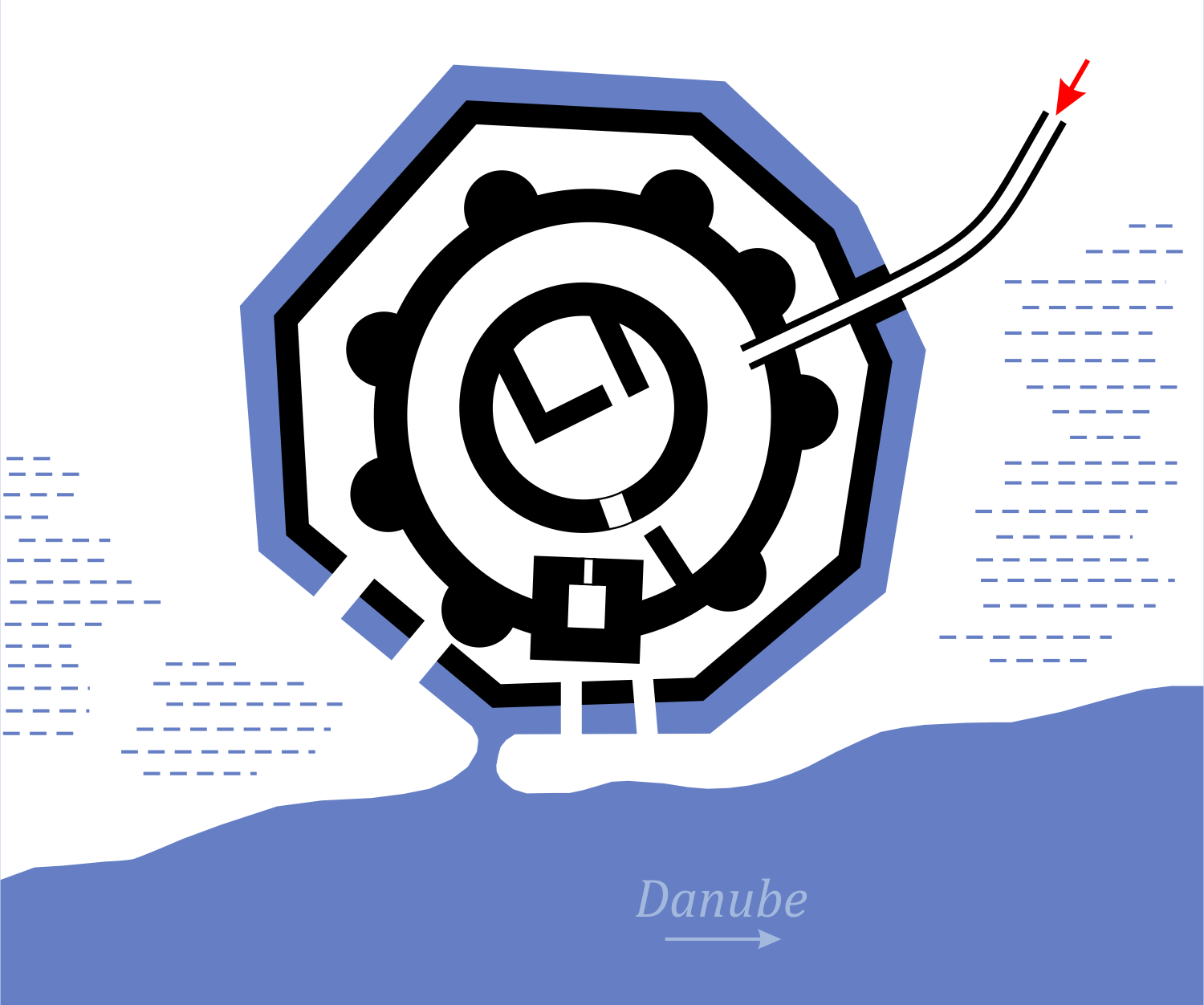
Plan of the medieval fortress Holavnic (Nicopolis minor)

In 1396, Stibor of Stiboricz, the Transylvanian voivode, together with Mircea go to Wallachia, defeated Vlad I, reclaimed the citadel at Turnu, and crossed the Danube to Nicopolis to take part in the crusade. It is likely, due to its proximity, that the fortress played a significant role during the Battle of Nicopolis on September 25, 1396, when a Franco-Wallachian Army commanded by Sigismund of Luxembourg was defeated by the Turkish army led by Bayezid I. In the context of his anti-Ottoman struggle Mircea the Elder participates personally with an army corps at the Nicopolis crusade. The Wallachian army, made up of light cavalry was not invited to take part of the first attack along with the heavy cavalry and withdraws without entering the battle.

In another document by Johann Maroth in 1404, Sigismund also tells how Baiazid I invaded Walachia, deserted it, took the fortress of Nicopolis minor (Turnu fortress) from Prince Mircea by force and left his troops as a garrison.

Other documents from Sigismund's time, written between 1406 and 1408, mention the battles for the little Nicopolis from 1394 to 1395.

=== Transformation into Turkish Raya (1417) ===
The Turnu fortress played an important role in the defensive system of Wallachia, especially during the reign of Mircea the Elder, when the ruler raised the shield against the Ottoman threat in the south of the Danube. This fortress along with Giurgiu, Turtucaia and Brăila from a chain of fortifications along the Danube. In 1417, towards the end of the reign of Mircea the Elder, the Turnu fortress will become Ottoman, being transformed into a Turkish raya like a niyabet from the Nicopolis sanjak, subjected to the pasha of Silistra, along with all the territory within a 15 km radius around the tower. Turnu raya was established after 1419 and included the Turnu fortress and the villages of Flămânda, Măgurele, Odăile, Ciuperceni, Craba and Gârla.

Within the rayas, the Turks had established garrisons by which they constantly supervise Wallachia and Moldova, collect accurate information about the state of affairs and act in case of need. The armed forces cantons here were especially prepared to intervene at the slightest sign of disobedience. In addition, they have the advantage of being directly supported by the Turkish naval fleet. To each raya there was added more or less extensive territories, comprising several villages, which had the task of maintaining the garrisons. For example, Turnu had 3 villages, Giurgiu 25, and Brăila about 50 villages. Because they were located in very good commercial areas, the rayas were used for trade between the Romanian countries (almost monopolized by the Ottomans) and the Ottoman Empire. Here taxes were collected or goods were being stored. The Wallachian rulers held a diplomatic agent called capuchehaie in each raya of the country's territory.

The rayas in Wallachia do not seem to have been turned into military feuds; they constituted territories owned by high-ranking state officials. Thus, in the 17th century Giurgiu was given the command of the Danube fleet of war; Turnu was in the possession of a member of the sultan's family.

=== The Battle of Turnu (June 1462) ===
During the reign of Vlad Ţepeş and in the context of his conflict with the Ottoman Empire, the Turnu fortress is for a short time under Romanian rule. Vlad Țepeș organizes a surprise campaign south of the Danube in the winter 1461/1462 when the Nicopolis fortress was conquered and over 20,000 Turks were killed by Wallachians. Following the raids of the Wallachian army south of the Danube, sultan Mahomed II decided to attack Wallachia and headed a large army to Targovishte. The Sultan went to Wallachia in April 1462 with an army of 80,000 to 100,000 soldiers. The official scribe of the great vizier Mahmud Pasha, a direct participant in the events, presents a very well-organized force, equipped with armed men with shining armor. Vlad has been gathering his troops on the Danube since May 15, aiming to prevent Ottoman troops from entering the country. The Ottoman troops attempted to cross the river in early 1462 at Nicopolis-Turnu, but they did not succeed because the Wallachian army was waiting on the left bank. After they passed, the Ottomans attacked Vlad Tepes' army, but they were repulsed. The Romanians counterattacked but were stopped by the fire supported by the 120 bombs. Țepeș ordered a withdrawal and adopted the tactic of leaving the Ottomans to starve and thirst and attacking them by surprise.

In front of a superior army, the Wallachian ruler withdraws the people to the mountains and forests, and attracts the Ottomans inside the country through continuous harassment. His objective was to find a good place for the surprise attack, which will take place near Târgovişte on June 17, 1462.

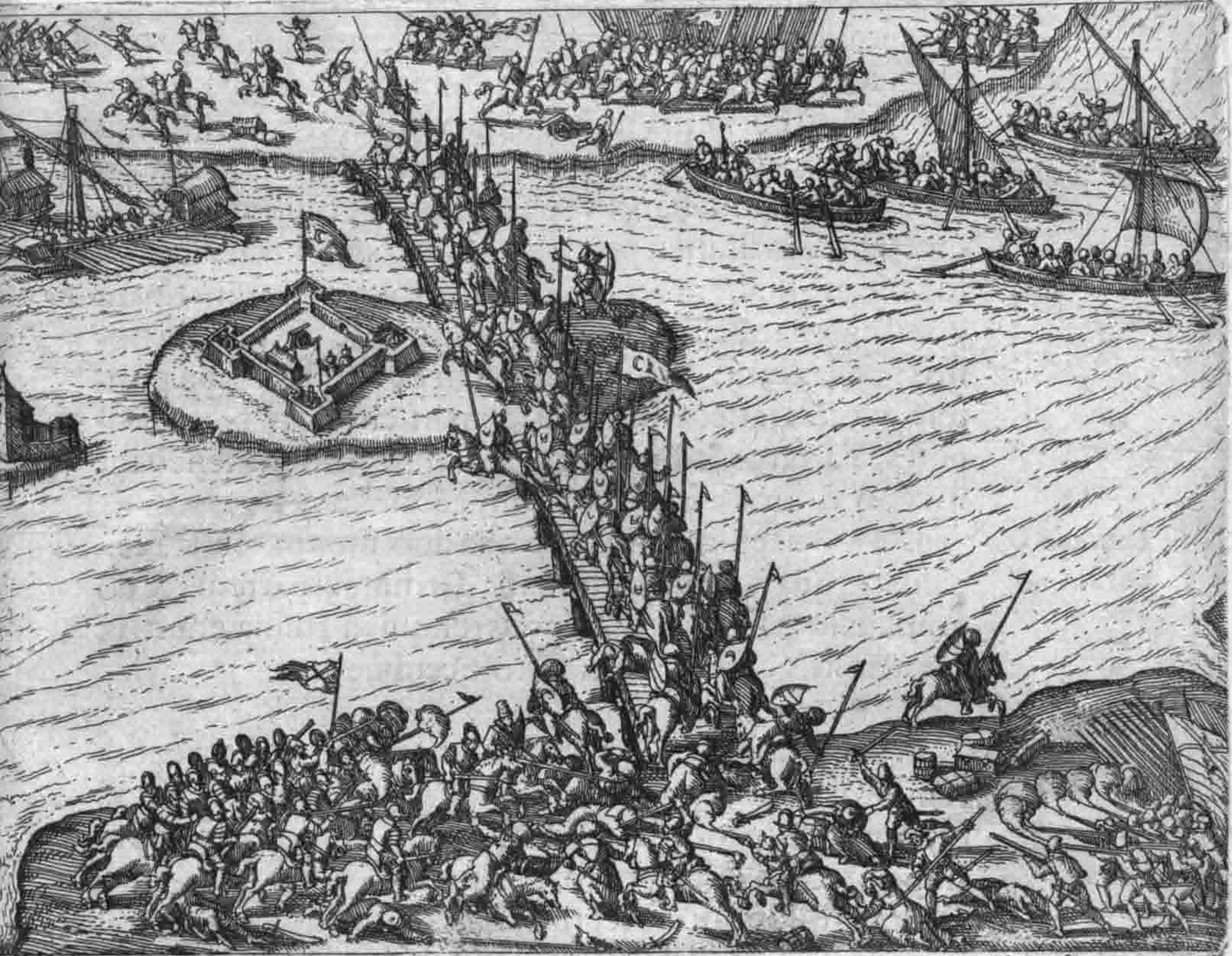
Battle of Giurgiu – Woodcut(1596)

=== Michael the Brave conquers the fortress (1594–1595) ===
In the context of the Ottoman Power rising a "Holy League" was created as an alliance between the Christian countries struggling to stop the expansion of the Ottoman Empire to Western Europe. The accession of Wallachia to the "Holy League" led to the outbreak on 13 November 1594 of an anti-Ottoman rebellion that resulted in the killing of all the levantine creditors and the entire Ottoman garrison stationed in Bucharest. On this background, known as The Long War, prince Michael the Brave starts a general offensive against the Turkish Empire attacking the Ottoman fortresses on both sides of the Danube (Giurgiu, Hârşova, Silistra, etc.).

The campaign of harassment of the Turks from the north of the Danube led to the Ottoman withdrawal in the cities along the river, where, taking advantage of the stationing of Ottoman troops in the winter camps in the Belgrade area, the Romanians attacked the Giurgiu and Turnu fortresses and managed to release civil settlements. In January 1595 all the left bank of the river was under Romanian control. Turnu remained under Wallachian command during Michael the Brave's reign. The fortress fell under Turkish control after the death of Michael the Brave on the Câmpia Turzii on August 9, 1601.

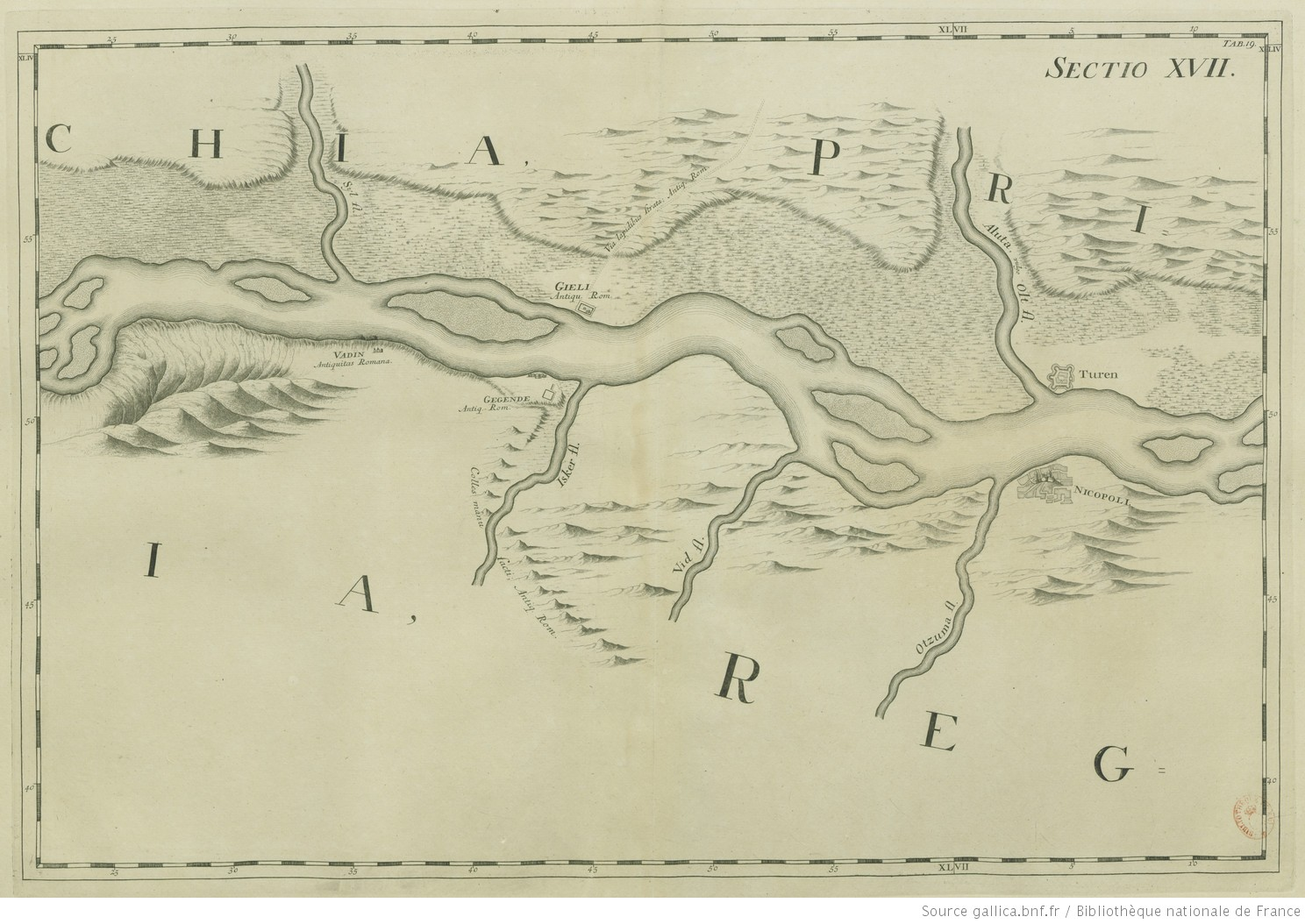
Nikopolis and Turnu fortresses by Luigi Ferdinando Marsigli (1726)

=== Iancu Jianu's outlaws (1809) ===
In 1809, Iancu Jianu's outlaws raided the Turkish citadels on south of the Danube when Vidin and Plevna were being burned, killing the Turkish population in response to the actions of the Vidin pasha Osman Pazvantoglu who had attacked Craiova and burned the villages of Oltenia.

Jianu's Oltenians destroy the Turnu fortress, which had become the incursion base when Osman Pazvantoglu attacked Wallachia.

=== Returning to Wallachia (1829) ===
Following the Russian-Turkish War of 1828/1829, the Adrianople Peace Treaty of 1829 established that the border between the Ottoman Empire and Wallachia was to be fixed on the Danube, so that the fortress of Turnu, together with the Braila and Giurgiu rayas, definitively returned to Wallachia. Upon returning to Muntenia, the Turnu fortress was demolished, burned, and the territory of the former raya was incorporated into Wallachia. After the demolition in 1829, the ruins of the fortress were used as construction material for locals and local authorities. The settlements of Turnu raya are embedded in the Olt County.

== Archeological facts ==
Archaeological research has shown that the fortress consisted of a central tower, an enclosure wall that surrounded the tower about 6 m away from it and a defense ditch bordered on the inside by a wall and on the outside by an escarpment. The central tower had a diameter of 17.40 m and a wall thickness of 3 m. It stored ammunition and grain and was covered with tiles. The wall had an irregular polygonal route, and its thickness varied between 4 and 5 meters. On it there were placed massive bastions. The wall that bordered the interior of the defense ditch was 1.50–2 m thick and included an access area from which a drawbridge descended. There was a counter-escarpment on the outside.

In a document found and dated 1397-1398 it is called "Holavnic". The same name appears in 1531 in a map of Johann Homann in the form "Cholonic", with the notation: Nicopolis Minor. A document of Alexandru Aldea from 1432 mentions the fortress of Pirgos ("Tower" in Greek has the form Pyrgos), identifying with the fortress of Turnu. Gh. I. Cantacuzino, suggests that he designates the fortress of Pirgos on the right bank of the Danube. In foreign documents up to the 16th century, the fortress appears exclusively called "Little Nicopol", as a pendant of the fortress on the other bank of the Danube.

The Turnu fortress is recorded by August Treboniu Laurian in the Historical Store for Dacia from 1846 stating that the fortress was built on the ruins of a Roman tower.

The manuscript Archaeological Excursion (1869) by Cezar Bolliac (a copy from the late 1930s according to the text published in the Official Gazette no. 222-224) describes a campaign of archaeological excavations 4 decades after the fortress was abandoned. Bolliac's observations and actions from the fortress of Turnu concluded that this was in fact the Roman fortress of Romula. From his description we notice two aspects: the fact that Cezar Bolliac is one of the first, if not the first archaeologist who demolished the old tower and that, although "I could not find anything around it", he could undo it on all sides so that " its outline is taken." In fact, the material used to build the first phase of the fortress, during the period of Mircea the Elder, was brought from the former Roman camp at Oescus, located south of the Danube, as Grigore Florescu would later suggest.
