= War of the South Danube (1420–1432) =

Sixth confrontation between the Kingdom of Hungary and the Ottoman Empire in the Balkans

- Part of Hungarian–Ottoman Wars
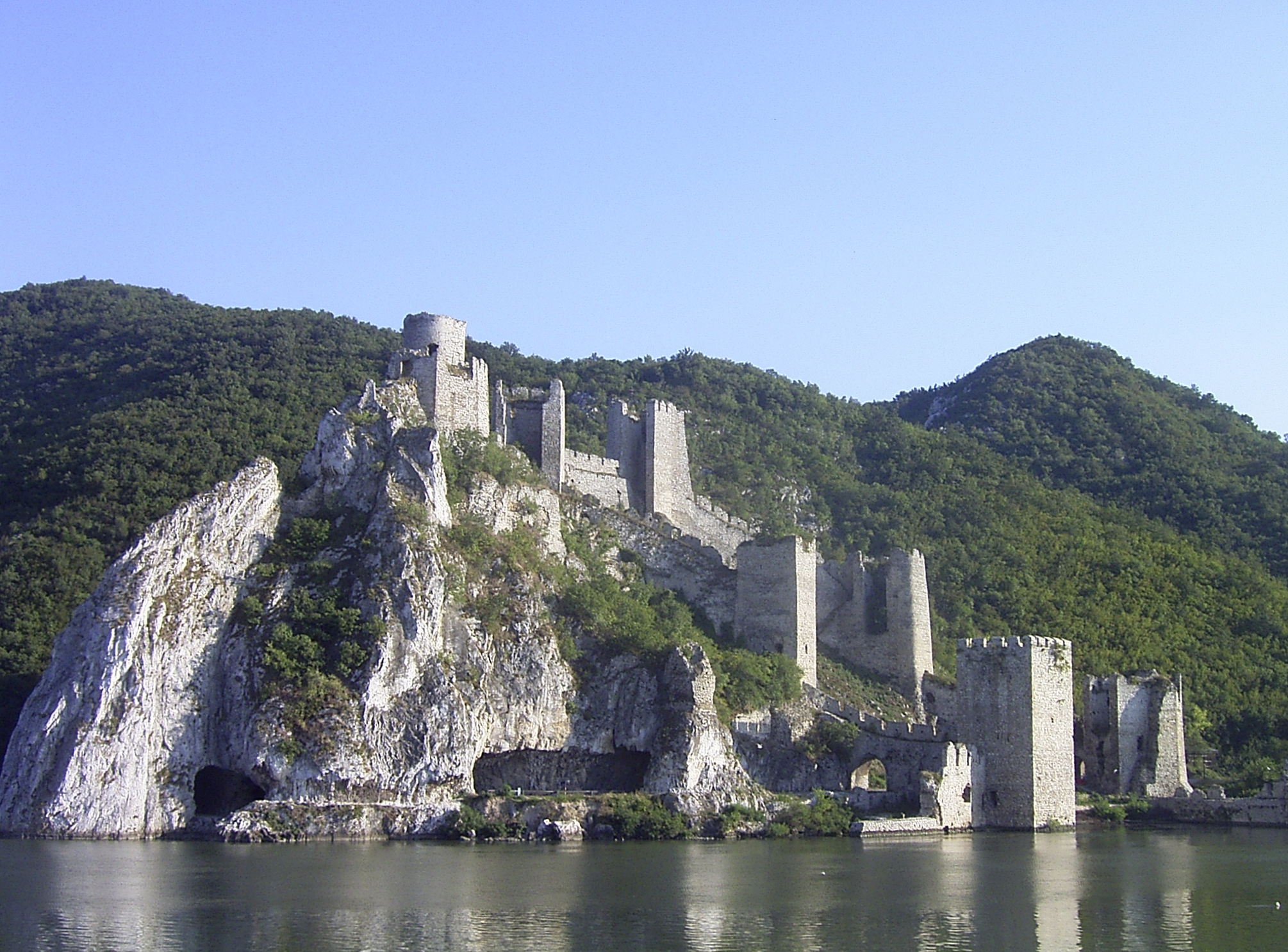
- Golubac fortress
Date	1420–1432
Location	Danube, Balkans, Kingdom of Hungary,
Result	Indecisive
Territorial changes	Serbian Despotate becomes vassal state of the Ottoman Empire

Belligerents
Kingdom of Hungary; Kingdom of Croatia; Principality of Wallachia; Kingdom of Bosnia; Serbian Despotate supported by: Grand Duchy of Lithuania	Ottoman Empire

Commanders and leaders
Sigismund; Miklós Csáki; Stephen Rozgonyi; Pippo Spano (Wallachia) Dan II (Kingdom of Bosnia) Tvrtko II; Stefan Lazarević; Zawisza Czarny †	(Ottoman Empire) Murad II (Ottoman Empire) Isa Bey

Strength
25,000; 19,000 Hungarians and Lithuanians; 6,000 Wallachians	Unknown

The War of the South Danube (1420–1432) was the sixth confrontation between the Kingdom of Hungary and the Ottoman Empire in the Balkans. The war was characterized by extensive destruction of the areas affected by hostilities.

== Background ==
Following Sigismund of Luxembourg successful campaign in the southern region in 1419, a peace treaty, albeit more of a truce, was established with the Ottoman Empire in Nagyvárad for a duration of 5 years. Despite this agreement, the Ottomans, the following spring of the subsequent year, led a significant army through the Vulcan Pass into Transylvania, defeating the unprepared forces of Voivode Miklós Csáki at Hațeg, seizing Orăștie, and devastating it.

== War ==
In 1421, Turkish forces advanced through the Predeal Pass into Transylvania. After the demise of Mircea the Elder, the Voivode of Wallachia, in 1419, his illegitimate son Michael I of Wallachia seized the Voivode seat. However, Dan II of Wallachia, the deceased Voivode grandnephew, swiftly expelled Mircea with Turkish assistance. Despite Mircea's appeal to King Sigismund for aid, the king's focus on the Hussite Wars limited his support. Consequently, Dan retained the Voivode title permanently, solidifying his position by pledging allegiance to Sigismund. This move likely incited Sultan Mehmed I's successor, Murad II, to dispatch a substantial army to punish Dan, traversing Wallachia and the Predeal Pass into Transylvania. The invading force besieged Brassó and ravaged Barcaság, leaving its inhabitants to witness the destruction of their homes and possessions from the safety of the fortress. Allegedly, Dan fled with two vessels, potentially acting as a guide for his former allies through the Predeal Pass into Transylvania.

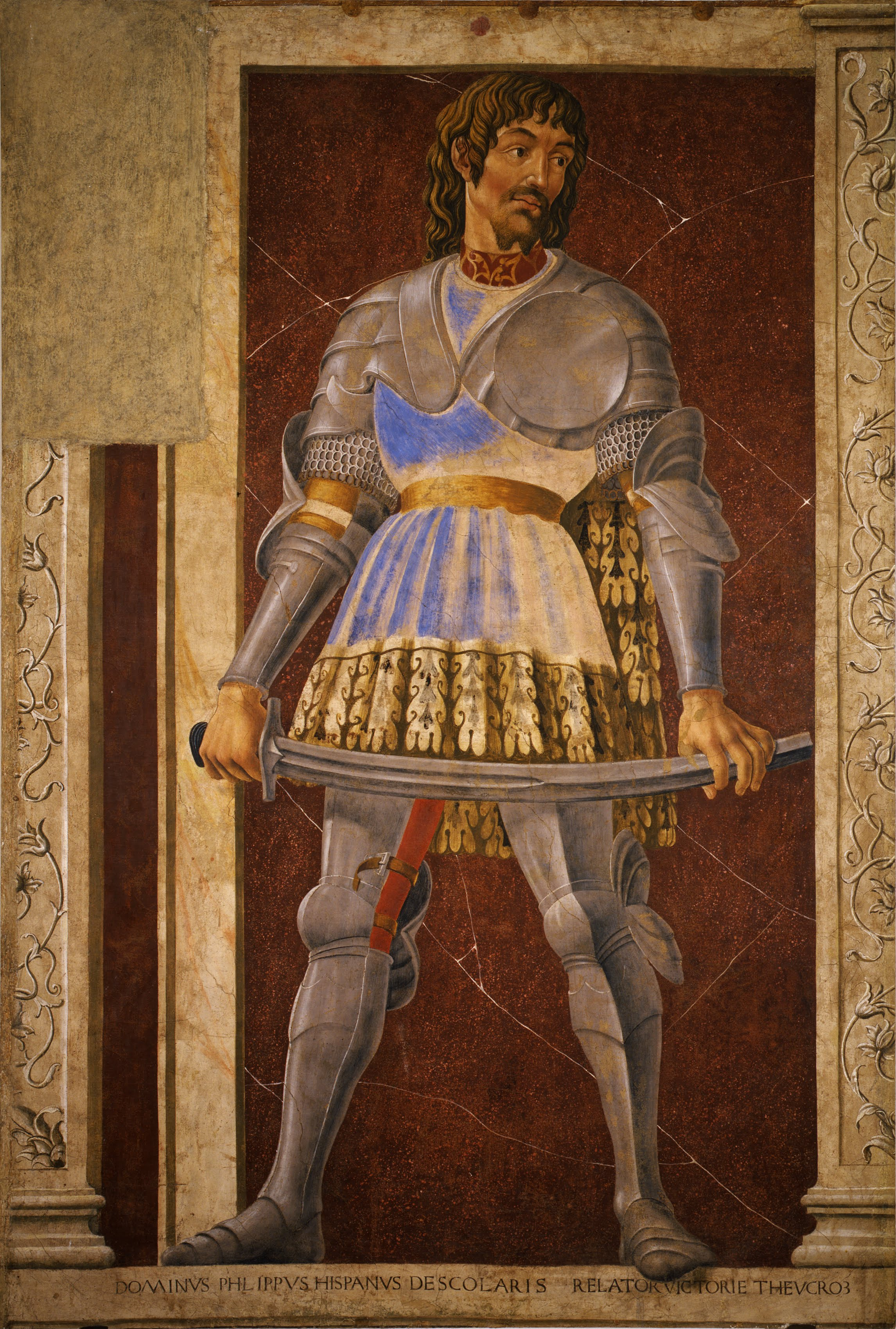
Pippo Spano

These incursions persisted, originating from Giurgiu, an Ottoman stronghold established for monitoring Wallachia and Moldova's Voivodes. To counter these repeated assaults, King Sigismund dispatched Pippo Spano with troops withdrawn from Moravia in the spring of 1423 to Wallachia. In the same year's autumn, Pippo achieved a significant victory over a Turkish force of approximately 15,000 near the Bulgarian border. The news of this triumph prompted the Byzantine Emperor Manuel II Palaiologos to propose to King Sigismund a joint campaign against the Turks. However, Sigismund's inability to fulfill promises, both to Manuel and his soon-to-be-deceased son, John VIII, led the emperor to seek peace with the Sultan at considerable expense.

In the summer of 1424, Sigismund willingly agreed to a new 2-year armistice with Turkish envoys in Buda. Murad, keen to focus on subduing his rebellious brother in Asia, swiftly accepted this truce after already reconciling with the princes of Wallachia and Serbia. Surprisingly, Murad took no action regarding Kingdom of Bosnia, where the Turks not only failed to advance but also lost ground. After Isa Bey Ishaković's defeat and demise, his forces dispersed, allowing Vrboszna to return to Bosnian control. Moreover, internal conflicts among the Bosnian nobles, resolved with Tvrtko II of Bosnia coronation as Bosnian king in September 1421, prompted Tvrtko to seek alliances with Republic of Venice initially but ultimately with Sigismund due to increased Turkish incursions.

As Dan, the Voivode of Wallachia, was excluded from the Turkish-Hungarian armistice, Sultan's agreement to install Dan's brother, Radu II of Wallachia, under Hungary's protection as the Voivode in 1425 was readily granted. Dan sought refuge with Sigismund, who seized the opportunity to strengthen Hungary's feudal ties with Wallachia, despite anticipating Sultan's opposition and potential breach of the armistice. Consequently, Sigismund mobilized his forces, sending Pippo Spano along the Danube and Miklos Csáki through the Transylvanian mountains into Wallachia, while positioning a reserve group near Orsova on August 16.

Further actions of these groups remain unrecorded, although the Hussite victories prompted Sigismund's departure, likely with a portion of the army, to Bohemia, while the rest continued border skirmishes to wear down the enemy. Upon returning to Hungary, Sigismund entertained Stefan Lazarević, the Serbian despot, in Tata in September 1426. Lazarević sought Hungarian sovereignty for his nephew, Đorđe, son of Vuk Branković, to secure the Serbian throne. An agreement was reached, with Stefan pledging loyalty to Hungary and enrolling Đorđe among the barons of the kingdom. In 1426, Pippo Spano defeated the Turks in a pitched battle near Golubac, but suffered a stroke shortly after the battle and was carried to Lippa where he died.

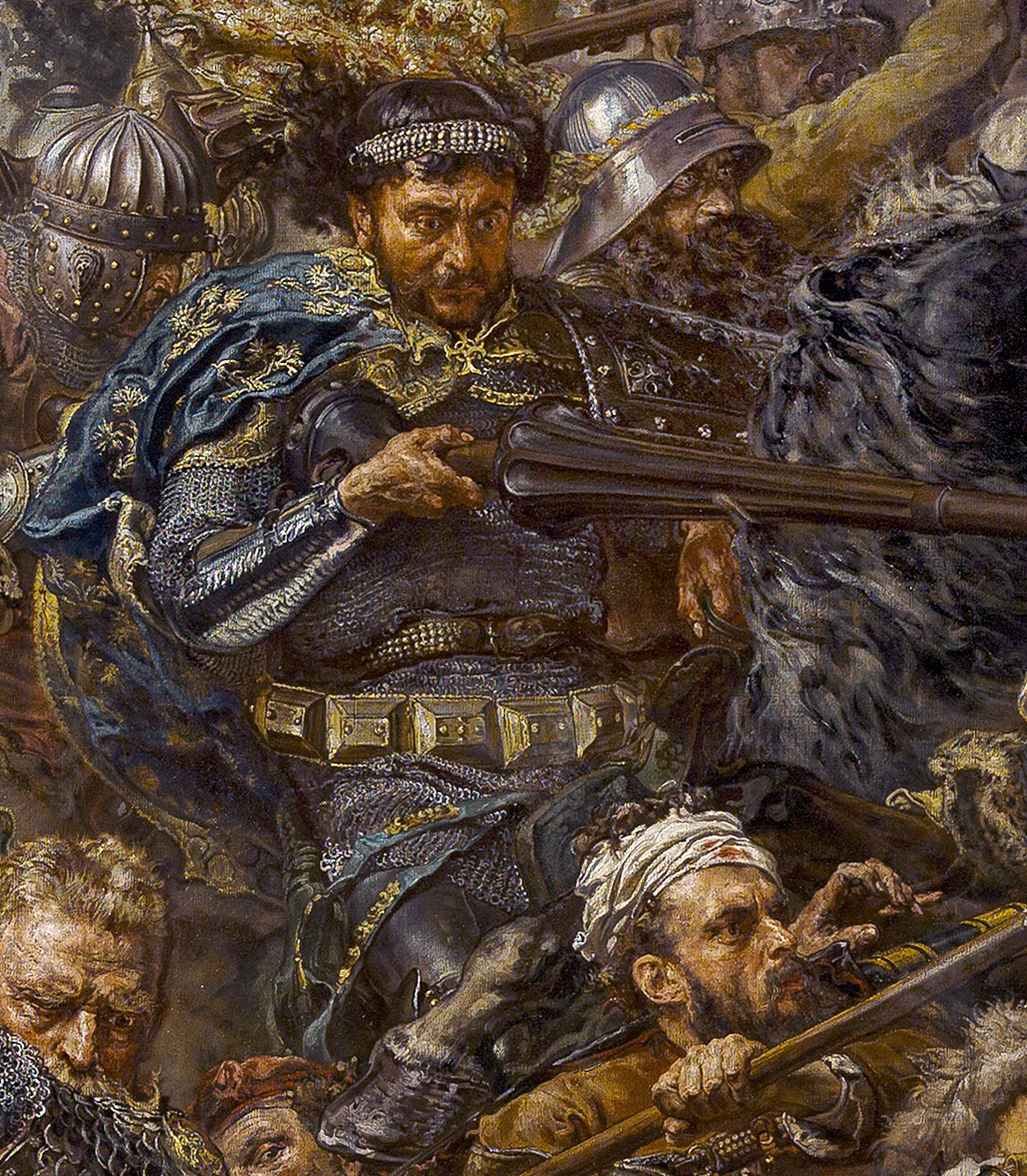
Zawisza the Black

In the spring of 1428, amidst tensions with the Ottoman Empire, King Sigismund of Hungary mobilized a substantial army near the newly erected Castle of Saint Ladislaus, strategically positioned to serve as a bastion against Turkish incursions. Although hastily constructed, the fortress boasted formidable defenses, making it a suitable base for the upcoming campaign. Led by Stephen Rozgonyi, the Count of Temes, the Hungarian force, totaling approximately 25,000 soldiers, was bolstered by auxiliary troops dispatched by Vytautas the Great, the Grand Duke of Lithuania, under the command of Zawisza the Black of Garbów, known as Zawisza the Black. Additionally, Dan, the Voivode of Wallachia, contributed 6000 seasoned warriors to the expedition. Their absence was notable, Moldavian and Serbian contingents, under Alexander and Branković respectively, reflecting the fragile alliances and shifting loyalties in the region.

To address Moldavia's perceived negligence in defense, Sigismund sought to revise the territorial division outlined in the Treaty of Lubowla of 1412 during a diplomatic meeting with King Władysław of Poland in early 1429. However, Władysław II Jagiełło's reluctance to alter the status quo hindered Sigismund's ambitions for a unified front against the Ottomans.

With his forces assembled, Sigismund embarked on a bold campaign, crossing the Danube in early May to besiege Golubac, a key Ottoman stronghold. The siege, conducted both by land and water, was fiercely contested by the Turkish defenders, who repelled repeated assaults with steadfast resolve. As news of Sultan Murad's advancing relief force reached Sigismund, the Hungarian king, wary of confronting a numerically superior enemy, proposed a ceasefire. However, the Sultan's acceptance was marred by treachery, as Turkish forces launched a surprise attack during the Hungarian retreat, resulting in a tragic massacre. Sigismund narrowly escaped the ambush, thanks to the courageous intervention of Rozgonyi and his loyal warriors.

== Aftermath ==
Despite the setback at Golubac, Sigismund regrouped in Temesvár, where he prioritized the reinforcement of Belgrade's fortifications and negotiated a three-year ceasefire with Sultan Murad, who was preoccupied with unrest in Asia.

Meanwhile, the Ottoman army, divided into smaller contingents, rampaged through Serbia before turning its sights on Bosnia. Dan, attempted to appease the Sultan by paying tribute, but peace was short-lived. In a dramatic turn of events, Vlad II Dracul, the son of the Voivode Mircea the Elder, seized power from Dan, prompting Turkish intervention. Vlad sought refuge with Sigismund, who supported his bid to reclaim the throne. However, Vlad's subsequent loyalty to the sultan underscored the unstable nature of alliances in this turbulent region.

== See also ==
- Siege of Golubac
- Sigismund of Luxembourg
- Hungarian–Ottoman War (1415–1419)

== Sources ==
- Kupelwieser Leopold, Die Kämpfe Ungarns mit den Osmanen bis zur Schlacht bei Mohács, 1526, Legare Street Press 2023 ISBN 1021488518
- Lewicki Anatol, Ein Blick in die Politik König Sigismunds gegen Polen in Bezug auf die Hussitenkriege, Kessinger Publishing 2010 ISBN 1168338549
- Sándor Szilágyi, Schönherr Gyula, A magyar nemzet története III.- Az Anjou ház és örökösei (1301-1439), Budapest 1895 ISBN 963776576X
- Windecke Eberhard, Das Leben König Sigmunds, 2013 ISBN 9783955643867
- Zinkeisen Johann, Geschichte des osmanischen Reiches in Europa, BiblioBazaar 2009 ISBN 1117343197
