= Church of St. Athanasius in Poroishte =

Dug-in church in Bulgaria

Coordinates: 43.4875°N 26.5758°E

The Orthodox church of St. Athanasius is a church in Poroishte, Bulgaria, near Razgrad. It was built in the 17th century, and was built with a single nave dug into the ground. Nowadays, it is the only dug-in church left from the Ottoman rule in Northeastern Bulgaria.

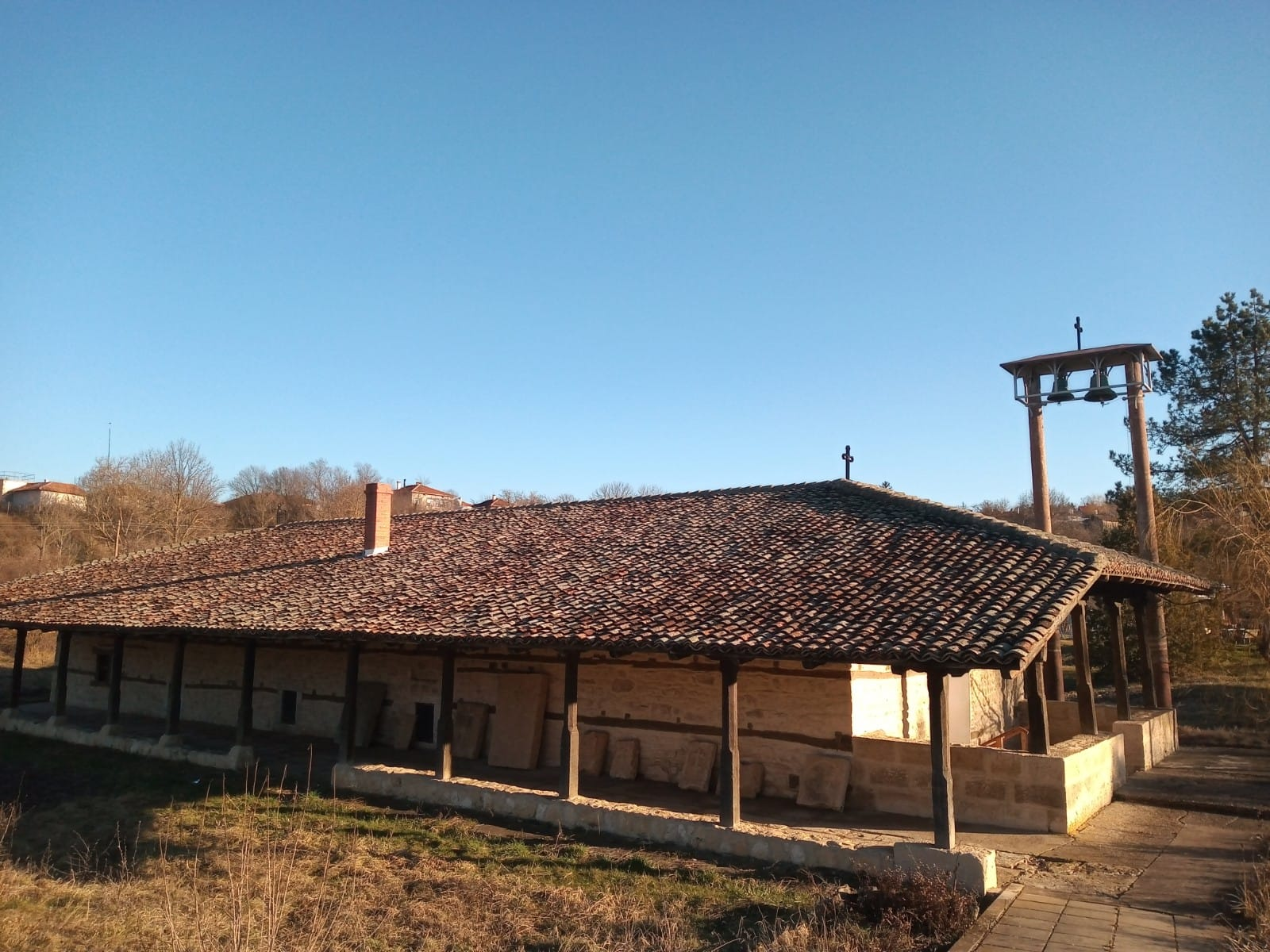
Orthodox Dug-in Church in Poroishte

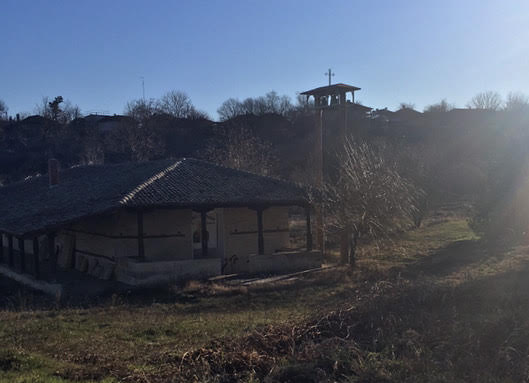
The exterior of the dug-in church in Poroischte

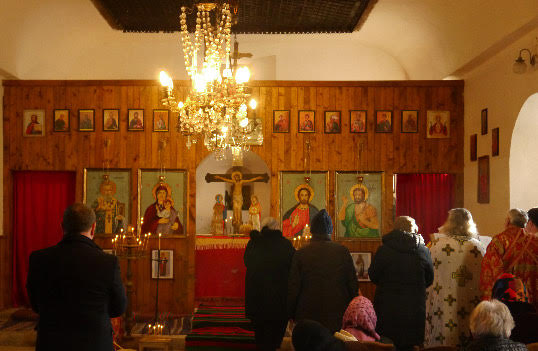
The interior of the dug-in church in Poroischte

== History ==
At the start of the 17th century, the wealthy dwellers of the village of Arnaut Kui, now Poroishte near Razgrad, decided to construct four places of worship bearing the names of Christian Orthodox saints – St. Demetrios, St. Nicholas, St. Virgin Mary, and St. Athanasius. All four temples were erected in the characteristic Arbanas (meaning “Albanian” in Bulgarian) style of sacred architecture – completely built out of stone glued together by mud mortar, semi dug-in, with a single nave and two premises: a narthex (vestibule) and an elongated inner space (nave), lavishly decorated frescoes, and a gable roof.

In 1810, during the Russo-Turkish war, the village was set on fire and some of the churches were destroyed. After the end of the war, the members of no more than 30 households returned to Arnaut Kui, gradually mixing with newly arrived families from the Balkan, more precisely from the areas of Elena and Tarnovo.

Another Russo-Turkish War of 1828-1829 brought about more migratory waves of people from the Balkan settling in the village. In the aftermath of the subsequent Treaty of Adrianople of 1829 between Imperial Russia and the Ottoman Empire, the people of Arnaut Kui took the decision of reconstructing the St. Athanasius church. To comply with the existing Ottoman instructions about the height of a Christian temple, the foundations of the building had to be removed by 1.80 m further down in the ground. In this process, a water spring gushed out, whose waters had to be conducted to a recently built slaughterhouse in the same vicinity. Nevertheless, remnants of that groundwater spring still damage parts of the church walls.

== Description ==
The newly built church was single nave and deeply dug into the ground, evidence of which is the set of eleven steps leading to the nave. The 120 clay pots built into the walls of the church additionally enhance the acoustics of the edifice. Initially, the temple could be approached through massive wooden doors at the northern side by male worshippers only, and at the western side by female church goers.

Beneath the gable roof covered with semi-cylindrical clay tiles is a spacious narthex encompassing the western and northern sides of the church. The narthex is supported by wooden pillars and is paved with stone slabs, some of which are engraved gravestones. The temple inside is paved with the same type of slabs. Before the Liberation (1878), the church used clappers; later, a bell tower was added.

Over the 19th century and the first half of the 20th century, the church stood in the center of an ensemble of buildings of various religious and lay functions, including a cemetery in the churchyard, a school, a community hall, residential and other structures. Subsequently, all buildings, apart from the church, were destroyed.

== Status ==
In 1976 St. Athanasius Church was declared a monument of culture of historical and architectural significance. The temple is considered the only surviving semi dug-in church in Northeastern Bulgaria and the oldest Christian Orthodox place of worship preserved in the region of Razgrad. The parts actually preserved from the past involve the general framework of the building, its doors and the ceiling. The feast day of St. Athanasius is on 18 January, when a liturgy is usually held by the Bishop of Ruse Diocese.
