= Wallachian campaign (1420) =

1420 Ottoman invasion of Wallachia

- Part of the War of the South Danube (1420–1432) and Ottoman–Wallachian wars
Date	Spring – Summer 1420
Location	Wallachia
Result	Ottoman victory

Belligerents
Ottoman Empire; Wallachian opposition	Wallachia

Commanders and leaders
(Ottoman Empire) Mehmed I Dan II	Michael I †

Strength
60,000–80,000 (Romanian claim, likely exaggerated)	Unknown

Casualties and losses
Unknown	Heavy; many enslaved

The Wallachian campaign of 1420 or Battle of Wallachia was a military expedition by the Ottoman army of Sultan Mehmed I aimed at subjugating and devastating Wallachia. It took place from spring to summer 1420 and led to the death of Wallachian Voivode Michael I.

== Prelude ==
In 1415, Wallachian voivode Mircea the Elder begun tribute payments to the porte. However, his successor Michael I stopped paying tribute in 1418, attempting to form an anti-Ottoman alliance with his neighbors.

In 1419, Ottomans attacked Wallachia and the clashes occurred at Severin, which ended inconclusively. The following year, Sultan Mehmed I would send a much larger army to devastate Wallachia, exploiting the fact that the Hungarian army was focused on the Hussite Wars, leaving Michael I of Wallachia without allies.

== Campaign ==
In late April or early May 1420, Sultan Mehmed I led an army of Ottoman troops mobilised from Anatolia and Rumelia, declaring the expedition into Wallachia to be a "holy war against the infidels". Ottoman fleet was responsible for capturing the Danube and Pontic fortresses.

The Ottomans plundered the entire country and took many slaves. The Ottoman forces then captured Isaccea and Enisala, forcing voivode Michael I to flee and seek Hungarian aid. However, his Ottoman-backed rival Dan II caught up with him and confronted him in battle, as a result of which Michael I was killed.

== Aftermath ==
The campaign resulted in Ottoman victory and the death of Wallachian voivode Michael I, including subsequent murder of his family members. Polish king Władysław II Jagiełło commented the following on the brutality that occurred in this campaign:

The Ottomans, driven by anger, invaded and completely devastated the lands of Wallachia with the full strength of their armies; passing through with fire and sword, after many and unspeakable murders and robberies, they subjected them entirely, and, having taken oaths of allegiance from them by terrible tortures, they received terrible tributes and gifts.

The same year, Ottomans launched an attack on the Moldavian fortress of Chilia, but were repulsed. Radu II was then placed in charge of Wallachia the following year. Dan II temporarily held power prior and would continue getting involved in power struggles over the throne of Wallachia.

The biggest consequence of the campaign was that Wallachia lost control over Dobruja, Severin and its Danube fortresses, becoming more dependent on the porte. The principality now had to constantly shift its allegiance between the Kingdom of Hungary and Ottoman Empire, with porte also placing military obligations on Wallachia to assist the Ottoman Empire during its wars.
