= Elie Cristo-Loveanu =

Romanian artist

- Born: 27 July 1893; Turnu Măgurele, Romania
- Died: 28 April 1964 (aged 70); New York, New York, United States
- Occupation: Artist

Elie Cristo-Loveanu (27 July 1893 – 28 April 1964) was a Romanian-born artist and educator who moved to the United States in 1922. His work was part of the art competition at the 1932 Summer Olympics. Cristo-Loveanu became adjunct professor of Romance Languages at Columbia University in 1942 and Columbia had commissioned him in 1950 to do a portrait painting of Dwight David Eisenhower, who was then the president of the university.
