= Turnu Măgurele =

- Municipality
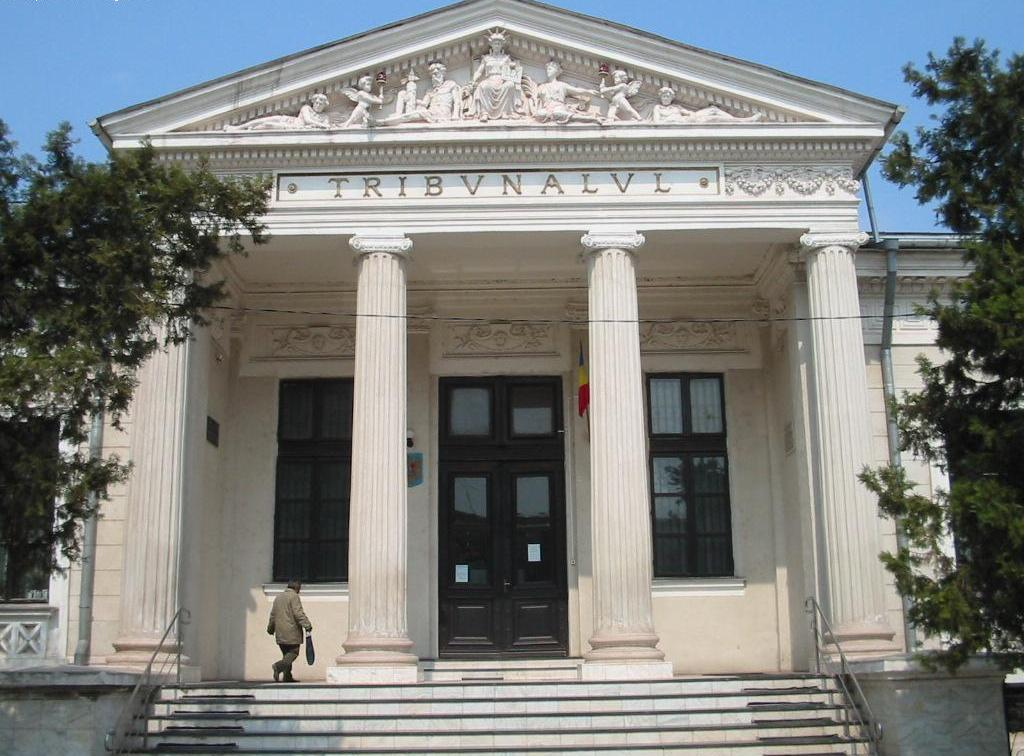
- Turnu Măgurele City Court

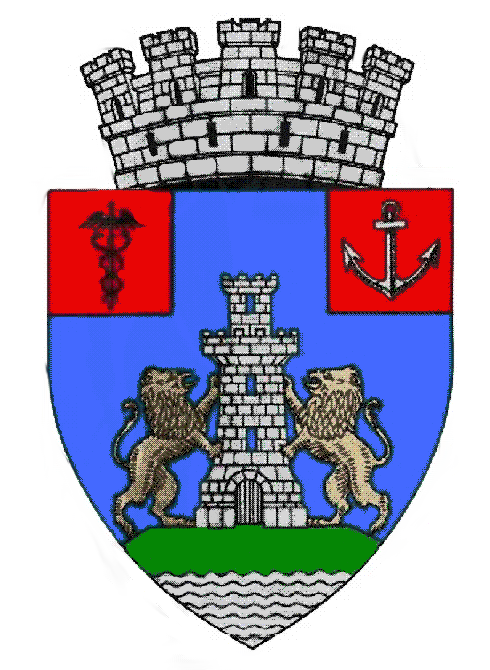
- Coat of arms

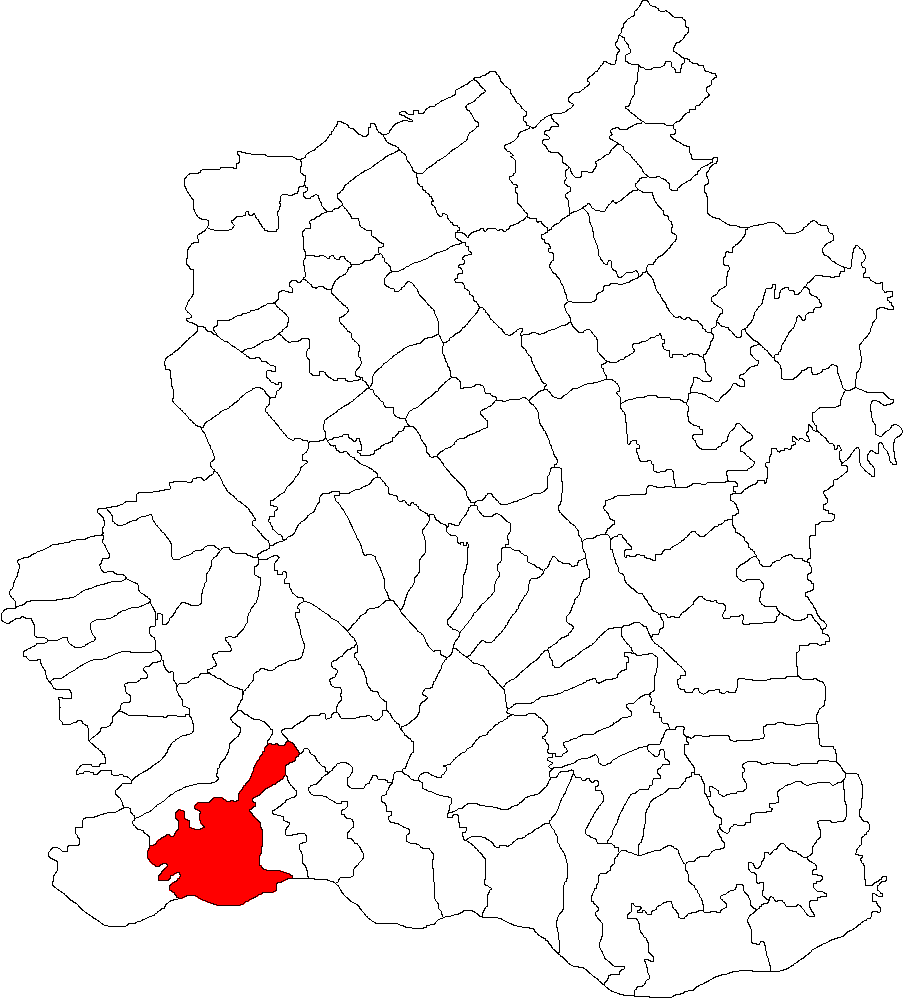
- Location in Teleorman County

- Location in Romania
- Coordinates: 43°45′6″N 24°52′15″E
- Country: Romania
- County: Teleorman
- Established: 1394 (first attested)

Government
  - Mayor (2024–2028): Dănuț Cuclea (PSD)
- Area: 107.20 km^{2} (41.39 sq mi)
- Elevation: 31 m (102 ft)
- Population (2021-12-01): 19,597
  - Density: 182.81/km^{2} (473.47/sq mi)
- Time zone: UTC+02:00 (EET)
  - Summer (DST): UTC+03:00 (EEST)
- Postal code: 145200
- Area code: (+40) 02 47
- Vehicle reg.: TR
- Website: www.municipiulturnumagurele.ro

Turnu Măgurele (Romanian pronunciation: [ˌturnu məɡuˈrele]) is a city in Teleorman County, Romania, in the historical region of Muntenia. Developed nearby the site once occupied by the medieval port of Turnu, it is situated north-east of the confluence between the Olt River and the Danube, at the edge of the Wallachian Plain.

The first documentary attestation of the town appears in a diploma issued by Sigismund of Luxembourg, King of Hungary, on the occasion of the battles fought here in 1394. The fortress belonged to the Ottoman Empire, intermittently, between 1417 and 1829, being a Turkish raya. During the Iancu Jianu's hajduk raids against the Vidin pasha Osman Pazvantoğlu, the fortress was burned and destroyed. After the Russo-Turkish War of 1828–1829, the town became part of Wallachia, as a result of the Treaty of Adrianople. After 1829, the locality was relocated on a nearby hill, near the localities of Odaia and Măgurele, and the fortress was demolished. Turnu Măgurele was the residence of Teleorman County from 1839 to 1950, and once again from 1952 until 1968, when, following Romania's administrative reorganization of that year, it lost the status of county residence in favor of the city of Alexandria.

The communist urban systematization had a major impact on the town's urban planning and the establishment of the Chemical Fertilizer Plant (1962) transformed the city into an industrial one. Forced urbanization caused the city's population to grow substantially to reach almost 37,000 in 1992.

After the 1989 Revolution, the municipality suffered a sharp decline as a result of the collapse of industrial and economic activities and the migration of the population to the larger cities as well as to other European states.

== Geography ==
A ferry plies across the Danube to the Bulgarian city of Nikopol. There are some vestiges of a Roman bridge across the Danube, built in 330 by Constantine the Great. It is built in the Danube plain in a fertile land called the Burnaz Plain. At 4 km (2.5 mi) south-west from it the river Olt joins the Danube. Its medium altitude is 31 m (102 ft) above sea level.

=== Climate ===
The climate in Turnu Măgurele is characteristic of southern Romania, specifically a temperate-continental climate with sub-Mediterranean influences. Four distinct seasons are present: winter, spring, summer, and autumn. Winters in Turnu Măgurele are milder compared to the rest of the country, due to its low-lying geographical position and the influence of warm air masses from the south. However, summers are extremely hot (with very high temperatures frequently exceeding 35°C and occasionally reaching the 40°C threshold) and with very low precipitation. The city is recognized as one of Romania's hottest areas. In general, temperature variations are significant, with the city frequently recording national temperature records during the summer, while winter is marked by fewer days of snow cover compared to areas in the north of the country.

The hottest temperature ever recorded in Turnu Măgurele is 43.4°C on July 24, 2007, while the coldest is −32.3°C on January 15, 1893.

Climate data for Turnu Măgurele
| Month | Jan | Feb | Mar | Apr | May | Jun | Jul | Aug | Sep | Oct | Nov | Dec | Year |
|---|---|---|---|---|---|---|---|---|---|---|---|---|---|
| Record high °C (°F) | 22.5 (72.5) | 24.1 (75.4) | 29.6 (85.3) | 34.2 (93.6) | 38.8 (101.8) | 41.6 (106.9) | 43.4 (110.1) | 40.8 (105.4) | 40.0 (104.0) | 36.4 (97.5) | 26.9 (80.4) | 22.0 (71.6) | 43.4 (110.1) |
| Mean daily maximum °C (°F) | 5.1 (41.2) | 8.8 (47.8) | 13.7 (56.7) | 19.6 (67.3) | 20.3 (68.5) | 29.9 (85.8) | 32.6 (90.7) | 32.8 (91.0) | 27.5 (81.5) | 19.8 (67.6) | 11.6 (52.9) | 6.7 (44.1) | 19.2 (66.6) |
| Daily mean °C (°F) | 1.0 (33.8) | 4.0 (39.2) | 8.1 (46.6) | 12.9 (55.2) | 13.9 (57.0) | 23.0 (73.4) | 25.4 (77.7) | 25.3 (77.5) | 20.5 (68.9) | 13.6 (56.5) | 7.7 (45.9) | 3.3 (37.9) | 13.4 (56.1) |
| Mean daily minimum °C (°F) | −3.1 (26.4) | −0.8 (30.6) | 2.4 (36.3) | 6.3 (43.3) | 7.6 (45.7) | 16.2 (61.2) | 18.1 (64.6) | 17.9 (64.2) | 13.5 (56.3) | 7.4 (45.3) | 3.8 (38.8) | −0.1 (31.8) | 7.7 (45.9) |
| Record low °C (°F) | −30.0 (−22.0) | −26.0 (−14.8) | −22.2 (−8.0) | −4.6 (23.7) | 0.5 (32.9) | 5.0 (41.0) | 9.0 (48.2) | 6.6 (43.9) | −2.5 (27.5) | −5.8 (21.6) | −18.2 (−0.8) | −25.0 (−13.0) | −32.3 (−26.1) |
| Average precipitation mm (inches) | 41.6 (1.64) | 29.4 (1.16) | 49.4 (1.94) | 35.9 (1.41) | 60.9 (2.40) | 69.1 (2.72) | 43.7 (1.72) | 30.4 (1.20) | 37.6 (1.48) | 66.1 (2.60) | 57.9 (2.28) | 50.8 (2.00) | 592.0 (23.31) |
| Average precipitation days | 6.7 | 5.2 | 7.5 | 5.3 | 7.9 | 7.2 | 4.6 | 3.6 | 4.1 | 5.2 | 7.9 | 6.2 | 71.4 |
Source: meteomanz.com

== History ==
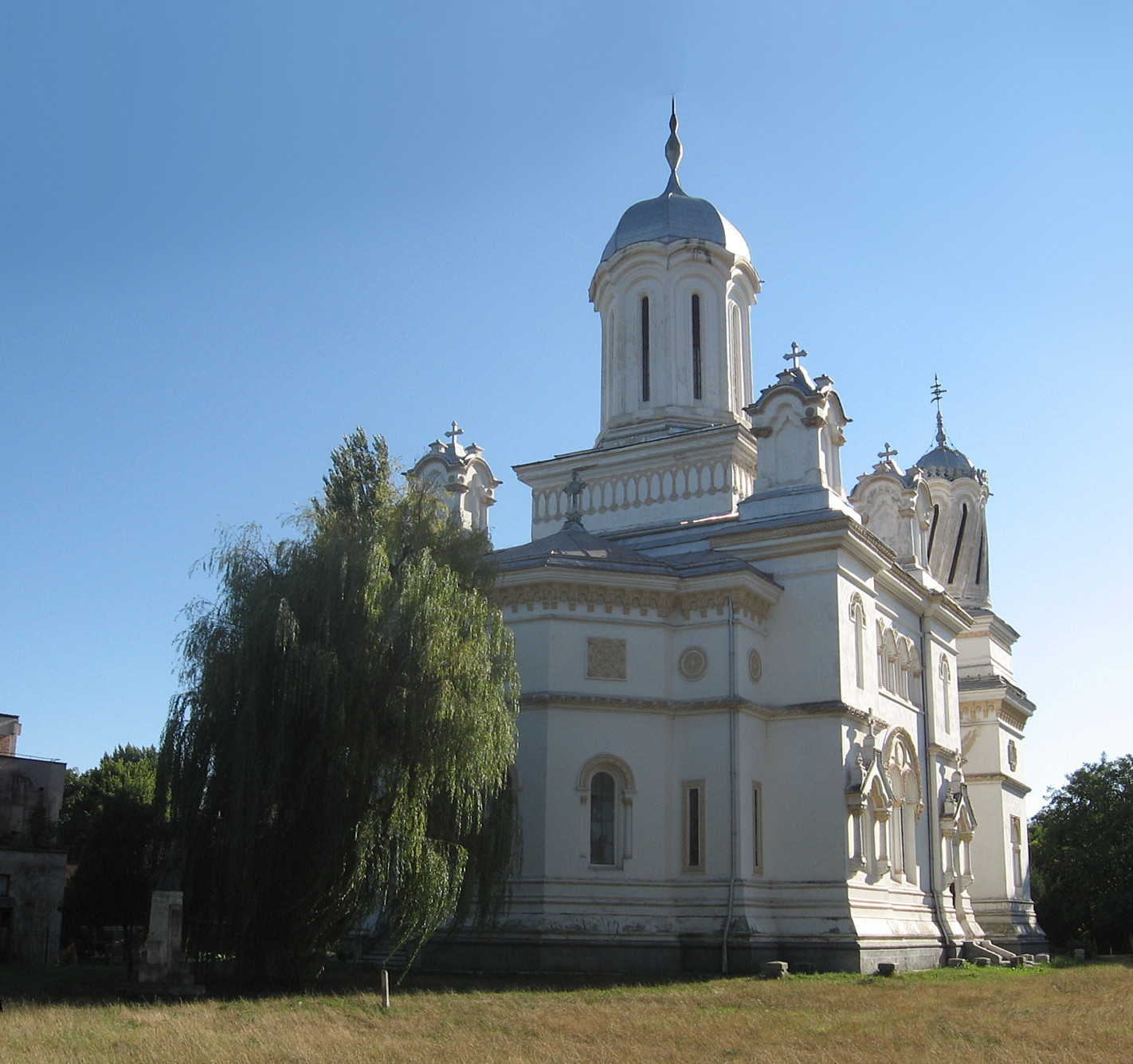
Romanian Orthodox cathedral of Saint Haralambios

After the Daco-Roman wars of 101–106 AD, ended by the victory of the Roman armies led by Emperor Trajan and the conquest of Dacia. Emperor Trajan fortified the eastern border of Dacia on the Olt line, building the famous Limes Alutanus, consisting of fortresses and fortresses on either side of the Olt River, from the Danube to the Boița Mountains. Procopius of Caesarea, during the time of Justinian the Great, recalls the city of Turris and points to Trajan as its founder. Some historians identify the fortress with the one discovered at Turnu Măgurele. This assertion is not confirmed; according to archaeological research, the Turnu Fortress dates from a later period. Historians and archaeologists have not yet agreed on when the construction of the Danube fortification began: there are theories about a construction from the time of Constantine the Great or even later, from the time of Justinian I, but none of them is fully accepted by historians. What is certain is that during the reign of Mircea the Elder, this settlement played an important role in the defensive strategy of Wallachia in the face of the Ottoman danger.

The first documentary attestation of the fortress of Turnu appears between the years 1393–1395 in a document (from 1397) of the chancellery of Sigismund of Luxembourg. The document describes the context and history of Sigismund's struggles in support of Mircea the Elder, his vassal, to return to the throne of Wallachia. In this diploma it is mentioned the recapture of the fortress by the troops allied to Mircea:

"After our accession to (Wallachia), we flew the Romanians and the Turks with their captains and took the blood of the Nicopolis minor fortress, located in Wallachia, with great bloodshed"

The fortress will remain under the rule of Wallachia during the reign of Mircea until around 1417, when Turnu came under Turkish rule and was transformed, together with a security zone (established in the depths of Wallachian territory with a radius of 15 km from the fortress), into Turnu raya. The Ottomans ruled Turnu (Kule in Turkish, Holavnik in Bulgarian) with some intermittencies (between 1462, 1594–1600, and 1772–1774), during the anti-Ottoman rebellions of Vlad III the Impaler and Michael the Brave, until 1826, when it was ceded to Wallachia through the 1826 Akkerman Convention, along with Giurgiu and Brăila. In 1829, following the Treaty of Adrianople the Turnu, Giurgiu, and Brăila rayas were definitively ceded to Wallachia. The fortress was severely damaged and burned by Iancu Jianu's hajduks in their campaign (1809) against Osman Pazvantoğlu and was never rebuilt under Turkish rule. After the town finally became part of the Wallachia it was moved to the nearby hill and renamed Turnu Măgurele (măgurele meaning hillock in Romanian). By a decree issued by Alexandru Dimitrie Ghica, the Prince of Wallachia the town was refounded on February 27, 1836.

Towards the end of World War II, the city served as an unlikely submarine base, as Romania's two modern submarines, Rechinul and Marsuinul, took refuge in the city's port following the Soviet aerial bombardment of Constanța on August 20, 1944.

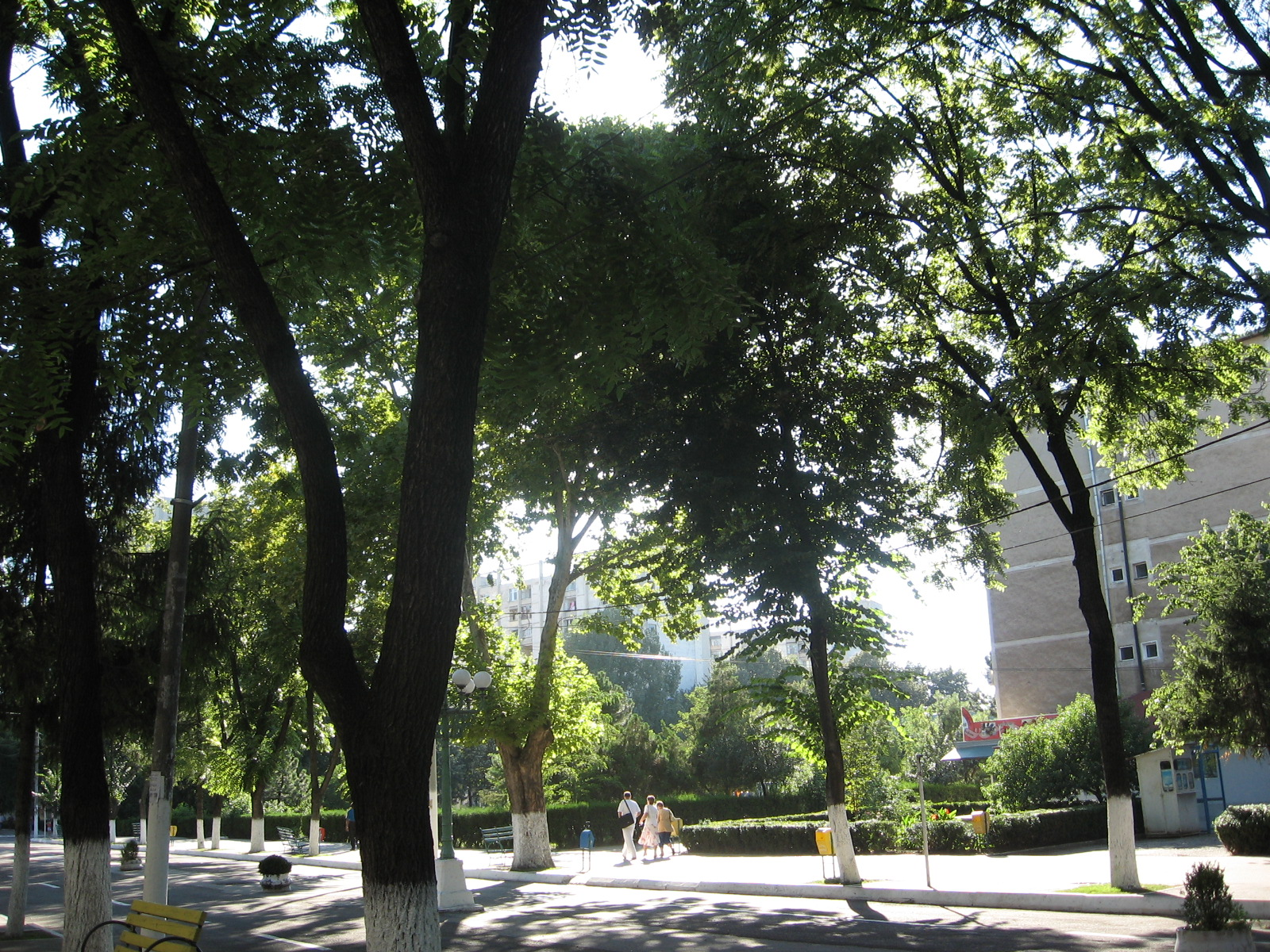
Avenue in Turnu Măgurele

The village of Islaz, near Turnu Măgurele, was the initial center of the 1848 Wallachian Revolution (see Proclamation of Islaz). During the Romanian War of Independence, the town served as a base for the campaign in Bulgaria. After the administrative reform of 1968, it became a municipality. Starting with the 1960s, new apartment blocks were built in the town, however, in smaller numbers as compared to other towns and cities in the country. The newest neighborhood in the town is the Taberei housing estate, nicknamed among the locals as "Katanga", because it was built at the same time as the Katanga conflict in Congo.

Historical population
| Year | Pop. | ±% |
|---|---|---|
| 1900 | 8,668 | — |
| 1912 | 10,169 | +17.3% |
| 1930 | 16,950 | +66.7% |
| 1948 | 11,493 | −32.2% |
| 1956 | 18,055 | +57.1% |
| 1966 | 26,409 | +46.3% |
| 1977 | 32,341 | +22.5% |
| 1992 | 36,966 | +14.3% |
| 2002 | 30,187 | −18.3% |
| 2011 | 22,268 | −26.2% |
| 2021 | 19,597 | −12.0% |
Source: Census data

=== Jewish history of the town ===
In the 19th century, a small Jewish community, which included both Ashkenazi and Sephardic Jews, existed in Turnu Măgurele. A synagogue for both communities was built in 1884, and it was still active in 1939. After the establishment of the communist regime in Romania, most of the local Jews left for Israel and other countries. While the synagogue was demolished during the communist rule, the Jewish cemetery still exists.

== Natives ==
- Marian Baban (born 1976), sprint canoer
- George Bălan (1929–2022), musicologist and philosopher
- Elie Cristo-Loveanu (1893–1964), artist and educator
- Vali Ionescu (born 1960), long jumper
- Ion Negulescu (1887–1949), general and Minister of War (1944–1945)
- David Praporgescu (1865–1916), brigadier general, killed in action in World War I
- Ionuț Tîrnăcop (born 1987), football player
- Nicole Valéry Grossu (1919–1996), writer, journalist, and anti-communist activist

== Tourist attractions ==
The major tourist attraction is Saint Haralambios Cathedral in the center of the town. Built by Greek farmers at the beginning of the 20th century, the cathedral is based on the plans of the Curtea de Argeș Cathedral and constructed in a late renaissance style. Another city landmark is the independence monument, which was built in celebration of the major role that Turnu Măgurele played in the Romanian War of Independence of 1877–1878.

== Economy ==
A chemical and textile industry center in the past, the city has more recently been diversifying its economy, with enterprises such as ElectroTurris (an electrical engine factory), and ConservTurris (a food processing plant).

The chemical plant is notorious for the air pollution it generates (issued gases contain ammonia and hydrogen sulfide, at times above current norms), and it quite possibly does not meet the EU ecological (air pollution) requirements.
