= Țara Făgărașului =

Historical region in central Romania

Țara Făgărașului Țara Făgărașului (Romanian) Цара Фъгърашȣлȣй (Romanian Cyrillic)
- 14th century
- Țara Făgărașului during the time of Mircea the Elder
- Capital: Făgăraș
- Common languages: Romanian; German; Hungarian
- Historical era: Middle Ages
- Today part of: Romania

Țara Făgărașului (also Romanian: Țara Oltului; German: Fogaraschland or Fogarascherland, Hungarian: Fogarasföld, Latin: terra Fugaras or terra Alutus) is a historical region in central Romania, located in the southern part of Transylvania. It is named after the Făgăraș Mountains, which dominate the landscape of the area.

The region, which comprises parts of Brașov and Sibiu counties, is bordered to the north by the Olt River, and to the south by the Făgăraș Mountains, with its historical center in the Făgăraș Citadel.

== History ==
In the Middle Ages, the area was part of the Kingdom of Hungary. In the 14th century, the area was given to the Basarab family, who founded the Principality of Wallachia. The area became part of the Principality of Transylvania in the 16th century, which was ruled by the Habsburgs since the 18th century.

During the Habsburg era, the area became a district of Transylvania and was governed by royal officials appointed by the emperor. The region played an important role in the economy of the Habsburg Empire, as it was strategically located on the trade route between Wallachia and Hungary.

In the 19th century, the process of modernization and industrialization that took place in Transylvania brought about great changes to the region. The area became a center of textile production, and many mills and mills were established in the area. The area was also known for its rich agriculture, including fruit and vegetable production, animal husbandry, and forestry.

Today Țara Făgărașului is a popular tourist destination, known for its natural beauty and cultural heritage. The Făgăraș Mountains are a popular destination for hikers and climbers, and the region is home to numerous historical attractions, including medieval castles and fortified churches. The area is also known for traditional crafts such as pottery, wood carving, and weaving, as well as its culinary customs.

== See also ==
- Banate of Severin
- Țara Amlașului
