= Țara Amlașului =

Possession of the voivodes of Wallachia

Map showing Țara Amlașului to the left and the much bigger Țara Făgărașului to the right

Țara Amlașului (also Țara Amnașului; Hungarian: omlási hűbérbirtok; German: Hamlescher Lehen) was a possession of the voivodes of Wallachia in Transylvania, then part of the Kingdom of Hungary. Wallachian voivodes are first attested as possessing part of the villages of Țara Amlașului in 1366 during Vladislav I's reign, and their possession of the whole territory lasted until 1467, when it was expropriated by Hungary.

== History ==
In 1366, the Romanian voivode of Wallachia and King Louis I of Hungary reconciled. Vladislav I, Voivode of Wallachia (voivoda noster transalpinus, "our Wallachian voivode") received the Fogaras and Omlás estates as well the Banate of Szörény as a fief. His possession of fiefs in Hungary changed the relationship between the king and the voivode, and Vladislav entered the ranks of high-ranking Hungarian officials, magnates and barons.

Țara Amlașului was located in the south of Transylvania, in the area of the Cindrel and Lotru mountains and the lowlands to the north. It comprised several Romanian and Saxon villages: Aciliu, Amlaș (the area's center, now called Amnaș), Cacova (now Fântânele), Galeș, Săliște, Sibiel, Tilișca and Vale.

Țara Amlașului was included in Mircea the Elder's lengthy title mentioning all the possessions over which he held control. The title described him as the herțeg or duke of the territory. Mircea governed Wallachia from 1386 to 1395 and again from 1397 to 1418, having had one of the longest reigns in Romanian history. Under him, Wallachia reached its maximum territorial extension.

== See also ==
- Banate of Severin
- Țara Făgărașului
