= Turnu Măgurele Courthouse =

Courthouse in Romania

Coordinates: 43.7455°N 24.8661°E

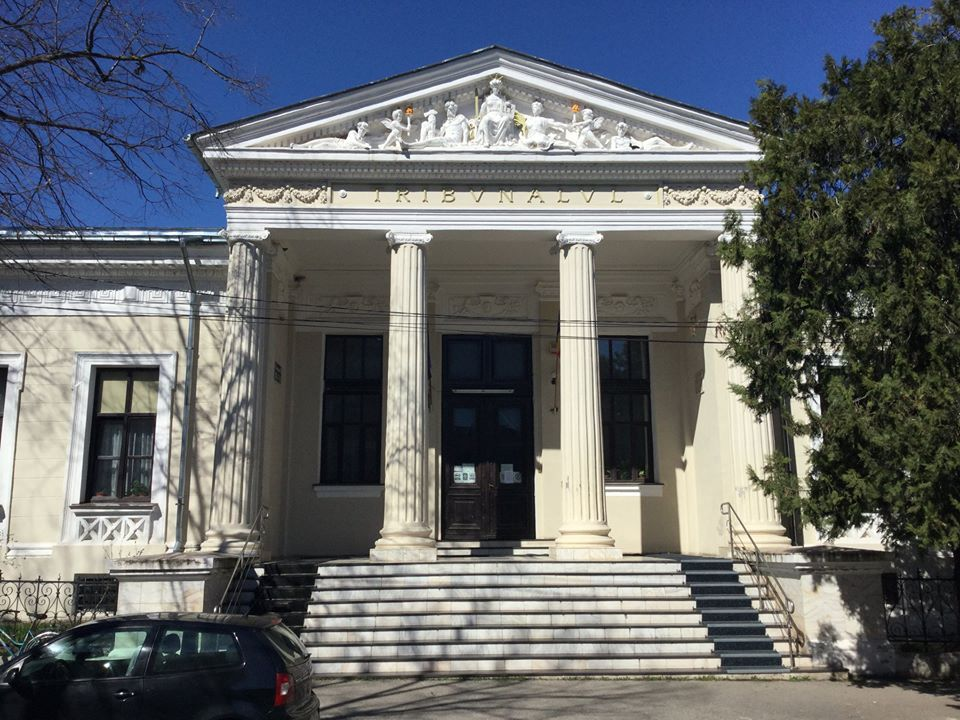
Turnu Măgurele Courthouse

The Turnu Măgurele Courthouse (Romanian: Judecătoria Turnu Măgurele) is a judicial building located at 1 Decembrie 1918 Street, nr. 6, in Turnu Măgurele, Romania.

Work on the courthouse began in 1903, at a time when Turnu Măgurele was the seat of Teleorman County. The builders were Italian, and they finished in 1914. Another wing was added in 1923, and the structure underwent a thorough renovation in 1997.

The facade is in neoclassical style, the columns and frieze recalling the Parthenon, the staircase imposing. The lobby is rectangular, with hallways leading to rooms in each direction, and a skylight on the roof. There is a basement, ground and upper floor, and three courtrooms. The prosecutor's office was located on the upper floor until 2002, when it moved into a new headquarters.

After 1950, when the new communist regime did away with the counties of Romania, the court served a much smaller area. In 1968, when the counties were revived, the seat and with it the county court moved to Alexandria. Thus, the building was downgraded to a district courthouse.

The courthouse is listed as a historic monument by Romania's Ministry of Culture and Religious Affairs.
