= Ion Negulescu =

Romanian general and Minister of War (1887–1949)

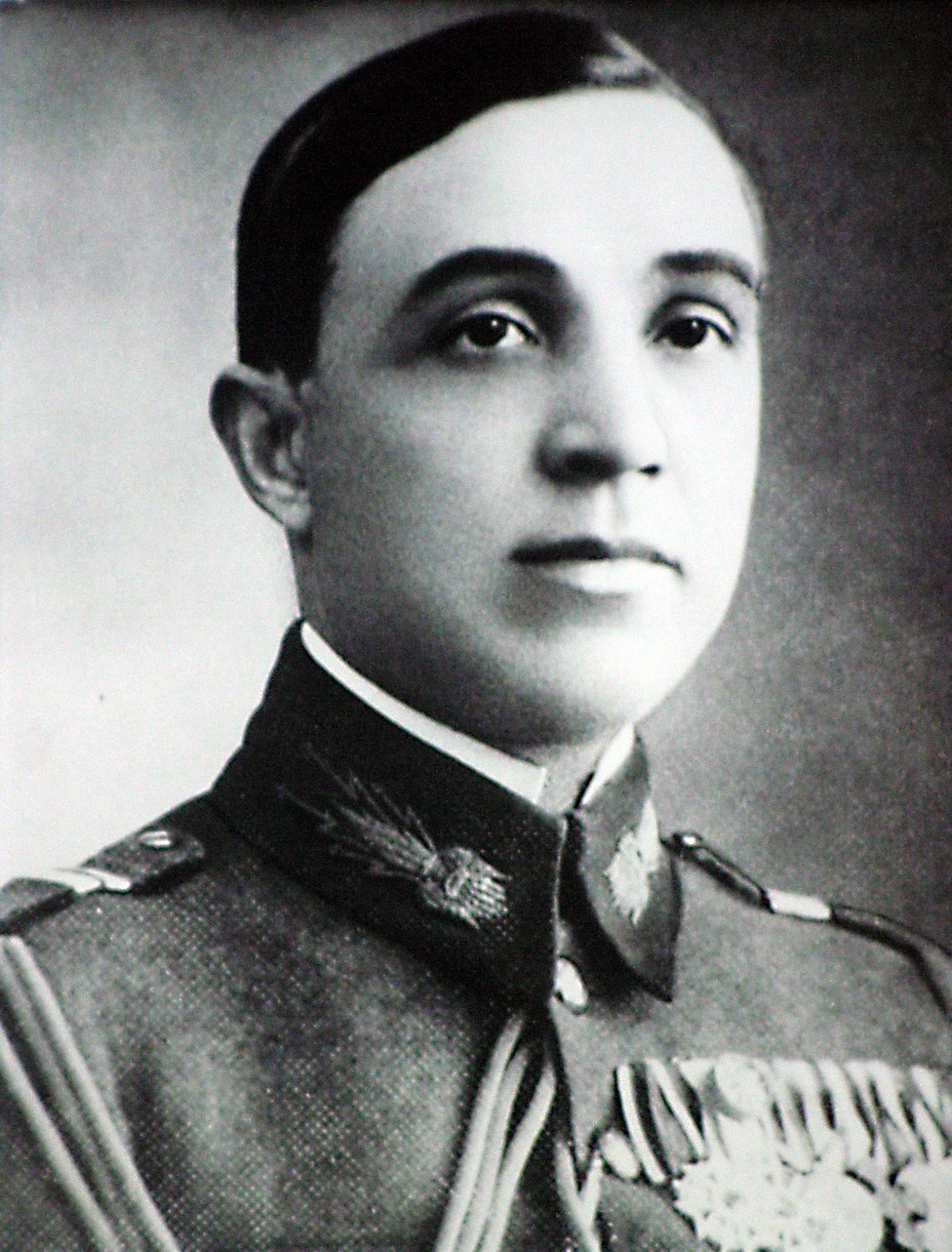

Minister of War
- In office 6 December 1944 – 28 March 1945
- Prime Minister: Nicolae Rădescu
- Preceded by: Constantin Sănătescu
- Succeeded by: Constantin Vasiliu-Rășcanu

Personal details
- Born: April 1, 1887 Turnu Măgurele, Kingdom of Romania
- Died: April 1, 1949 (aged 62) Jilava Prison, Romanian People's Republic
- Awards: Order of the Star of Romania, Commander class

Military service
- Allegiance: Kingdom of Romania
- Rank: Lieutenant General
- Battles/wars: World War I World War II

Ion Negulescu (born April 1, 1887, Turnu Măgurele – April 1, 1949, Jilava Prison) was a Romanian general, who served as Minister of War in the government of Nicolae Rădescu from December 6, 1944, to February 28, 1945).

== Biography ==
Negulescu was born on April 1, 1887, in the town of Turnu Măgurele. After completing military school, he became second lieutenant in 1908, lieutenant in 1911, and captain in 1916. He participated in World War I, commanding a heavy artillery battery, and being promoted to major in 1917. After the war, he advanced in rank to lieutenant colonel in 1923, colonel in 1929, and brigadier general in 1937. In 1929, he served as military attaché to Germany.

He was promoted to the rank of major general effective June 8, 1940. On July 18, 1942, he was promoted to lieutenant general.

Between June 4, 1941, and December 6, 1944, Negulescu was the commander of the Border Guard Corps. He defended Bukovina villages from the looting, rape and destruction of Soviet soldiers and encouraged the resistance movement in the area.

He then served as Minister of War in the government led by General Nicolae Rădescu (December 6, 1944 – February 28, 1945).

After the installation of the government of Petru Groza, Ioan Negulescu who held the rank of army corps general was ex-officio transferred to the reserve position, along with other generals, by decree no. 860 of March 24, 1945, citing law no. 166, adopted by decree no. 768 of March 19, 1945, for "the transfer from office to reserve of active army personnel who are surplus to the needs of staffing".

He was arrested on December 29, 1948, being accused of belonging to the National Resistance Movement, an anti-communist organization. He died in the Jilava Prison on April 1, 1949.

In 1940, he was awarded the Order of the Star of Romania, Commander class.
