= Lesencetomaj =

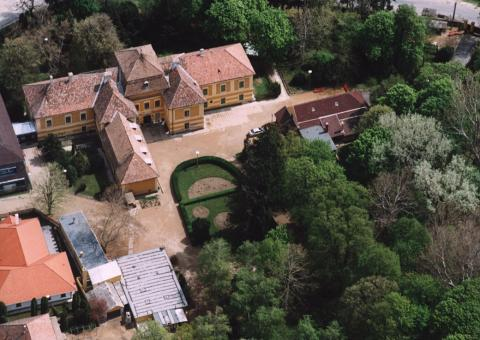

- Flag Coat of arms

- Location of Lesencetomaj in Hungary
- Coordinates: 46.8566°N 17.3684°E
- Country: Hungary
- Region: Central Transdanubia
- County: Veszprém

Area
  - Total: 24.08 km^{2} (9.30 sq mi)

Population (2012)
  - Total: 1,084
  - Density: 45.02/km^{2} (116.6/sq mi)
- Time zone: UTC+1 (CET)
  - Summer (DST): UTC+2 (CEST)
- Postal code: 8318
- Area code: +36 87
- Website: https://lesencetomaj.hu/

Lesencetomaj is a village in Veszprém county, Hungary.

== See also ==
- Maria Tolmay
