= George Bălan =

Romanian musicologist (1929–2022)

- Born: 11 March 1929; Turnu Măgurele, Teleorman, Romania
- Died: 3 January 2022 (aged 92); Freiburg im Breisgau, Baden-Württemberg, Germany
- Occupation: musicologist

George Bălan (11 March 1929 – 3 January 2022) was a Romanian musicologist, philosopher and aphorist.

== Life and career ==
Born in Turnu Măgurele, Bălan graduated at the Ciprian Porumbescu Conservatory and got his doctorate in musical aesthetics at the Lomonosov University. In 1951 he became musical editor at the Contimporanul magazine in Bucharest; a role he maintained through 1957 and later returned to from 1961 through 1963.

From 1955 through 1975 Bălan taught on the faculty of the National University of Music Bucharest. He was then professor in his alma mater and at the Lucian Blaga University of Sibiu from 1975 through 1977. In 1977 he moved to Munich in Bavaria, West Germany, where he converted to Catholicism and publicly attacked on various occasions the Romanian communist ruling.

Bălan is best known as the developer of musicosophia, a musical aesthetic theory and method based on creative music listening. In 1979 he founded a Musicosophia International School in Southern Bavaria. He died from COVID-19 on 3 January 2022, at the age of 92.

== Publications ==
- Muzica, artă greu de înţeles?, Editura Muzicală a Uniunii Compozitorilor şi Muzicologilor din România, Bucureşti, 1955–1956-1960.
- Der philosophische Gehalt der Musik, Dissertation, Moskau, 1961.
- Enescu - mesajul, estetica, Editura Muzicală a Uniunii Compozitorilor şi Muzicologilor din România, Bucureşti, 1959–1960.
- Enescu - viaţa, Editura Muzicală a Uniunii Compozitorilor şi Muzicologilor din România, Bucureşti, 1962.
- Gustav Mahler, Editura Muzicală a Uniunii Compozitorilor şi Muzicologilor din România, Bucureşti, 1962.
- Tragicul, Bucureşti, 1961–1962.
- Muzica, temă de meditaţie filosofică, Editura Ştiinţifică, Bucureşti, 1955–1956, 1960.
- Sensurile muzicii, Editura Tineretului, Bucureşti, 1965.
- Innoirile muzicii, Editura Muzicală a Uniunii Compozitorilor şi Muzicologilor din România, Bucureşti, 1966.
- Eu, Richard Wagner, Editura Tineretului, Bucureşti, 1966.
- Dincolo de muzică, Editura pentru Literatură, Bucureşti, 1967.
- Întrebările conştiinţei wagneriene, Editura Muzicală a Uniunii Compozitorilor şi Muzicologilor din România, Bucureşti, 1968.
- În dialog cu Emil Cioran, Editura Cartea Românească, Bucureşti, 1968–1969, 1996.
- Noi ṣi clasicii, Editura Tineretului, Bucureşti, 1968.
- Venirea antimuzicii, Editura Muzicală a Uniunii Compozitorilor şi Muzicologilor din România, Bucureşti, 1968.
- Procesul lui Socrate, Editura Albatros, Bucureşti, 1968–1969, 1993.
- În căutarea Maestrului, Editura Institutul European, Bucureşti, 1968–1972, 1999.
- Pelerinaj oriental, Bucureşti, 1965.
- Le sens de la musique, Bucureşti, 1965.
- Arta de a înţelege muzica, Editura Muzicală a Uniunii Compozitorilor şi Muzicologilor din România, Bucureşti, 1970.
- Meditaţii beethoveniene, Editura Albatros, Bucureşti, 1969–1970.
- Via meditativa, Editura Eminescu, Bucureşti, 1972–1974, 1997.
- Cazul Schönberg, Editura Muzicală a Uniunii Compozitorilor şi Muzicologilor din România, Bucureşti, 1974.
- Iniţiere muzicală, Bucureşti, 1974.
- Pneumatologie-Morţii noştri, Bucureşti, 1973–1974.
- Mică filosofie a muzicii, Editura Eminescu, Bucureşti, 1975.
- Nebănuitul Eminescu, Editura Universal Dalsi, Bucureşti, 1975, 1984, 1999.
- O istorie a muzicii europene, Editura Albatros, Bucureşti, 1975.
- Die geistige Botschaft der Musik, St. Peter, 1986
