= Vlad I of Wallachia =

Vlad I "the Usurper" Vlad I "Uzurpatorul" (Romanian)
- Voivode of Wallachia

Voivode of Wallachia
- Reign: 1395–1396/1397
- Predecessor: Mircea I
- Successor: Mircea I
- Died: December 1396 or January 1397

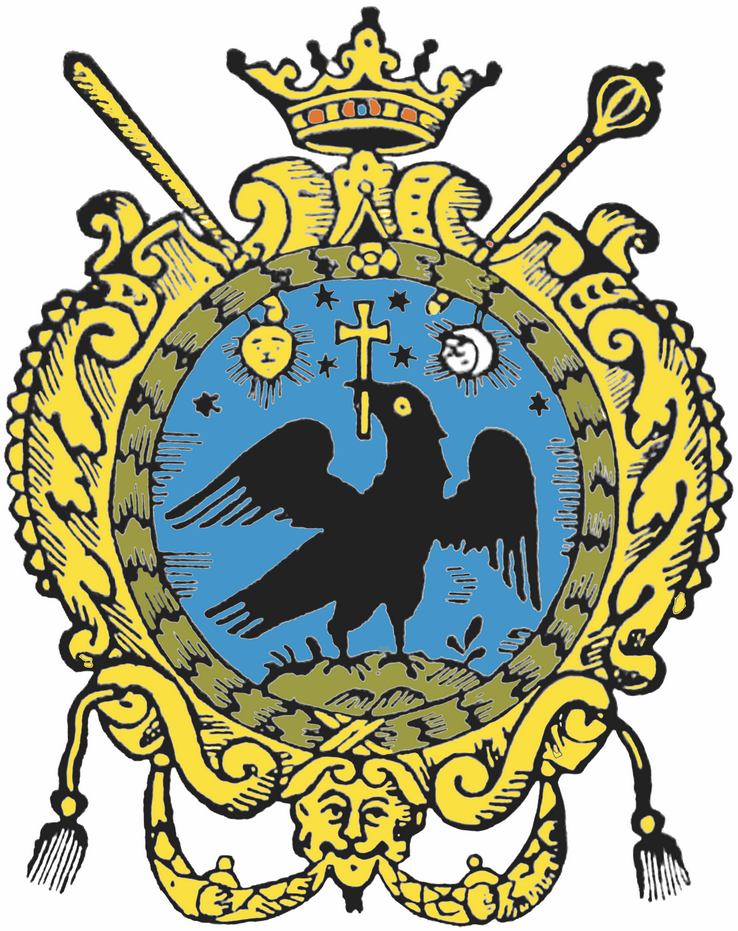

Vlad I (? – 1396/97?) known as Uzurpatorul (the Usurper), was a ruler of Wallachia in what later became Romania. He usurped the throne from Mircea I of Wallachia. His rule lasted barely three years, from October/November 1394 to January 1397, while others suggest that the accurate ruling period was from May 1395 to December 1396.

== Early life ==
There are disagreements about Vlad I's origins. He was either a nobleman or the son of Dan I and brother of Dan II. Other scholars have reservations about establishing any degree of kinship between Vlad I and Mircea the Elder due to the lack of supporting documents.

== Reign ==
Vlad I of Wallachia supposedly took the throne after the great Ottoman offensive in the fall of 1394, during the Battle of Rovine (dated by several Serbian chronicles to 10 October 1394). However, according to Serbian historian Radoslav Radojičić, Vlad I actually took the throne on 17 May 1395. This theory has been accepted by Romanian historians such as Anca Iancu. At the end of 1395, Sigismund of Luxembourg mentioned that Vlad I was sovereign of Wallachia, referring to his pro-Ottoman policy. In a document dated 28 May 1396 (Hurmuzaki, I / 2, pp. 374–375), Vlad Voievod gives special privileges to the Polish kingdom, confirming that he had contact with the Polish king.

Vlad I removed Wallachia from the anti-Ottoman coalition, leading to his official non-recognition by the Hungarian kingdom and its allies. However, the treaty with Poland made through the Moldovan prince Stephen I indicates that Vlad remained a powerful ruler in his country. This position is confirmed by the coins that were issued. Struggles to remove him from the throne and return Wallachia to the coalition continued throughout his reign, though when the expedition of Stephen of Lozoncs in May 1395 ended in a military disaster, the Hungarian king said that "Walachia was lost and the Danube fell into the hand of the enemy" (Victor Motogna, Foreign Policy of Mircea the Elder, Gherla, 1924, p. 42).

In July 1395, a Hungarian expedition led by Sigismund, probably seconded by Mircea the Elder, captured the Turnu fortress and left a garrison loyal to the king. Throughout the following year the struggles to remove Vlad I continued. These were interrupted only by the participation of Sigismund and his vassals, including Mircea the Elder, in the campaign which resulted in defeat at the Nicopole. During this expedition, the territory of Wallachia was bypassed in order to avoid the Wallachian and Ottoman military forces stationed there. After the defeat, those who tried to find their way across the Danube were either ransomed or executed. This reaction from the Wallachian voivode can be attributed to the massacres by the Crusaders of Bulgarian Orthodox Christians in the conquered cities.

In October 1396, another military expedition headed by Stibor, the Transylvanian voivode, led to the defeat and capture of Vlad, who died in captivity. This allowed Mircea the Elder to regain the throne in January 1397.

== Controversy ==
In establishing the paternity of Vlad I, PP Panaitescu starts from an account by the Hungarian chronicler Johannes de Thurocz (1435 – 1488 or 1489), which speaks of a struggle between Dan, supported by the Turks, and Mircea, supported by King Sigismund. The chronicle mentions that both were of the same blood. Taking into account the theory of Bogdan Petriceicu Hasdeu, according to which the struggle described was carried out between Dan I and Mircea in 1386, Panaitescu rejects the assumption of C. Litzica that a battle between Michael I and Dan II took place in 1420, and describes the account as a mistake by Thurocz, confusing Vlad with Dan, and not Mihail with Mircea. He explains that the source of Thurocz's confusion was that Vlad I was the son of Dan I.

Gh. Bratianu shares Panaitescu's theory. Al. V. Diţă describes the episode from Thurócz's chronicle as a "nebulous narrative", "an imaginary conflict reminiscent of the theme of 'enemy brothers' in folklore" and "fantasy without a historical theme".

== Notes ==
Vlad I of Wallachia Unknown
Regnal titles
Preceded by Mircea I	Voivode of Wallachia c. 1394/1395-1397	Succeeded by Mircea I
