= Maria Tolmay =

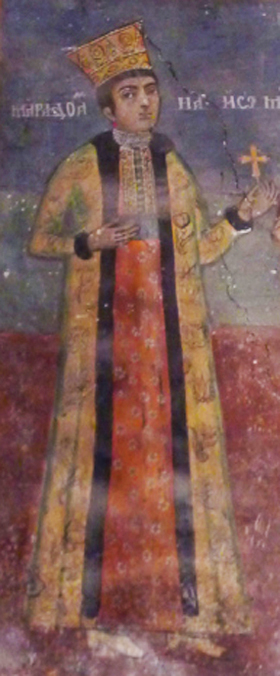
- Died: 1420 or 1427
- Spouse: Mircea I of Wallachia
- Issue: Michael I of Wallachia

Maria Tolmay or Mara (died in 1420 or 1427) was the wife of Mircea I of Wallachia. She was the mother of his only legitimate son and co-ruler, Michael. She was born to an unidentified Hungarian noble family and owned present-day Lesencetomaj at Lake Balaton in the Kingdom of Hungary in the early 15th century.

== Family ==
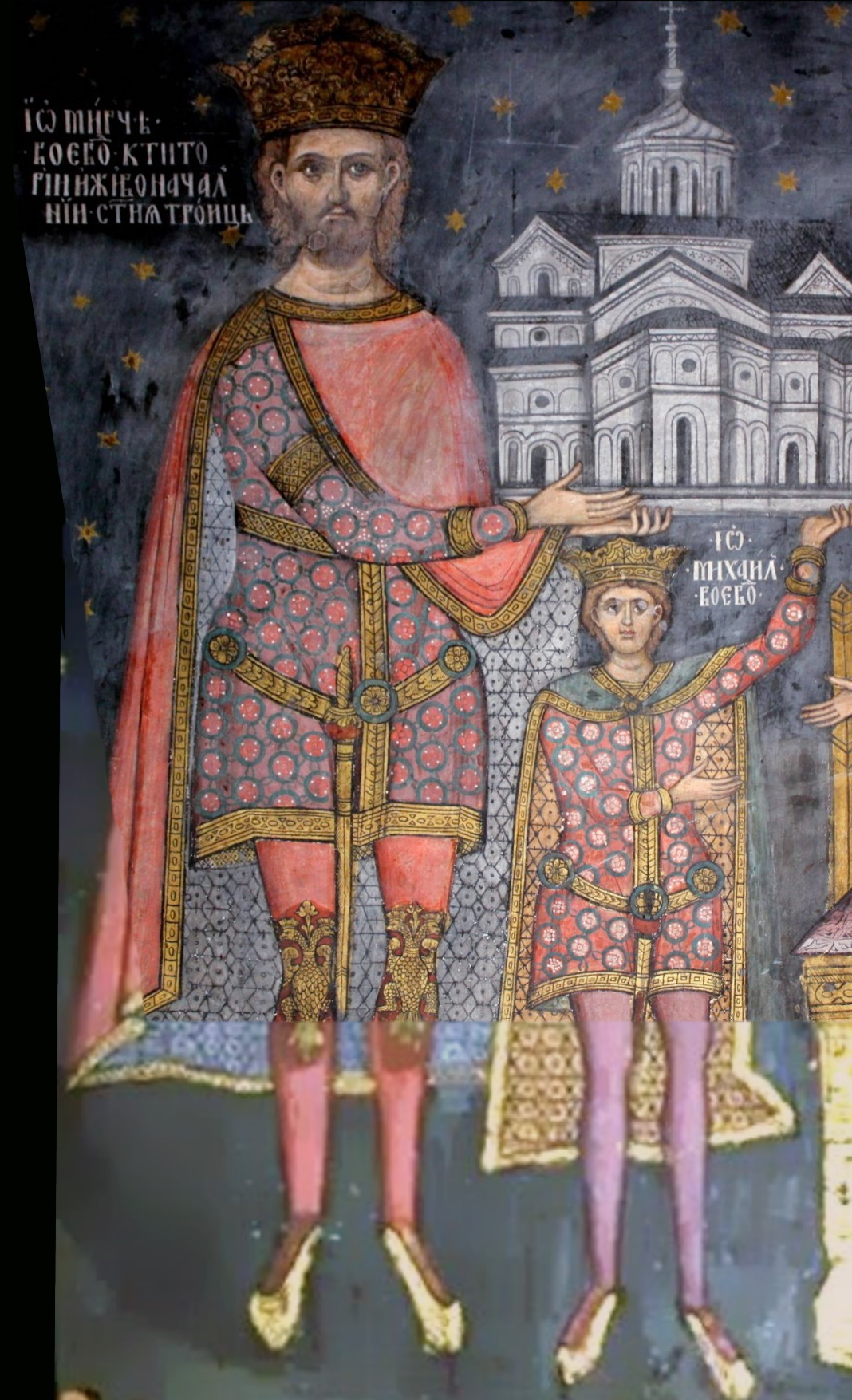
Maria's husband, Mircea I of Wallachia, and their son, Michael I of Wallachia, depicted on an 18th-century icon in the Cozia Monastery

Her baptismal name has traditionally been reconstructed as Mara. However, only its last two letters (..RA) have been preserved by an inscription of a picture painted in 1761. Constantin Gane proposed that she was a member of the House of Basarab, stating that she was the first cousin of her husband, Mircea I of Wallachia, for which they could only marry with a special permission issued by the Archbishop of Ohrid. The source of Gane's theory cannot be identified. Historians Petre P. Panaitescu, Constantin Rezachevici and Radu Florescu stated that she was closely related to the Counts of Celje.

According to historian Mihai Florin Hasan, neither her baptismal name nor her family can certainly be identified. Her baptismal name could also be Klara, or even Anna. She owned Lesencetomaj near Lake Balaton in 1400. Consequently, she may have been related to any Hungarian noble family which had landed property in the region, including the Counts of Celje, the Szécsis, Bánffys or the nobles who owned the village of Badacsonytomaj.

== Life ==
She gave birth to the only legitimate son of Mircea I of Wallachia, Michael. Michael was first mentioned as his father's co-ruler in 1391. She certainly visited her estate on Lake Balaton in 1400. On this occasion, Sigismund of Luxembourg, King of Hungary, ordered her to respect the ancient privileges of the inhabitants of Ketzel and to stop collecting duties from them.

Panaitescu proposed that she had built a Roman Catholic church dedicated to the Holy Virgin in Târgoviște in 1417. She may have again visited Lesencetomaj in 1419, because a charter refers to her return from Hungary in that year. According to Panaitescu, she survived her husband and son, and died in 1427. Hassan proposes that she died shortly after the murder of her son during an Ottoman campaign against Wallachia in May 1420, because Lesencetomaj was listed among the villages of the royal castle of Rezi on 20 April 1421, showing that her estate had escheated to the Crown.

== Sources ==
- Florescu, Radu R.; McNally, Raymond T. (1989). Dracula, Prince of Many Faces: His Life and his Times. Back Bay Books. ISBN 978-0-316-28656-5.
- Hasan, Mihai Florin (2013). "Aspecte ale relațiilor matrimoniale munteano-maghiare din secolele XIV-XV [Aspects of the Hungarian-Wallachian matrimonial relations of the fourteenth and fifteenth centuries]". Revista Bistriţei (in Romanian). XXVII. Cumplexul Muzeal Bistrița-Năsăud: 128–159. ISSN 1222-5096.
- Treptow, Kurt W. (2000). Vlad III Dracula: The Life and Times of the Historical Dracula. The Center of Romanian Studies. ISBN 973-98392-2-3.
