= Raya (country subdivision) =

Turkish rayas in the area of the Romanian Principalities (17th-18th centuries)

Raya or raia is a term used in Romanian historiography to refer to former territories of the mediaeval principalities of Wallachia and Moldavia held under the direct administration of the Ottoman Empire, as opposed to the principalities, which kept their internal autonomy under Ottoman suzerainty. The term originated from rayah, a generic name for the non-Muslim subjects of the Ottoman Empire. Though mainly populated by Christians, a raya was ruled according to Ottoman law.

A raia consisted of an important fortress and its hinterland, which generally formed a kaza in the Ottoman administrative system. In Wallachia, the raia territories were located on the northern bank of the Danube, around the fortresses of Turnu Măgurele, Giurgiu and Brăila, while in Moldavia they were situated on the eastern border, around the fortresses of Kiliya, Akkerman, Bender and Khotin. The territories in Wallachia were transferred back to the latter in 1829 by the Treaty of Adrianople.
