= Michael I of Wallachia =

Michael I
- Voivode of Wallachia
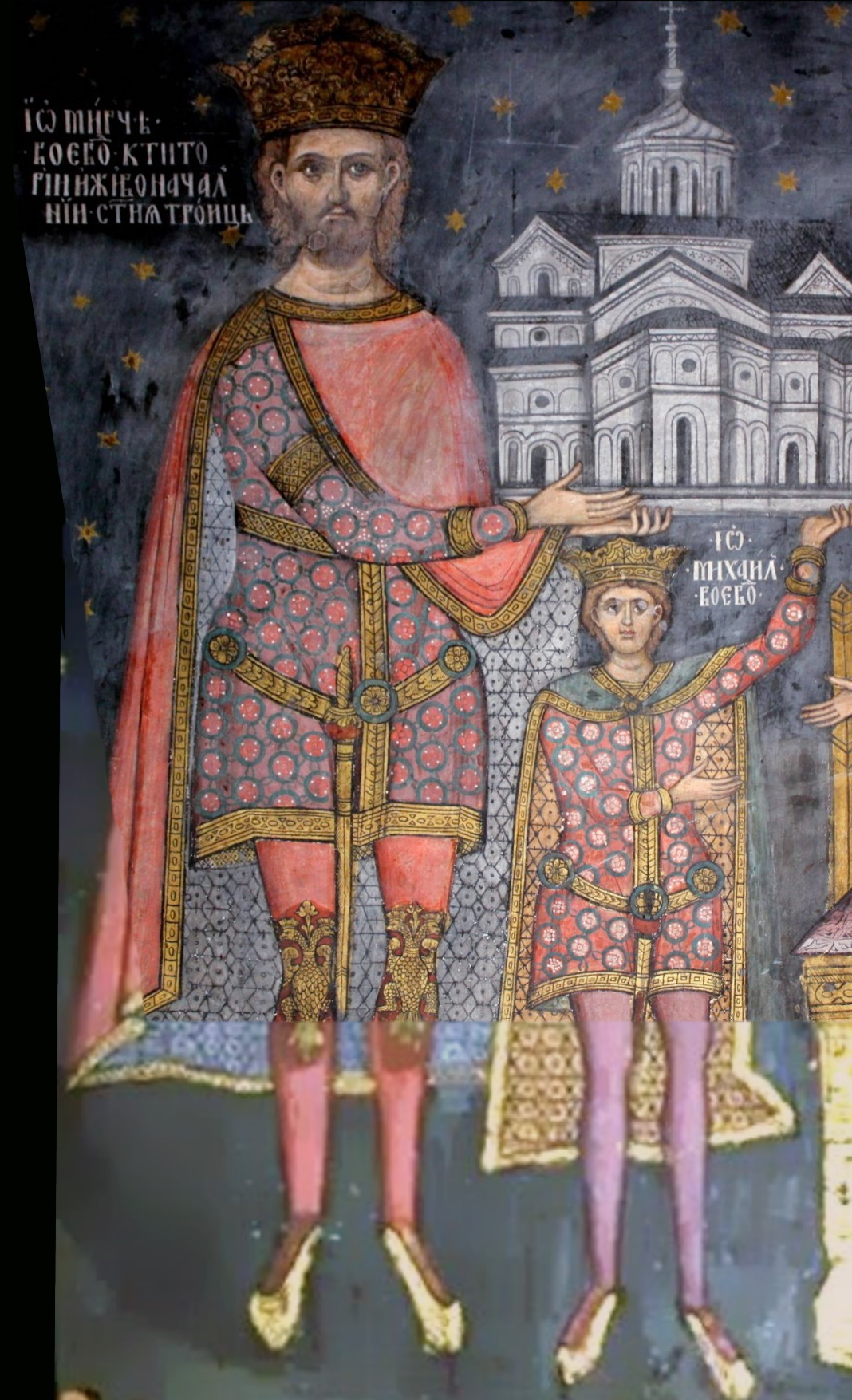
- The child Michael with his father, Mircea I of Wallachia

Voivode of Wallachia together with Mircea I from 1415 to 1418
- Reign: 1415/1418 – 1420
- Predecessor: Mircea I
- Successor: Dan II/ or Radu II of Wallachia
- Died: August 1420
- Issue: Michael; Radu
- House: Basarab
- Father: Mircea I of Wallachia
- Mother: Maria Tolmay

Michael I (Romanian: Mihail I), (? – August 1420) was Voivode of Wallachia from 1415 to 1420. He was the only legitimate son of Mircea I of Wallachia, who made him his co-ruler. Styled as prince from 1415, Michael became sole ruler after his father died in early 1418. His support for a joint campaign with the Hungarians and the resistance put up in 1419 to attacks by the Ottoman Empire caused the Ottoman Sultan, Mehmed I, to invade Wallachia in the spring/summer of 1420. The Ottomans defeated Michael in battle, and he was killed either on the battlefield or after being taken prisoner.

== Early life ==
The son of Mircea I of Wallachia and his wife, Maria Tolmay, Michael was Mircea's only legitimate son. Alexander Aldea and Vlad were Michael's most prominent illegitimate half-brothers, who, in accordance with local custom, could have claimed the throne of Wallachia. To strengthen Michael's position, his father made him his co-ruler.

== Reign ==
Although Michael was first mentioned as Mircea's co-ruler in 1391, it was only from 1415 that he was consistently styled as "voivode and prince". Michael was still his father's co-ruler when in 1417 he refused to send the tribute that Mircea had promised to pay to the Ottoman Empire. Michael became the sole ruler of Wallachia after his father died on 31 January 1418.

The first year of his reign was peaceful because the Ottoman Sultan, Mehmed I, was still occupied with the internal consolidation of the Ottoman Empire. However, small attacks, if not even one campaign conducted by Mehmed himself, could have occurred in 1419, during which Michael managed to hold them off. Michael supported Sigismund of Luxembourg, King of Hungary, who launched a campaign against the Ottoman Empire in the autumn of 1419. They captured the city of Turnu Severin that Michael's father had lost to the Ottomans, but it was put under Sigismund's control. In retaliation, the sultan broke into Wallachia, forcing Michael to cede Giurgiu and other fortresses on the Danube to the Ottomans and to pay the tribute he had failed to send during the previous three years. Michael was also forced to send his two sons, Michael and Radu, as hostages to the Ottoman Empire.

Michael's cousin, Dan, then laid claim to Wallachia. Many of Michael's boyars (including the influential Albul and Utmeș) defected to the pretender. Dan crossed into Wallachia in early 1420. Initially, Michael was able to resist, but since he had failed to implement all provisions of his 1419 treaty with the Ottoman Empire, his cousin was able to obtain military assistance from the Ottomans. Michael received support from Hungary, but their united forces were routed in the summer of 1420. Michael was killed on the battlefield.

== Ancestry ==
Ancestors of Michael I of Wallachia

16. Basarab I of Wallachia
8. Nicholas Alexander of Wallachia
17. Marghita
4. Radu I of Wallachia
18. John Dobokai
9. Clara Dobokai
2. Mircea I of Wallachia
5. Kalinikia
1. Michael I of Wallachia
3. Maria Tolmay

== Sources ==
- Rezachevici, Constantin (2001a). Rolul românilor în apărarea Europei de expansiunea otomană. Secolele XIV-XV. Evoluția unui concept în contextul vremii [The role of the Romanians in defending Europe from Ottoman expansion. 14th-15th centuries. The evolution of a concept in the context of the time] (in Romanian). Bucharest: Editura Albatros. pp. 180–182.
- Rezachevici, Constantin (2001b). Cronologia critică a domnilor din Țara Românească și Moldova a. 1324-1881, vol. I, Secolele XIV-XVI [Critical chronology of the princes of Wallachia and Moldavia, a. 1324-1881, vol. I, 14th-16th centuries] (PDF) (in Romanian). Bucharest: Editura Enciclopedică. pp. 84–87.
- Engel, Pál (2001). The Realm of St Stephen: A History of Medieval Hungary, 895–1526. I.B. Tauris Publishers. ISBN 1-86064-061-3.
- Bolovan, Ioan; Constantiniu, Florin; Michelson, Paul E.; Pop, Ioan Aurel; Popa, Cristian; Popa, Marcel; Scurtu, Ioan; Treptow, Kurt W.; Vultur, Marcela; Watts, Larry L. (1997). A History of Romania. The Center for Romanian Studies. ISBN 973-98091-0-3.
- Florescu, Radu R.; McNally, Raymond T. (1989). Dracula, Prince of Many Faces: His Life and his Times. Back Bay Books. ISBN 978-0-316-28656-5.
- Hasan, Mihai Florin (2013). "Aspecte ale relațiilor matrimoniale munteano-maghiare din secolele XIV-XV [Aspects of Hungarian-Wallachian matrimonial relations of the fourteenth and fifteenth centuries]". Revista Bistriței (in Romanian). XXVII. Complexul Muzeal Bistrița-Năsăud: 128–159. ISSN 1222-5096.
- Treptow, Kurt W. (2000). Vlad III Dracula: The Life and Times of the Historical Dracula. The Center of Romanian Studies. ISBN 973-98392-2-3.

Michael I of Wallachia House of Basarab Died: 1420
Regnal titles
Preceded by Mircea I	Voivode of Wallachia; 1415–1420; With: Mircea I (1415–1418)	Succeeded by Dan II
