= Treaty of Adrianople (1829) =

Territorial settlement which ended the Russo-Turkish War of 1828–29

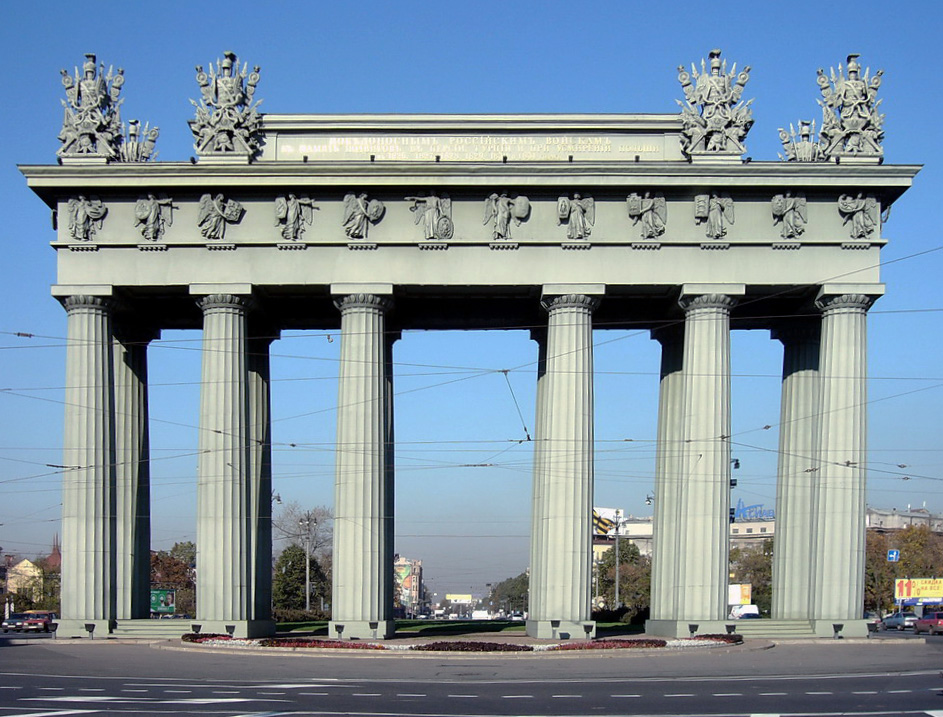
Moscow Triumphal Gate in St. Petersburg (1836–1838) commemorates Russia's victory in the Russo-Turkish War of 1828–1829.

Territorial changes since the Treaty of Adrianople.

The Treaty of Adrianople (also called the Treaty of Edirne) concluded the Russo-Turkish War of 1828–29, between Imperial Russia and the Ottoman Empire. The terms favored Russia, which gained access to the mouths of the Danube and new territory on the Black Sea. The treaty opened the Dardanelles to all commercial vessels, granted autonomy to Serbia, and promised autonomy for Greece. It also allowed Russia to occupy Moldavia and Walachia until the Ottoman Empire had paid a large indemnity; those indemnities were later reduced. The treaty was signed on 14 September 1829 in Adrianople by Count Alexey Fyodorovich Orlov of Russia and Abdülkadir Bey of the Ottoman Empire.

== Terms ==
The Ottoman Empire gave Russia access to the mouths of the Danube and the fortresses of Akhaltsikhe and Akhalkalaki in Georgia. The Sultan recognized Russia's possession of Georgia (with Imeretia, Mingrelia, Guria) and of the Khanates of Erivan and Nakhichevan which had been ceded to the tsar by Persia in the Treaty of Turkmenchay a year earlier. The treaty opened the Dardanelles to all commercial vessels, thus liberating commerce for grain, livestock and lumber. However, it took the Treaty of Hünkâr İskelesi (1833) finally to settle the Straits Question between the signatories.

Under the Treaty of Adrianople, the Sultan reguaranteed the previously promised autonomy to Serbia, promised autonomy for Greece, and allowed Russia to occupy Moldavia and Wallachia until the Ottoman Empire had paid a large indemnity. However, under the modifications of the later Treaty of Hünkâr İskelesi, these indemnities were sharply curtailed. The treaty also fixed the border between the Ottoman Empire and Wallachia on the thalweg of the Danube, transferring to Wallachia the rule of the rayas of Turnu, Giurgiu and Brăila.

The main sections of the treaty were as follows:

1. In recognition of the Treaty of London, the independence of Greece, or autonomy under Ottoman suzerainty, was accepted.
2. The Ottoman Empire had nominal suzerainty over the Danube states of Moldavia and Wallachia; for all practical purposes, they were independent.
3. Russia took control of the towns of Anape and Poti in Caucasus.
4. The Russian traders in Turkey were placed under the legal jurisdiction of the Russian ambassador.

== Demographic changes ==
Among the inhabitants of the annexed territory, Georgians predominated, in addition to whom there lived Azerbaijanis ("Tatars" in the terminology of that time), Turks, Armenians, and Kurds. Soon after the end of hostilities, Turks and Kurds left the newly annexed territories to the Ottoman Empire, and about 30 thousand Ottoman Armenians from Erzurum and Kars Pashalyks settled in their places. The resettled Armenians were not only settled in the Akhaltsikhe and Akhalkalaki regions, but also in Tbilissi, Erevan and Nakhchivan.

== In popular culture ==
- The Treaty of Adrianople is mentioned several times in "The General," an episode of the 1960s British TV series The Prisoner.

== See also ==
- Internationalization of the Danube River
- Treaty of London (1827)
