= Mircea the Elder =

Despot of Dobruja (c. 1355–1418)

- Despot of Dobruja
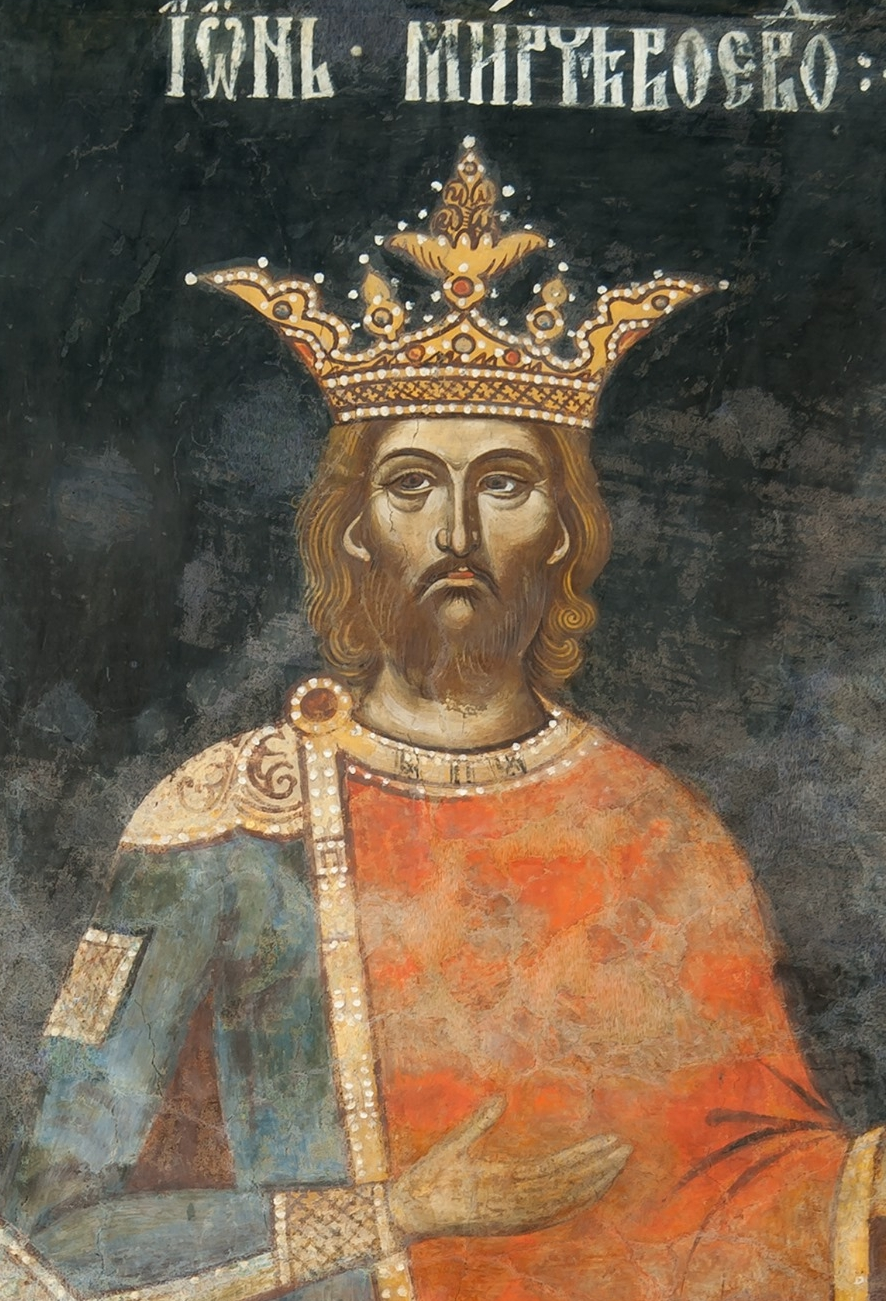
- Mircea the Elder. Fresco in the Episcopal Church of Curtea de Argeș

Voivode of Wallachia
- 1st reign: 23 September 1386 – May 1395
- Predecessor: Dan I of Wallachia
- Successor: Vlad I of Wallachia
- 2nd reign: January 1397 – 31 January 1418
- Predecessor: Vlad I of Wallachia
- Successor: Michael I of Wallachia
- Born: c. 1355
- Died: 31st of January 1418 (aged 62–63)
- Burial: 4 February 1418; Cozia Monastery, Vâlcea County
- Spouse: Doamna Mara; Doamna Anca
- Issue: Michael I of Wallachia; Radu II Praznaglava; Alexandru I Aldea; Vlad II Dracul; Ana of Wallachia; Arina of Wallachia
- House: Basarab
- Father: Radu I of Wallachia
- Mother: Doamna Calinichia
- Religion: Orthodox Christian

Mircea the Elder (Romanian: Mircea cel Bătrân, pronounced [ˈmirtʃe̯a tʃel bəˈtrɨn]; c. 1355 – 31 January 1418) was the Voivode of Wallachia from 1386 until his death in 1418. He was the son of Radu I of Wallachia and brother of Dan I of Wallachia, after whose death he inherited the throne.

After the death of his step-brother Dan I, Mircea took over the throne in 1386, as Wallachia, on one side, was going through a process of economic, administrative, religious development, but also of strengthening the army, and on the other side it was confronted with the expansion tendencies of the Hungarian Kingdom and Poland, which were aiming at controlling the mouths of the Danube, but also those of the Ottoman Empire in the Balkans.

During the reign of Mircea the Elder, Wallachia controlled the largest area in its history, gaining Dobruja in 1388, the Banate of Severin in 1388/9 and Podunavia (which is suspected to be the Timok Valley, or the name of the Danube river valley in Slavonic as stated in Mircea's letter "both sides of Danube"). In addition, he was also granted the fiefdoms of Amlaș (Omlás) and Făgăraș (Fugurash) in Transylvania.

The byname "elder" was given to him after his death in order to distinguish him from his grandson Mircea II ("Mircea the Younger"), although some historians believe the epithet was given to him as a sign of respect by later generations. He is considered the most important Wallachian ruler during the Middle Ages and one of the great rulers of his era, starting in the 19th century, Romanian historiography has also referred to him as Mircea the Great (Mircea cel Mare).

== Family ==
Mircea was the son of voivode Radu I of Wallachia and his wife, Doamna Calinichia, thus being a descendant of the House of Basarab. He was the father of Michael I of Wallachia, Radu II of Wallachia, Alexander I Aldea and Vlad II Dracul, and grandfather of Mircea II, Vlad Țepeș (Dracula), Vlad Călugărul and Radu cel Frumos, all of whom became rulers of Wallachia. Mircea II and Vlad Țepeș were both able military commanders (Vlad Țepeș became one of the most famous leaders in history, and is commonly believed to be the inspiration for the novel Dracula by Bram Stoker). His daughter Arina married the Ottoman prince Musa Çelebi in 1403.

== Reign ==
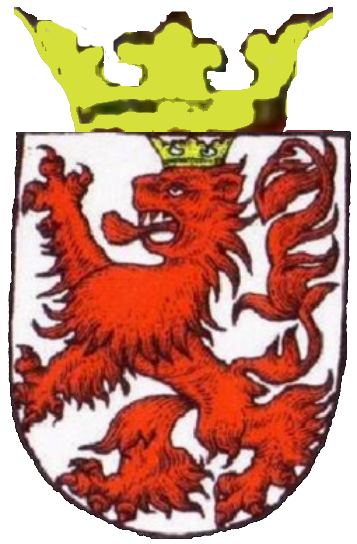
Arms of Mircea I which was also used by other voivodes in the House of Basarab throughout time.

Mircea's reign is often considered to have brought stability to Wallachia. Found in a volatile region of the world, this principality's borders constantly shifted, but during Mircea's rule, Wallachia controlled the largest area in its history: from the Southern Carpathians in the north to the Danube in the south, and from today's Iron Gates on the Danube in the west to the Black Sea in the east. Also Mircea's titles show his lands: "I, in Christ God, the faithful and charitable God and the loving and self-sacrificing Christ, Io Mircea, the great ruler and lord of God's mercy and the gift of God, ruling and reigning over all the land of Ungrovlahia [Wallachia] and the parts above the mountains, duke of the Tartar parts and of Amlaș and Făgăraș, and the ruler of the Banat of Severin, and on both sides throughout Podunavia, even to the great sea and ruler of Dârstor's fortress." Mircea strengthened the power of the state and organized the different high offices, promoted economic development, increased the state's revenue, and minted silver money that enjoyed wide circulation not only inside the country but also in neighboring countries. He gave the merchants of Poland and Lithuania trade privileges and renewed those his predecessors had given to the people of Brașov. As a result, Mircea was able to afford to increase his military power. He fortified the Danube citadels and strengthened "the great army" made up of townspeople and of free and dependent peasants. He also proved to be a great supporter for the Eastern Orthodox Church. Mircea the Elder is the first in the region to deal with slaves giving 300 gypsy dwellings to a monastery in 1388.

While organizing the country and its institutions, Mircea also formed a system of lasting alliances which enabled him to defend the independence of the country. Through the intermediary of Petru Mușat, the prince of Moldavia, he concluded a treaty of alliance with Władysław II Jagiełło, king of Poland in 1389. The treaty was renewed in 1404 and 1410. He maintained close relations with Sigismund of Luxembourg, the king of Hungary, relying on their common interest in the struggle against Ottoman expansion.

=== Conflicts with the Ottoman Empire ===
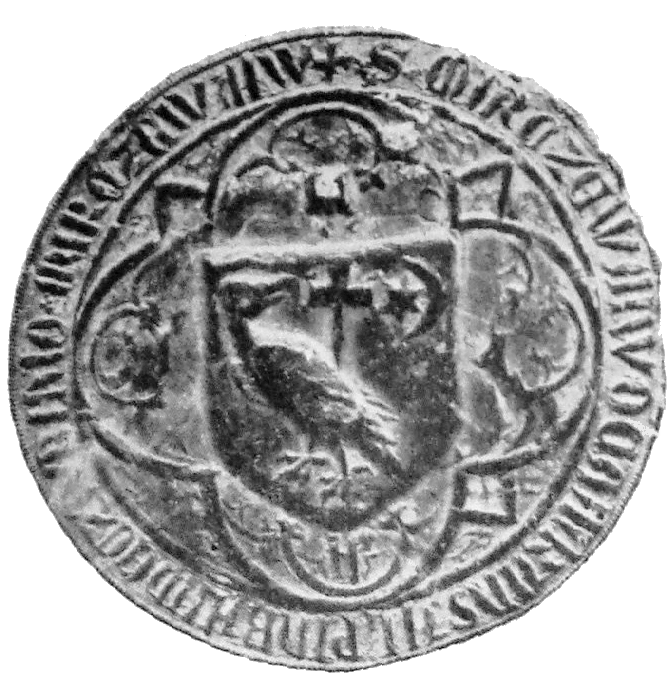
The seal of Voivode Mircea from 1390, depicting the coat of arms of Wallachia

His interventions in support of the Bulgarians south of the Danube who were fighting against the Turks brought him into conflict with the Ottoman Empire. In 1394, Bayezid I crossed the Danube river, leading 40,000 men, an impressive force at the time. Mircea had only about 10,000 men so he could not survive an open fight. He chose to fight what would now be called a guerrilla war, by starving the opposing army and using small, localized attacks and retreats (a typical form of asymmetric warfare). On October 10, 1394, the two armies finally clashed at the Battle of Rovine, which featured a forested and swampy terrain, thus preventing the Ottomans from properly spreading their army. (Note: According to some sources, Mircea won the battle. Other sources indicate either an Ottoman Turk victory or an inconclusive battle.) This famous battle was later epically described by the poet Mihai Eminescu in his Third Epistle. However, Mircea had to retreat to Hungary, while the Turks installed Vlad Uzurpatorul on the throne of Wallachia.

In 1396, Mircea participated in an anti-Ottoman crusade started by Hungary's monarch. The crusade ended with the Ottoman victory at the Battle of Nicopolis on September 25. In the next year, 1397, Mircea, having defeated Vlad the Usurper with help from the Voivode of Transylvania, Stibor, stopped another Ottoman expedition that crossed the Danube, and in 1400 he defeated yet another expedition of Turks crossing the country.

The defeat of Sultan Beyazid I by Timur Lenk (Tamerlane) at Ankara in the summer of 1402 opened a period of anarchy in the Ottoman Empire and Mircea took advantage of it to organize together with the Hungarian king a campaign against the Turks. In 1404 Mircea was thus able to impose his rule on Dobruja again. Moreover, Mircea took part in the struggles for the throne of the Ottoman Empire and enabled Musa to ascend that throne (for a brief reign). It was at this time that the prince reached the height of his power.

Towards the end of his reign, Mircea signed a treaty with the Ottomans; in return for a tribute of 3,000 gold pieces per year, the Ottomans desisted from making Wallachia a province ("pashalik").

== Legacy ==
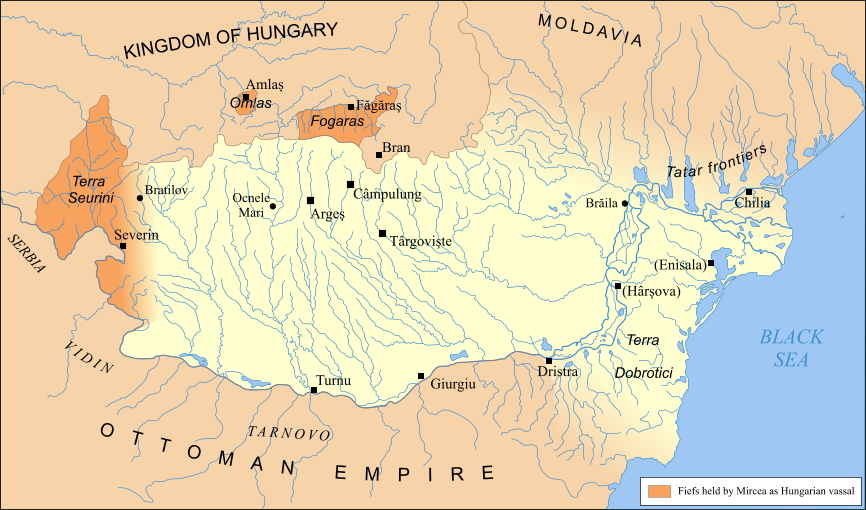
Wallachia under Mircea cel Bătrân, c. 1390

The "bravest and ablest of the Christian princes", as he was described by German historian Leunclavius, ruled Wallachia for 32 years. Mircea was a ktetor, building among other monuments, the Cozia Monastery near Călimănești in ca. 1390. He had churches built after Serbian architectural styles, after the models of the Lazarica Church, Veluće, Naupara, and Kalenić monastery.

== In popular culture ==
Mircea was played by Sergiu Nicolaescu in the 1989 film Mircea, which was also directed by Nicolaescu.

== Sources ==
- Boia, Lucian (2001). Romania:Borderland of Europe. Reaktion books.
- Brackob, A.K. (2023). Dracul – Of the Father: The Untold Story of Vlad Dracul. Histria Books.
- Fine, John Van Antwerp (1994). The Late Medieval Balkans: A Critical Survey from the Late Twelfth Century to the Ottoman Conquest. Ann Arbor: University of Michigan Press. ISBN 978-0-472-08260-5.
- Grumeza, Ion (2010). The Roots of Balkanization: Eastern Europe C.E. 500-1500. Bloomsbury Academic.
- Hösch, Edgar (1972). The Balkans: A Short History from Greek Times to the Present Day. Crane, Russak.
- Inalcik, Halil (1992). "Bayezid I". Islam Ansiklopedisi (in Turkish).
- Sedlar, Jean W. (2013). East Central Europe in the Middle Ages, 1000-1500. Vol. 3. University of Washington Press.
- (in Romanian) Bogdan Petriceicu Hasdeu, Istoria critică a românilor, vol. I, Bucharest, 1875
- (in Romanian) A. D. Xenopol, Istoria românilor din Dacia Traiană, vol. I, Iași, 1889
- (in Romanian) Nicolae Iorga, Studii și documente cu privire la istoria românilor, vol. III, Bucharest, 1901
- (in Romanian) Constantin C. Giurescu, Istoria Românilor, vol. I, Bucharest, 1938
- (in English) Dr. A.K. Brackob, Mircea the Old: Father of Wallachia, Grandfather of Dracula, Buffalo U.S.A., 2018

Mircea the Elder House of Basarab Born: 1355 Died: 1418
Regnal titles
Preceded by Dan I	Voivode of Wallachia; 1386–1394/1395	Succeeded by Vlad I Uzurpatorul (The Usurper)
Preceded by Vlad I Uzurpatorul	restored as Voivode of Wallachia; 1397–1418	Succeeded by Mihail I
