= Călugărul =

Călugărul literally meaning "the Monk" may refer to:

- Călugărul River (disambiguation)
- Misail the Monk (Misail Călugărul) (fl.. 17th century), Moldavian monk, copyist, and chronicler
- Vlad Călugărul (fl.. 15th century), Prince of Wallachia
- Radu vodă Călugărul (fl.. 16th century), Prince of Wallachia

== See also ==
- Călugărul Vlahuţă, painting by Aurel Băeșu
- Călugăru (disambiguation)
- Călugăreasa River
