= Dan III of Wallachia =

Pretender to the throne of Wallachia (1456 - 1460); son of Dan II of Wallachia

Dan the Younger
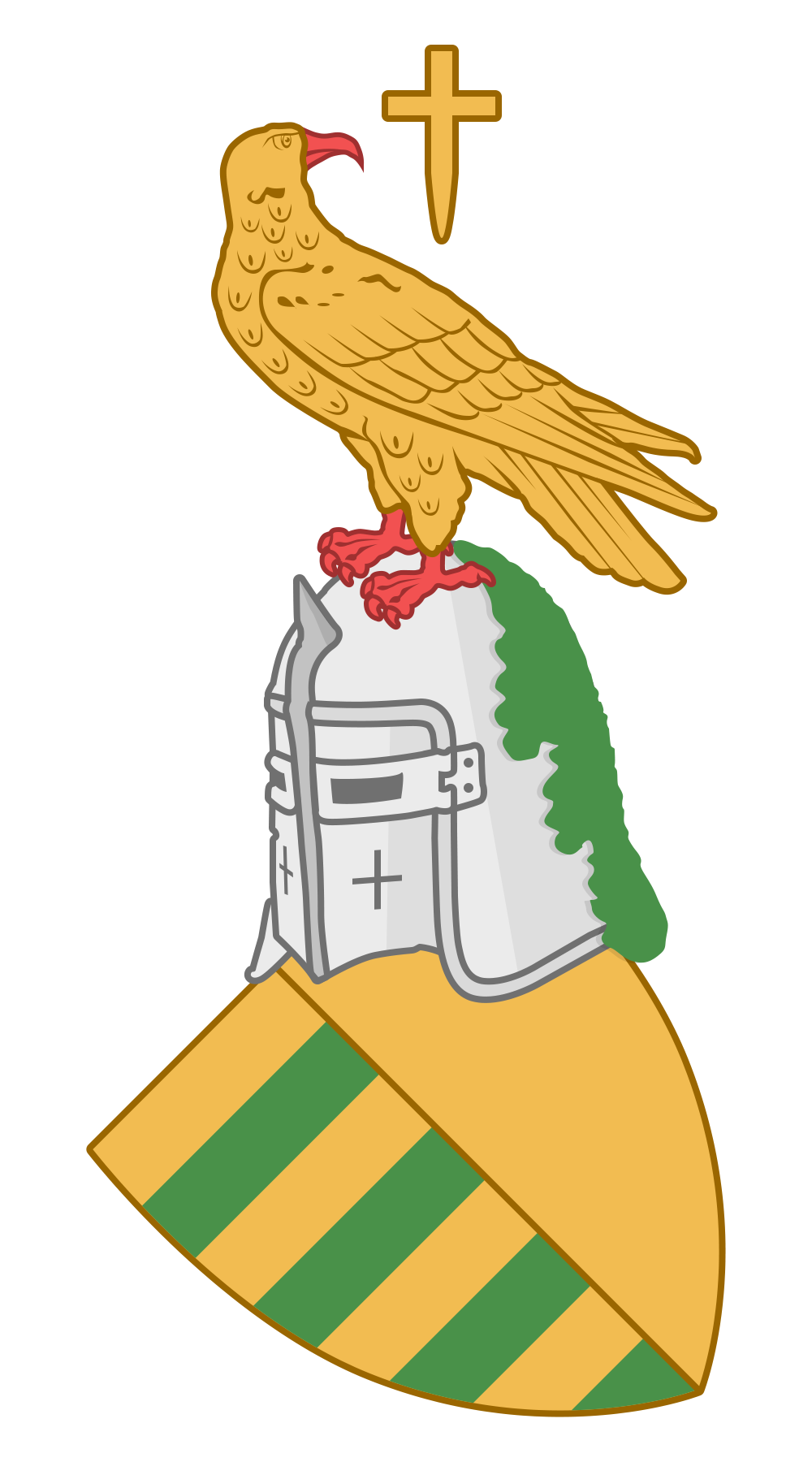
- Coat of arms of the House of Basarab
- Died: April 1460; Rucăr
- Burial: Church of St. Nicholas at Târgșor (?)
- Issue: Albert; Peter
- House: House of Dănești
- Father: Dan II of Wallachia
- Mother: Maria

Dan the Younger, also known as Dan the Pretender (executed in April 1460), was a pretender to the throne of Wallachia from 1456 to 1460. He was the son of Dan II of Wallachia, who died fighting for the throne in 1431. After Dan's brother, Vladislav II of Wallachia, was killed by their cousin, Vlad Dracula, in a duel in 1456, Dan settled in Brașov. Besides Dan, Vlad Dracula's half-brother, Vlad the Monk, and Dan's brother, Basarab Laiotă, laid claim to Wallachia against Dracula.

Dan tried to seize Wallachia with the support of the burghers of the town but was defeated and captured in a battle near Rucăr. He was forced to dig his own grave before he was beheaded.

== Early life ==
Dan was the brother of Vladislav II of Wallachia, a son of Dan II of Wallachia. Dan II died fighting for Wallachia against his cousin, Alexander I Aldea, in 1431. Vladislav II seized Wallachia from Alexander Aldea's brother, Vlad II, with the support of John Hunyadi, Governor of Hungary, in late 1447. After Vladislav II submitted himself to the Ottoman Sultan, Mehmed II, Hunyadi supported Vlad II's son, Vlad Dracula, to invade Wallachia and seize the throne after 15 April 1456. Vladislav II was captured and beheaded during the invasion.

== Pretender ==
Dan settled in Șcheii (outside the walls of Brașov) in Transylvania. Boyars from Wallachia and Făgăraș joined him. On 16 December 1456, John Hunyadi's son, Ladislaus Hunyadi, ordered the Saxons of Brașov and Țara Bârsei to support Dan against Vlad Dracula who had "caused much inconvenience and damage" in Transylvania, but Dan could not chase Vlad from Wallachia. The Saxon burghers of Sibiu supported Vlad Dracula's half-brother, Vlad the Monk, to seize Amlaș (which had been traditionally held in Transylvania by the princes of Wallachia) before 14 March 1457.

Ladislaus V of Hungary had Ladislaus Hunyadi executed on 16 March. Hunyadi's maternal uncle, Michael Szilágyi, rose up against the king, but the Transylvanian Saxons remained faithful to the monarch. Taking advantage of the situation, Vlad Dracula plundered Țara Bârsei in 1457. Vlad's envoys were present at the negotiations between Szilágyi and the Saxons. Szilágyi and the Saxons signed a peace treaty on 23 or 24 November 1457, which obliged the burghers of Brașov to expel Dan from the town.

Relations between Vlad Dracula and the Saxons became tense again, because Vlad captured and impaled "all the merchants of Brașov and Țara Bârsei" who had settled in Wallachia. Dan returned to Brașov with the support of Matthias Corvinus, the new king of Hungary, in early 1459. On 5 April, Dan authorized the officials of Brașov to confiscate the wealth of the Wallachian merchants who had fled from the town because of the emerging conflict. After Vlad Dracul broke into Țara Bârsei, plundering the region in August or September, Dan accused him of cooperating with the Ottoman Empire.

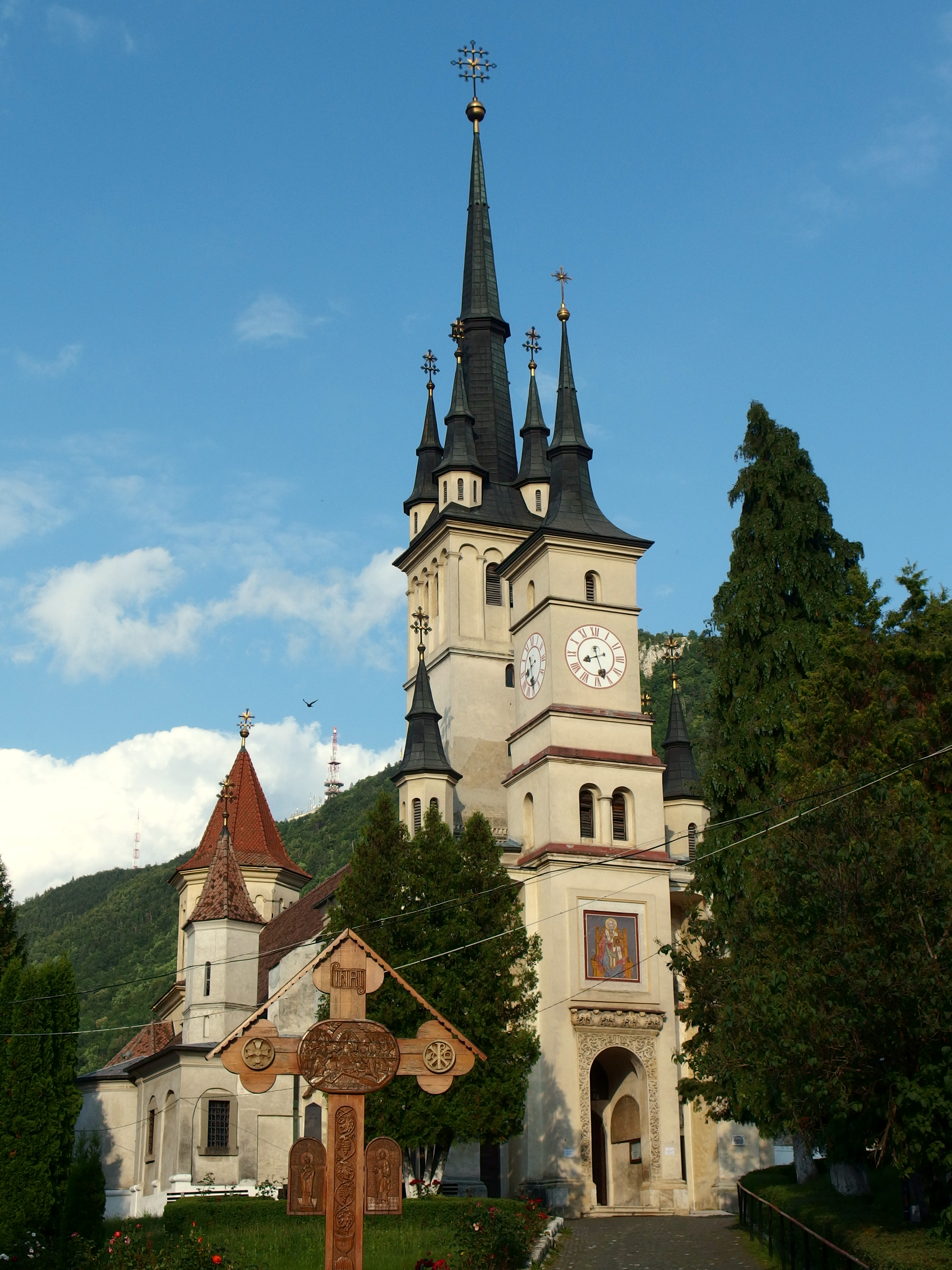
The Orthodox St. Nicholas Church in Șcheii in Brașov

A third pretender to the Wallachian throne, Basarab Laiotă, settled in Sighișoara. He offered to fight for the Saxons of Brașov against Vlad Dracula with a troop of 500 strong if he received financial support in early 1460. Dan decided to invade Wallachia and authorized the burghers of Brașov to keep the goods that they had seized from Wallachian merchants in exchange for their support for him on 2 March 1460. He took possession of the domains of Făgăraș and Amlaș (the Transylvanian fiefs of the voivodes of Wallachia), and imprisoned or killed Vlad Dracula's local supporters.

He broke into Wallachia in April, but he was defeated and captured in a battle near Rucăr. Vlad Dracula forced Dan to "dig his own grave" before beheading him. Dan's supporters were impaled. After being informed of Dan's death, the burghers of Brașov sent an embassy to Vlad, but he imprisoned their envoys and again plundered the lands near the town. Historians Radu Florescu and Raymont T. McNally say, the Church of St. Nicholas at Târgșor was built during the reign of Vlad Dracula who wanted to atone for the murders of Vladislav II and Dan. Kurt W. Treptow writes, the church may have rather been built to celebrate Vlad's victory over Vladislav and Dan.

... [Vlad] captured [Dan the Younger] and forced him to dig his own grave and ordered that the funeral service be read according to the Christian ritual, and then he had him beheaded next to his tomb.

— About a mischievous tyrant called Dracula vodă (No. 7.)

== Family ==
Dan had two sons, Albert and Peter. Albert's name suggests that his mother (Dan's wife) was a Roman Catholic woman, according to the Romanian historian Nicolae Iorga. The two sons settled in Transylvania after Dan's death.

== Sources ==
- Florescu, Radu R.; McNally, Raymond T. (1989). Dracula, Prince of Many Faces: His Life and his Times. Back Bay Books. ISBN 978-0-316-28656-5.
- Rezachevici, Constantin (1991). "Vlad Țepeș – Chronology and historical bibliography". In Treptow, Kurt W. (ed.). Dracula: Essays on the Life and Times of Vlad Țepeș. East European Monographs, Distributed by Columbia University Press. pp. 253–294. ISBN 0-88033-220-4.
- Stoicescu, Nicolae (1991). "Vlad Țepeș' relations with Transylvania and Hungary". In Treptow, Kurt W. (ed.). Dracula: Essays on the Life and Times of Vlad Țepeș. East European Monographs, Distributed by Columbia University Press. pp. 81–101. ISBN 0-88033-220-4.
- Treptow, Kurt W. (2000). Vlad III Dracula: The Life and Times of the Historical Dracula. The Center of Romanian Studies. ISBN 973-98392-2-3.
