= List of monarchs by nickname =

This is a list of monarchs (and other royalty and nobility) sorted by nickname.

This list is divided into two parts:

- Cognomens: Also called cognomina. These are names which are appended before or after the person's name, like the epitheton necessarium, or Roman victory titles. Examples are "William the Conqueror" for William I of England, and "Frederick Barbarossa" for Frederick I, Holy Roman Emperor.
- Sobriquets: Names which have become identified with a particular person, and are recognizable when used instead of the personal name. Some are used only in a particular context: for example, "Grandmother of Europe" for Queen Victoria is generally only used when referring to her family links throughout the royal families of Europe. On the other hand, in some cases the nickname supersedes the personal name, and the individual is referred to by this nickname even in scholarly works: for example, Roman emperor Gaius Julius Caesar Germanicus is universally known by his nickname, Caligula.

Notes:

- Nicknames are listed in each section alphabetically, ignoring articles and prepositions.
- Non-English words are rendered in italics, and translated where possible.
- When the name and nickname are rendered in a non-English language, the nickname will be in **boldface italics**.

== Cognomen ==
A swung dash, or tilde (~), is used to indicate where the personal name occurs in the nickname; thus "~ the Accursed", followed by entries about Sviatopolk, Alexander and Tekle Haymanot, means "Sviatopolk the Accursed", "Alexander the Accursed" and "Tekle Haymanot the Accursed".

=== A ===
- "~ the Abandoned": **John I of Aragon** (Catalan: Joan **el Descurat**; also known as John the Hunter or John the Lover of Elegance)
- "~ the Absolutist/the Absolute-King: **Miguel I of Portugal** (Portuguese: Miguel **o Absolutista/o Rei-Absoluto**)
- "~ the Accursed":
  - **Sviatopolk I of Kiev** (Russian: Святопо́лк **Окая́нный**)
  - **Iskander the Accursed** (Middle Persian: **Gizistag** Aleksandar; more commonly known as Alexander the Great)
  - **Tekle Haymanot I of Ethiopia** (Amharic: እርጉም ተክለ ሃይማኖት **irgum** tekle hāymānōt)
- "~ the Adopted": **Childebert of Austrasia** (Latin: Childebertus **Adoptivus**)
- "~ (the) Ætheling": (Note: Old English for "Princeling") **Edgar Ætheling of England** (Old English: Eadgar **Æþeling**)
- "~ the Affable": **Charles VIII of France** (French: Charles **l'Affable**)
- "~ the African":
  - **Scipio the African** (Publius Cornelius Scipio **Africanus**).
  - **Afonso V of Portugal** (Afonso **o Africano**)
  - **Alfonso XIII of Spain** (Alfonso **el Africano**)
- "~ the Aggressor": **Indulf of Alba** (Scottish Gaelic: Ildulb **An Ionsaighthigh**)
- "~ the Alchemist": **John, Margrave of Brandenburg-Kulmbach** (German: Johann **der Alchimist**)
- "~ Albanian-slayer": **Thomas of Epirus** (Greek: Θωμάς **Ἀλβανιτόκτονος**, Thomás **Albanitóktonos**)
- "~ All-fair": **Eadwig of England**
- "~ the Apostate": **Julian, Roman Emperor** (Latin: Flavius Claudius Julianus **Apostata**)
- "~ the Arab": **Philip I, Roman Emperor** (Latin: Marcus Julius Philippus **Arabs**)
- "~ the Artist-King": **Ferdinand II of Portugal** (Portuguese: Fernando **o Rei-Artista**)
- "~ the Asleep": **Sebastian of Portugal** (Portuguese: Sebastião **o Adormecido**)
- "~ the Astrologer": **Alfonso X of Castile** (Spanish: Alfonso **el Astrólogo**; more commonly known as Alfonso the Wise)
- "~ the Avenger": **Alfonso XI of Castile** (Spanish: Alfonso el **Justiciero**; also known as Alfonso the Just)

=== B ===
- "~ the Bad":
  - **Alexander III of Wallachia** (Romanian: Alexandru **cel Rău**)
  - **Arnulf, Duke of Bavaria** (German: Arnulf **der Böse**)
  - **Charles II of Navarre** (French: Charles **le Mauvais**)
  - **Emund of Sweden** (Swedish: Emund **Slemme**; more commonly known as Emund the Old)
  - **Mihnea of Wallachia** (Romanian: Mihnea **cel Rău**)
  - **Ordoño IV of León** (Spanish: Ordoño **el Malo**)
  - **Sigurd Magnusson, pretender of Norway** (Old Norse: Sigurd **Slembe** or Sigurd **Slembedjakn**)
  - **William I of Sicily** (Italian: Guglielmo **il Malo**)
- "~ the Bald":
  - **Charles II of France** (French: Charles **le Chauve**)
  - **Baldwin II, Count of Flanders** (Dutch: Boudewijn II **de Kale**; Latin: Balduinus **Calvus**)
  - **Idwal ab Anarawd of Gwynedd** (Welsh: Idwal **Foel**)
  - **Radu II of Wallachia** (Church Slavonic: Radu **Praznaglava**)
  - **Constantine III of Scotland** (Middle Irish: Causantín **in Maol**)
- "~ Barbarossa": (Note: Italian for Red-Beard) **Frederick I, Holy Roman Emperor** (German: Friederich **Barbarossa**)
- "~ Barefoot" or "~ Bareleg": **Magnus III of Norway** (Old Norse: Magnus **Barfot**)
- "~ Barn-Lock": **Magnus III of Sweden** (Swedish: Magnus **Ladulås**)
- "~ the Bastard":
  - **Ebalus, Duke of Aquitaine** (French: Ebles **Manzer**, Hebrew: Ebles **Mamzer**)
  - **Henry II of Castile** (Spanish: Enrique **el Bastardo**; more commonly known as Henry of Trastámara)
  - **John I of Portugal** (Portuguese: João **o Bastardo**; more commonly known John of Avis, John the Great, or John of Fond Memory)
  - **William I of England** (French: Guillaume **le Bâtard**; Old English: Wyllelm or Willelm **bastard**; more commonly known as William the Conqueror)
- "~ the Battler": **Alfonso I of Aragon** (Spanish: Alfonso, **el Batallador**; also known as Alfonso the Warrior)
- "~ the Bavarian": **Louis IV, Holy Roman Emperor** (German: Ludwig **der Bayer**)
- "~ the Bear": **Albert the Bear** (German: Albrecht **der Bär**)
- "~ the Bearded":
  - **Baldwin IV, Count of Flanders** (French: Baldouin **le Barbu**)
  - **Berthold II, Duke of Carinthia** (German: Berthold **der Bärtige**)
  - **Constans II, Byzantine Emperor** (Greek: Κώνστας **ὁ Πωγωνᾶτος**)
  - **Eberhard I, Duke of Württemberg** (German: Eberhard im Bart)
  - **Egino IV, Count of Urach** (German: Egino der Bärtige)
  - **Geoffrey III of Anjou** (French: Geoffroy **le Barbu**)
  - **Henry I, Duke of Silesia** (Polish: Henryk **Brodaty**)
- "~ Beauclerk" or "~ Beauclerc" (French, "Good Clerk"): **Henry I of England** (French: Henri **Beauclerc**)
- "~ the Beer Jug": **John George I, Elector of Saxony** (German: Johann Georg **der Bierkrug**)
- "~ the Beloved": **Louis XV of France** (French: Louis **le Bien-Aimé**)
- "~ the Bewitched": **Charles II of Spain** (Spanish: Carlos **el Hechizado**)
- "~ the Bibliophile": **Manuel II of Portugal** (Portuguese: Manuel **o Bibliófilo**; more commonly known as Manuel the Patriot or Manuel the Unfortunate)
- "~ the Big Nest": **Vsevolod III Yuriyevich of Vladimir** (Russian: Все́волод III Ю́рьевич **Большо́е Гнездо́**, Vsévolod III Yúr'yevich '**Bol'shóe Gnezdó**)
- "~ the Black Prince": **Edward the Black Prince** (French: Édouard **le Prince Noir**)
- "~ the Black":
  - **Leszek II the Black** (Polish: Leszek **Czarny**)
  - **Fulk III of Anjou** (French: Foulque **Nerra**)
  - **Halfdan III of Vestfold** (Norwegian: Halfdan **den svarte**)
  - **Henry III, Holy Roman Emperor** (German: Heinrich **der Schwarze**; also called the pious)
  - **Henry IX, Duke of Bavaria** (German: Heinrich **der Schwarze**)
  - **Margaret II, Countess of Flanders** (French: Marguerite **la Noire**)
- "~ the Blessed": **Alexander I of Russia** (Russian: Александр **Благословенный**)
- "~ the Blind":
  - **Boleslaus III of Bohemia** (Czech: Boleslav **Slepý**; also known as Boleslaus the Red)
  - **Béla II of Hungary** (Hungarian: II. **Vak** Béla)
  - **Magnus IV of Norway** (Old Norse: Magnus **Blinde**)
  - **Stefan Branković** (Serbian: Стефан **Слепи**)
  - **Vasily II Vasiliyevich** (Russian: Василий II **Темный**)
  - **Bogdan III of Moldavia** (Romanian: Bogdan **cel Orb**)
  - **John of Bohemia** (Luxembourgish: Jang **de Blannen**; German: Johann **der Blinde**; Czech: Jan **Slepý**)
- "~ the Blind Earl": **Edward de Courtenay, 3rd/11th Earl of Devon**
- "~ the Blond": **Selim II of the Ottoman Empire** (Turkish: **Sarı** Sultân Selim)
- "~ Bloodaxe": **Eric I of Norway** (Old Norse: Eiríkr **Blóðöx**)
- "~ the Bloodthirsty": **Ismail of Morocco** (Arabic: إسماعيل المتعطش للدماء)
- "Bloody ~": **Mary I of England**
- "~ the Bloody": **Nicholas II of Russia** (Russian: Николай II **Кровавый**)
- "~ Bluetooth": **Harold I of Denmark** (Old Norse: Haraldr **blátönn**)
- "~ the Bold":
  - **Boleslaw II of Poland** (Polish: Bolesław **Śmiały**)
  - **Charles of Burgundy** (French: Charles **le Téméraire**)
  - **Philip II of France** (French: Philippe **le Hardi**)
  - **Philip III of France** (French: Philippe **le Hardi**)
- "~ the Boneless": **Ivar Ragnarsson** (Old Norse: Ívarr hinn Beinlausi)
- "~ the Bookish" or "~ the Book-Lover": **Coloman of Hungary** (Hungarian: **Könyves** Kálmán; more commonly known as Coloman the Learned)
- "~ the Boulonnais": **Afonso III of Portugal** (Portuguese: Afonso **o Bolonhês**)
- "~ the Brash": **Olof of Denmark**
- "~ the Brave":
  - **Afonso IV of Portugal** (Portuguese: Afonso **o Bravo**)
  - **Boleslaw I of Poland** (Polish: Bolesław **Chrobry**; also known as Boleslaw the Great)
  - **Dan II of Wallachia** (Romanian: Dan al II-lea **cel Viteaz**)
  - **John III of Moldavia** (Romanian: Ioan Vodă **cel** **Viteaz**; more commonly known as John the Terrible)
  - **Michael of Wallachia, Transylvania and Moldavia** (Romanian: Mihai **Viteazul**)
- "~ the Brilliant": **George V of Georgia** (Georgian: გიორგი V ბრწყინვალე, romanized: giorgi V brts'q'invale)
- "~ the Broad-shouldered": **Haakon II of Norway** (Old Norse: Hákon **Herdebrei**)
- "~ Broom-plant": **Geoffrey V, Count of Anjou** (French: Geoffroy **Plantagenet**; also known as Geoffrey the Fair)
- "~ the Brown": **Donnchadh mac Flainn, High King of Ireland** (Irish: Donnchad **Donn**)
- "~ the Bruce": **Robert I of Scotland** (Medieval Gaelic: Roibert **a Briuis**)
- "~ Builder":
  - **David IV of Georgia** (Georgian: დავით **აღმაშენებელი**, romanized: davit **aghmashenebeli**)
  - **Peter III of Portugal** (Portuguese: Pedro **o Edificador**)
- "~ the Builder King": **Leopold II of Belgium** (French: Léopold le **roi bâtisseur**, Dutch: Leopold de **Koning-Bouwheer**)
- "~ Bulgar-Slayer": **Basil II, Byzantine Emperor** (Greek: Βασίλειος **Βουλγαροκτόνος**, Basíleios Boulgaroktónos)

=== C ===
- "~ Capet": (Note: Possibly meaning "cloaked" or from Latin "caput", meaning head; etymology uncertain) **Hugh Capet** (French: Hugues Capet)
- "~ the Cabbage": **Ivaylo of Bulgaria** (Bulgarian: Ивайло **Лахана**, Greek: Ιβάιλο **o Λαχανάς**)
- "~ the Capacidónio": (Note: From Portuguese "capaz", capable, and "idóneo", idoneous) **Peter III of Portugal** (Portuguese: Pedro **o Capacidónio**; also known as Peter the Builder)
- "~ the Cardinal-King": **Henry, King of Portugal** (Portuguese: Henrique **o Cardeal-Rei**)
- "~ the Capuched": **Sancho II of Portugal** (Portuguese: Sancho **o Capelo**; also known as Sancho the Hooded or Sancho the Pious)
- "~ the Catholic":
  - **Alfonso I of Asturias** (Spanish: Alonso **el Católico**)
  - **Andrew I of Hungary** (Hungarian: András **Katolikus**; more commonly known as Andrew the White)
  - **Ferdinand II of Aragon** (Spanish: Fernando **el Católico**, Catalan: **Ferran el Catòlic**)
  - **Isabella I of Castile** (Spanish: Isabel **la Católica**)
  - **Peter II of Aragon** (Spanish: Pedro II el Católico, Catalan: Pere **el Catòlic**)
  - **Frederick I, Duke of Austria** (German: Friedrich **der Katholische**)
- "~ the Caulker": **Michael V, Byzantine Emperor** (Greek: Μιχαήλ **Καλαφάτης**, Michaíl Kalaphátis)
- "~ the Ceremonious": **Peter IV of Aragon** (Spanish: Pedro **el Ceremonioso**, Catalan: Pere **el Cerimoniós**)
- "~ the Chaste":
  - **Alfonso II of Aragon** (Catalan: Alfons **el Cast**; Spanish: Alfonso **el Casto**; French: Alphonse **le Chaste**; also known as Alfonso the Troubador)
  - **Alfonso II of Asturias** (Spanish: Alfonso **el Casto**)
  - **Bolesław V the Chaste** (Polish: Bolesław **Wstydliwy**)
  - **Henry, King of Portugal** (Portuguese: Henrique **o Casto**)
- "~ the Chief": **Kenneth III of Scotland** (Scottish Gaelic: Coinneach **An Donn**)
- "~ the Child"
  - **Charles, King of Aquitaine** (French: Charles **l'Enfant**)
  - **Henry II, Margrave of Brandenburg-Stendal** (German: Heinrich **das Kind**)
  - **Henry I, Landgrave of Hesse** (German: Heinrich **das Kind**)
  - **Otto I, Duke of Brunswick-Luneburg** (German: Otto **das Kind**)
  - **Louis III of East Francia** (German: Ludwig **das Kind**)
  - **Louis of Sicily** (Italian: Ludovico **il Fanciullo**)
  - **Nicholas I, Lord of Rostock** (German: Nikolaus **das Kind**)
- "~ the Clement": **John VI of Portugal** (Portuguese: João **o Clemente**)
- "~ the Clubfoot": **Sverker I of Sweden** (Swedish: Sverker **Klumpfot**)
- "~ Coal-Burner": **Anund Jacob of Sweden** (Old Norse: Emund **Kolbränna**)
- "~ the Confessor": **Edward the Confessor** (of England), also known as Saint Edward
- "~ the Colonizer": **John III of Portugal** (Portuguese: João **o Colonizador**)
- "~ the Conqueror":
  - **Afonso I of Portugal** (Portuguese: Afonso **o Conquistador**)
  - **Charles V, Holy Roman Emperor** (Spanish: Carlos **el Conquistador**; German: Karl **der Eroberer**)
  - **James I of Aragon** (Catalan: Jaume **el Conqueridor**)
  - **John V, Duke of Brittany** (French: Jean **le Conquérant**)
  - **Mehmed II of The Ottoman Empire** (Ottoman Turkish: **Fatih** Sultan Mehmed)
  - **Nicholas I of Russia**
  - **William I of England** (Old English: Wilhelm **se Gehīersumiend**; French: Guillaume **le Conquérant**)
  - **Valdemar II of Denmark** (Old Norse: Valdemar **Sejr**)
- "~ the Constable Prince": **John, Constable of Portugal** (Portuguese: João **o Infante Condestável**)
- "~ the Constant": **John, Elector of Saxony** (German: Johann **der Beständige**)
- "~ Corvinus" (from Latin "like a raven"): **Matthias Corvinus of Hungary** (Hungarian: **Corvinus** Mátyás; Romanian: Matei **Corvin**)
- "~ the Courteous": **William, Duke of Austria** (German: Wilhelm **der Freundliche**)
- "~ the Crosseyed": **Vasili Kosoi, Muscovian usurper** (Russian: Василий **Косой**, Vasiliy Kosoy)
- "~ Crouchback":
  - **Inge I of Norway** (Old Norse: Inge **Krokrygg**)
  - **Richard III of England** (also known as **Crookback**)
- "~ the Cruel":
  - **Boleslaus I of Bohemia** (Czech: Boleslav I. **Ukrutný**)
  - **Boleslaus II of Poland** (Polish: Bolesław **Okrutny**)
  - **Louis XI of France**
  - **Peter I of Portugal** (Portuguese: Pedro **o Cruel**)
  - **Peter of Castile** (Spanish: Pedro **el Cruel**)
- "~ the Crusader":
  - **Sigurd I of Norway** (Old Norse: Sigurðr **Jórsalafarinn**; Norwegian: Sigurd **Jorsalfare**)
  - **Robert II, Count of Flanders** (French: Robert **le Croisé**)
  - **Gaston IV, Viscount of Béarn** (French: Gaston **le Croisé**)
  - **Simon V, Lord of Montfort** (French: Simon **le Croisé**)
- "~ the Curly" **Bolesław IV the Curly** (Polish: Bolesław **Kędzierzawy**)
- "~ Curthose" (Middle English, "short stockings"): **Robert II, Duke of Normandy** (French: Robert **Courtehouse**)
- "~ Curtmantle" (Middle English, "short cloak"): **Henry II of England**

=== D ===
- "~ the Damned" or "~ the Accursed": **Sviatopolk I of Kiev** (Russian: Святополк **Окаянный**, Svyatopolk **Okayannyy**; Ukrainian: Святополк **Окаянний**, Svyatopolk **Okayannyy̆**)
- "~ the Deacon": **Bermudo I of Asturias** (Asturian: Bermudo **el Diáconu**; Spanish: Bermudo **el Diácono**)
- "~ the Debonaire": **Louis I of France** (French: Louis **le Débonnaire**)
- "~ the Deed-Doer": **Edmund I of England**
- "~ the Desired":
  - **Ferdinand VII of Spain**
  - **Louis XVIII of France**
  - **Sebastian of Portugal** (Portuguese: Sebastião **o Desejado**)
- "~ the Determined": **Anthony I of Portugal** (Portuguese: António **o Determinado**)
- "~ the Devil":
  - **Robert I, Duke of Normandy** (French: Robert **le Diable**)
  - **Vlad II of Wallachia** (Romanian: Vlad **Dracul**)
  - **Hugh VI, Lord of Lusignan** (French: Hughes **le Diable**)
  - **Robert II, Lord of Bellême** (French: Robert **le Diable**)
- "~ the Diplomat": **Charles I of Portugal** (Portuguese: Carlos **o Diplomata**)
- "~ Do-Nothing", "~ the Indolent" or "~ the Sluggard": **Louis V of France** (French: Louis **le Fainéant**)
- "~ Dracul" (Romanian, "The Devil" or "The Dragon"): **Vlad II of Wallachia** (Romanian: Vlad **Dracul**)
- "~ Dracula" (Romanian, "Son of the Devil" or "Son of the Dragon"): **Vlad III of Wallachia**
- "~ the Drunkard":
  - **Michael III, Byzantine Emperor** (Greek: Μιχαήλ Γ' **ο Μέθυσος**, Michaíl G' **o Méthysos**)
  - **Selim II, Ottoman Emperor** (Turkish: Selim **Sarhoş**)
  - **Wenceslaus, King of the Romans** (German: Wenzel **der Säufer**; Czech: Václav **Opilec**)
- "~ the Dung-Named": **Constantine V, Byzantine Emperor** (Greek: Κωνσταντίνος **Ε' Κοπρόνυμος**, Konstantínos E' Koprónymos)

=== E ===
- "Earth-Shaker ~": **Inca** **Yupanqui** (Quechua: **Pachakutiq** Inka Yupanki)
- "~ the Ecclesiastic" or "~ the Priest": **Martin I of Aragon** (Catalan: Martí **l'Eclesiàstic**; Spanish: "Martín **el Eclesiástico**" o "**el Cura**")
- "~ the Edifier": **Peter III of Portugal** (Portuguese: Pedro **o Edificador**)
- "~ the Educator": **Maria II of Portugal** (Portuguese: Maria **a Educadora**)
- "~ the Elbow-High" or "The Ell-High": **Władysław I of Poland** (Polish: Władysław I **Łokietek**)
- "~ the Elder":
  - **Eadweard I of England** (Old English: Ēadweard **se Ieldra**?)
  - **Martin I of Aragon**
  - **Tarquin I** (Latin: Tarquinius **Senior**)
  - **Mircea I of Wallachia** (Romanian: Mircea cel **Bătrân**)
  - **Boso III of Turin**
- "~ the Eloquent": **Edward of Portugal** (Portuguese: Duarte **o Eloquente**)
- "~ the Emperor-King": **Charles V, Holy Roman Emperor**
- "~ the Emperor-Sacristan": **Joseph II of Austria**
- "~ of the Empty Pockets": **Frederick IV of Austria** (German: Friedrich **mit der leeren Tasche**)
- "~ the Enabler": **Peter III of Portugal**
- "~ the Enemy-Son": **Peter I of Portugal** (Portuguese: Pedro **o Filho-Inimigo**)
- "~ the Enlightened": **Charles III of Spain** (Spanish: Carlos **el Ilustrado**)
- "~ Epiphanes" (Greek "the manifest"): several Hellenistic kings, including
  - **Ptolemy V Epiphanes**
- "~ Euergetes" (Greek "the benefactor"): several Hellenistic kings, including
  - **Ptolemy III Euergetes**
  - **Ptolemy VIII Physcon**
- "~ Eupator" (Greek "of noble father"):
  - **Antiochus V** (Greek: Αντίοχος **Ευπάτωρ**)
  - **Mithridates VI of Pontus** (Greek: Μιθριδάτης **Ευπάτωρ**)
  - **Ptolemy Eupator**
- "~ the Executioner": **Mehmed I of the Ottoman Empire** (Turkish: Mehmed I **Kirişçi**)
- "~ the Exile":
  - **Władysław II the Exile** (Polish: Władysław **Wygnaniec**')
  - **Edward the Exile**

=== F ===
- "~ the Fair":
  - **Charles IV of France** (French: Charles **le Bel**)
  - **Donald III of Scotland** (Scottish Gaelic: Domnall **Bán**)
  - **Geoffrey V, Count of Anjou** (French: Geoffroy **le Bel**)
  - **Ivan II of Moscow** (Russian: Иван **Красный**)
  - **Leopold II, Margrave of Austria** (German: Luitpold **der Heilige**)
  - **Louis I of France** (French: Louis **le Débonnaire**)
  - **Philip IV of France** (French: Philippe **le Bel**)
  - **Philip I of Castile** (Philip the Fair, Spanish: Felipe **el Hermoso**, French: Philippe **le Beau**)
- "~ Fairhair": **Harald I of Norway** (Old Norse: Haraldr **inn hárfagri**)
- "~ the Fair Sun": **Vladimir I of Kiev** (Ukrainian: Володимир **Красне Сонечко**)
- "Farmer ~": **George III Great Britain**
- "~ the Farmer": **Denis of Portugal** (Portuguese: Dinis **o Lavrador**)
- "~ The Swift(?): **Eystein Halfdansson of Romerike and Vestfold** (Old Norse: Eysteinn **Fret**)
- "~ the Fat":
  - **Afonso II of Portugal** (Portuguese: Afonso **o Gordo**)
  - **Charles III, Holy Roman Emperor** (French: Charles **le Gros**)
  - **Conan III, Duke of Brittany** (French: Conan III **le Gros**)
  - **Henry I of Cyprus** (French: Henri **le Gros**)
  - **Henry I of Navarre** (French: Henri **le Gros**; Spanish: Enrique **el Gordo**)
  - **Louis VI of France** (French: Louis **le Gros**)
  - **Ptolemy VIII of Ptolemaic Egypt**
  - **Sancho I of León**
- "~ the Fearless": **John the Fearless** (French: Jean **sans Peur**)
- "~ the Frank": **Alfonso III of Aragon** (Catalan: Alfons **el Franc**; Spanish: Alfonso **el Franco**; also known as Alfonso the Liberal or Alfonso the Free)
- "~ the Fighter": **Anthony I of Portugal** (Portuguese: António **o Lutador**)
- "~ First-Crowned": **Stefan of Raška** (Serbian: Стефан **Првовенчани**)
- "~ Fitzempress": **Henry II of England**
- "~ Flatnose": **Ketil of Man** (Old Norse: Ketil **Flatnef**)
- "~ Forkbeard": **Sweyn I of Denmark** (Old Norse: Svend **Tjugeskæg** or Svend **Tyvskæg**; Old English: Sweyn **Forcbeard**)
- "~ the Fortunate":
  - **Manuel I of Portugal** (Portuguese: Manuel O Venturoso)
  - **Dietrich of Oldenburg** (Latin: Teudericus **Fortunatus**)
  - **Philip VI of France** (French: Philippe **le Fortuné**)
- "~ the Founder": **Afonso I of Portugal** (Portuguese: Afonso **o Fundador**)
- "~ the Fowler": **Henry I of Germany** (German: Heinrich **der Vogler** or Heinrich **der Finkler**)
- "~ the Fratricide":
  - **Berengar Raymond II, Count of Barcelona** (Catalan: Berenguer Ramon **el Fratricida**)
  - **Francis I of Brittany**
  - **Henry II of Castile** (Spanish: Enrique **el Fratricida**)
- "~ From Overseas": **Louis IV of France** (French: Louis **d'Outremer**)

=== G ===
- "~ the Generous" or "~ the Liberal":
  - **Alfonso III of Aragon** (Catalan: Alfons **el Liberal**; Spanish: Alfonso **el Liberal**)
  - **Boleslaus II of Poland** (Polish: Bolesław **Szczodry**)
  - **Leopold, Duke of Bavaria** (German: Luitpold **der Freigiebige**)
- "~ the Gentle":
  - **Rupert of Germany**
  - **Frederick II, Elector of Saxony** (German: Friedrich **der Sanftmütige**)
  - **Harald III of Denmark** (Old Norse: Harald **Hen**); see also **"~ Hen"** below
- "~ the German": **Louis I of the East Franks** (French: Louis **le Germanique**)
- "~ the Glorious":
  - **Athelstan of England** (Old English: Æþelstan, **ætniman**)
  - **Elizabeth I of England** (**Gloriana**)
  - **Leopold VI, Duke of Austria** (German: Luitpold **der Glorreiche**)
- ""~the God-Given": **Louis XIV** (French: Louis **le Dieu-Donné**)
- "~ the God-Like One": **Murad I, Ottoman Emperor** (Turkish: Murat **Hüdavendigar**)
- "~ the God-Loving": **Andrey I Bogolubsky** (Russian: Андрей **Боголюбский**)
- "~ the Good":
  - **Alfonso IV of Aragon** (Catalan: Alfons **el Benigne**; Aragonese: Alifonso **o Beninno**; Spanish: Alfonso **el Benigno**)
  - **Alexandru of Moldavia** (Romanian: Alexandru **cel Bun**)
  - **Fulk II of Anjou** (French: Foulques **le Bon**?)
  - **Hywel ap Cadell of Wales** (Welsh: Hywel **Dda**)
  - **Haakon I of Norway** (Old Norse: Hákon **góði**)
  - **John I of Portugal** (Portuguese: João **o Bom**)
  - **John II of France** (French: Jean **le Bon**)
  - **Louis I of Holland** (Dutch: Lodewijk **de Goede**)
  - **Magnus I of Norway** (Old Norse: Magnus **den Gode**)
  - **Philip III of Burgundy** (French: Philippe **le Bon**)
  - **William II of Sicily** (Italian: Guglielmo **il Buono**)
- "Good King ~":
  - **Edward III of England** (**Good King** Edward)
  - **Henry IV of France** (**Bon Roi** Henri)
  - **René of Two Sicilies** (then deposed, remained duke of Anjou and count of Provence) (French: le **bon roi** René)
  - **Wenceslas I of Bohemia** (**Good King** Wenceslas)
- "Good Queen ~": **Elizabeth I of England** (**Good Queen** Bess)
- "~ of Good Memory" or "~ the One with Good Memory": **John I of Portugal** (Portuguese: João **o de Boa Memória**)
- "~ the Good Mother": **Maria II of Portugal** (Portuguese: Maria **a Boa Mãe**)
- "~ the Gouty":
  - **Piero I de Medici of Florence** (Italian: Piero **il Gottoso**)
  - **Bermudo II of León** (Spanish: Bermudo **el Gotoso**)
- "~ the Great": see List of people known as The Great
- "the Great Elector": **Frederick William I, Elector of Brandenburg** (German: **Großer Kurfürst**)
- "~ Greyfell" or "~ Greyhide": **Harald II of Norway** (Old Norse: Haraldr **gráfeldr**)
- "~ Greymantle": **Geoffrey I of Anjou** (French: Geoffroy **Grisegonelle**)
- "~ the Grim" or "~ the Brave" or "~ the Inexorable": **Selim I of the Ottoman Empire** (Turkish: **Yavuz** Sultan Selim)
- "~ the Grocer-King" or "~ the Spices-King": **Manuel I of Portugal** (Portuguese: Manuel **O Rei-Merceeiro**, Portuguese: Manuel **O Rei das Especiarias** and French: Emmanuel **Le Roi-Épicier**), a nickname given to him by Francis I of France with a double entendre, as the French word épicier refers to a grocer, and is derived from épice, "spice")
- "~ Gylle": (Old Norse, "Servant"): Harald IV of Norway

=== H ===
- "~ the Hairy": **Wilfred I of Urgel**
- "~ the Hammer":
  - **Charles Martel of the Franks**
  - **Geoffrey II of Anjou**
  - **Geoffrey IV of Anjou**
- "~ The Hammer of the Scots": **Edward I of England** (see also Longshanks below).
- "~ the Handsome":
  - **Ferdinand I of Portugal** (Portuguese: Fernando **o Formoso**)
  - **Frederick I of Austria**
  - **John II Komnenos, Byzantine Emperor** (Greek: Καλο **ϊωάννης**)
  - **Philip IV of France** (French: Philippe **le Bel**)
  - **Philip I of Spain** (Spanish: Felipe **el Hermoso**)
  - **Radu of Wallachia** (Romanian: **cel Frumos**)
- "~ the Hardy": **Canute III of Denmark** (Old Norse: **Harde**knud; Old English: **Hartha**cnut)
- "~ Hardrada" (from Old Norse "Harðráði", "Stern Counsel"): **Harald III of Norway**
- "~ Harefoot": **Harold I of England**
- "~ the Hero of Two Worlds" (Portuguese: D. Pedro, **o Herói de Dois Mundos**): **Peter I of Brazil & IV of Portugal**
- "~ the Hidden": **Sebastian of Portugal** (Portuguese: Sebastião **o Encoberto**)
- "~ the Holy":
  - **Canute IV of Denmark**
  - **Eric IX of Sweden**
  - **Olaf II of Norway**
- "~ the Holy Prince": **Ferdinand of Portugal** (Portuguese: Fernando **o Infante Santo**)
- "~ the Hopeful": **Peter V of Portugal** (Portuguese: Pedro **o Esperançoso**)
- "~ the Hunchback": **Pippin the Hunchback**
- "~ the Humane" or "~ the Humanist": **Martin I of Aragon**
- "~ Hunger": **Olaf I of Denmark**
- "~ the Hunter":
  - **Gudrød**
  - **John I of Aragon** (Spanish: Juan **el Cazador**; Catalan: Joan **el Caçador**)
  - **Mehmed IV of the Ottoman Empire** (Ottoman Turkish: **Avcı** Mehmed)
- "~ the Hunter-King":
  - **Charles I of Portugal** (Portuguese: Carlos I, **o Rei-Caçador**)

=== I ===
- "~ the Idle": **Wenceslaus IV of Bohemia** (German: Wenzel **der Faule**)
- "~ the Ill-Tempered": **Fulk IV of Anjou**
- "~ the Illustrious":
  - **Otto II, Duke of Bavaria** (German: Otto **der Erlauchte**)
  - **Otto I, Duke of Saxony** (German: Otto **der Erlauchte**)
  - **Henry III, Margrave of Meissen** (German: Heinrich **der Erlauchte**)
  - **Leopold I, Margrave of Austria** (German: Luitpold **der Erlauchte**)
- "~ the Impaler": **Vlad III of Wallachia**
- "~ the Impotent" **Henry IV of Castile** (Spanish: Enrique **el Impotente**)
- "~ the Inconstant" or "~ the Fickle": **Ferdinand I of Portugal** (Portuguese: Fernando **o Inconstante**)
- "~ the Indolent": **Louis V of France**
- "~ the Independentist": **Anthony I of Portugal** (Portuguese: António **o Independentista**)
- "~ the Invincible": **Demetrius I of Bactria**
- "~ the Iron":
  - **Ernest of Austria** (German: Ernest **der Eiserne**)
  - **Louis II, Landgrave of Thuringia** (German: Ludwig **der Eiserne**)
  - **Henry II, Landgrave of Hesse** (German: Heinrich **der Eiserne**)
  - **Henry II, Count of Holstein-Rendsburg** (German: Heinrich **der Eiserne**)
  - **Henry III, Duke of Żagań** (German: Heinrich **der Eiserne**; Polish: Henryk **Żelazny**)
  - **Frederick II, Elector of Brandenburg** (German: Friedrich **der Eiserne**)
- "~ Ironside":
  - **Edmund II of England**
  - **Björn Ironside**

=== J ===
- "~ the Just":
  - **Casimir II, Duke of Poland (**Polish: Kazimierz II **Sprawiedliwy**)
  - **Ferdinand VI of Spain** (Spanish: Fernando **el Justo**)
  - **James II of Aragon** (Spanish: Jaime **el Justo**)
  - **Leopold III, Duke of Austria** (German: Leopold **der Gerechte**)
  - **Louis XIII of France**
  - **Matthias I of Hungary**
  - **Peter I of Portugal** (Spanish: Pedro **o Justo**)
  - **Bayezid II, Sultan of the Ottoman Empire**

=== K ===
- "~ the Kind":
  - **Alexandru of Moldavia**
  - **Alfonso IV of Aragon**
- "~ the Kind-Hearted": **Eric I of Denmark**
- "~ the Khazar" (Gr. Chozar): **Leo IV of the Byzantine Empire**

=== L ===
- "~ Lackland":
  - **John, King of England** (French: Jean **sans Terre**)
  - **John, Count of Eu** (French: Jean **sans Terre**)
  - **Henry I, Margrave of Brandenburg-Stendal** (German: Heinrich **ohne Land**)
- "~ the Lamb": **Eric III of Denmark**
- "~ the Lame":
  - Timur (Persian: Timur **i-Lang**)
  - **Sigobert King of the Ripuarian Franks**
  - See also under "the Lisp and Lame" below
- "~ the Last":
  - **Llywelyn ap Gruffudd of Wales** (Welsh: Llywelyn **Ein Llyw Olaf**)
  - **Louis XVI of France** (French: Louis **le Dernier**)
- "~ Law-Mender": **Magnus VI of Norway**
- "~ the Lawgiver":
  - **Eric IX of Sweden**
  - **Henry II of England**
  - **Magnus VI of Norway**
  - **Süleyman I of the Ottoman Empire** (Ottoman Turkish: انونى سلطان سليمان, **Kanuni** Sultan Süleyman)
- "~ the Learned": **Alfonso X of Castile**
- "~ the Leprous": **Afonso II of Portugal** (Portuguese: Afonso **o Gafo**)
- "~ the Liberal":
  - **Alfonso III of Aragon**
  - **Edward of Savoy**
  - **Henry I of Champagne**
- "~ the Liberator":
  - **Alexander II of Russia**
  - **Pedro I of Brazil and IV of Portugal** (Portuguese: Pedro **o Libertador**)
- "~ the Lion":
  - **Albert II of Mecklenburg**
  - **Brian Boruma of Ireland**
  - **Heinrich II, Lord of Mecklenburg**
  - **Henry III, Duke of Saxony**
  - **Louis VIII of France** (French: Louis **le Lion**)
  - **William I of Scotland** (Mediaeval Gaelic: Uilliam mac Eanric)
  - **Richard I of England** (French: Richard **le Lion**)
- "~ the Lionheart": **Richard I of England** (French: Richard **Cœur de Lion**)
- "~ the Lisp and Lame" **Eric XI of Sweden** (Swedish: Erik **läspe och halte**)
- "~ the Little Impaler": **Basarab Ţepeluş cel Tânăr of Wallachia** (Romanian: Basarab **Ţepeluş**)
- "~ (the) Longhaired (king)": **Chlodio**
- "~ Longshanks": **Edward I of England**
- "~ the Lover of Elegance": **John I of Aragon** (Catalan: Joan **l'Amador de la Gentilesa**; Spanish: Juan **el Amador de la gentileza**)

=== M ===
- "~ the Mad":
  - **Charles VI of France** (French: Charles **le fol**)
  - **Ibrahim of the Ottoman Empire** (Turkish: **Deli** İbrahim)
  - **Joanna of Castile** (Spanish: Juana **la Loca**)
  - **Ludwig II of Bavaria**
  - **Maria I of Portugal** (Portuguese: Maria **a Louca**)
- "~ the Madman": **Donald II of Scotland** (Scottish Gaelic: Dòmhnall **Dásachtach**)
- "~ the Magnanimous":
  - Emperor **Pedro II of Brazil** (Portuguese: Pedro **o Magnânimo**)
  - King **Alfonso V of Aragon** (Catalan: Alfons **el Magnànim**)
  - **John Frederick I, Elector of Saxony** (German: Johann Friedrich **der Großmütige**)
  - **Otto Henry, Elector Palatine** (German: Ottheinrich **der Großmütige**)
  - King **John V of Portugal** (Portuguese: João **o Magnânimo**)
  - Landgrave **Philipp I of Hesse**
  - King **Ladislaus of Naples**
  - **Inca Roca** (Quechua: Inka **Roq'a**)
  - **Charles II of Alençon** (French: Charles **le Magnanime**)
- "~ the Magnificent":
  - **Amenhotep III**, Pharaoh of Egypt
  - **Edmund I of England** (Old English: Eadmund **Glenglic**)
  - **Lorenzo de' Medici** (Italian: Lorenzo **il Magnifico**)
  - **Robert I of Normandy** (French: Robert **le Magnifique**)
  - **Suleiman I of the Ottoman Empire**
  - **Thomas de Berkeley, 5th Baron Berkeley**
- "~ the Maiden":
  - **Eystein of Norway**
  - **Malcolm IV of Scotland**
- "~ Martel" (Old French, "The Hammer"):
  - **Charles Martel of the Franks**
  - **Geoffrey II of Anjou**
  - **Geoffrey IV of Anjou**
- "~ the Man": **John II of Portugal** (Spanish: Juan **el Hombre**, a nickname given to him by Isabella of Castile)
- "~ the Martyr":
  - **Edward the Martyr of England**
  - **King Charles I of England**
  - **Charles I of Portugal** (Portuguese: **o Martirizado**)
  - **Nicholas II of Russia**
- "~ the Master of Avis": **John I of Portugal** (Portuguese: João **o Mestre de Avis**, a reference to his position as Master of the Order of Avis before his election as King)
- "~ the Memorable": **Eric II of Denmark**
- "~ the Merry": **Charles II of England**
- "~ the Mild": **Halfdan of Romerike and Vestfold**
- "~ the Middle": **Pippin of Herstal**
- "~ the Mighty": **Stephen Uroš IV Dušan of Serbia**
- "~ Minus-a-Quarter": **Michael VII Dukas, Byzantine Emperor**
- "~ Moneybags": **Ivan I of Russia**
- "~ the Monk":
  - **Alfonso IV of Leon**
  - **Fortun I of Pamplona**
  - **Ramiro II of Aragon**
  - **Vlad IV of Wallachia**
- "~ Monk's-Cloak"?: **Jon Kuvlung of Norway**
- "~ Monomakh" (Russian "Мономах", from Greek "Μονομαχος", "One who fights alone"): **Vladimir Monomakh of Kiev**
- "~ Monomakhos" (from Greek "Μονομαχος", "One who fights alone"): **Constantine IX, Byzantine Emperor**
- "~ the Moor":
  - **Albert II Malaspina, Marquis of Malaspina** (Italian: Alberto **il Moro**)
  - **Ludovico Sforza, Duke of Milan** (Italian: Ludovico **il Moro**)
  - **Alessandro de' Medici, Duke of Florence** (Italian: Alessandro **il Moro**)
- "the Most Beautiful ~": **Maria of Portugal, Queen of Castile** (Portuguese: **Fermosíssima** Maria)
- "Mother ~": **Menelik II of Ethiopia** (Amharic: እምዬ ምኒልክ **imiyē** Minīlik
- "~ the Missed-King": **Manuel II of Portugal** (Portuguese: Manuel **o Rei-Saudade**)
- "~ the Mouth": **Sigurd II of Norway** (Old Norse: Sigurðr **munnr**)
- "~ the Musician-King:
  - **John IV of Portugal** (Portuguese: João IV, **o Rei-Músico**)
  - **Louis I of Portugal** (Portuguese: Luís I, **o Rei-Músico**)

=== N ===
- "~ the Navigator": **Henry of Portugal**
- "~ New-Day": **Valdemar IV of Denmark**
- "~ of the Nine Hostages" (Irish: **Noigíallach**): **Niall Noigíallach**
- "~ the Noble":
  - **Charles III of Navarre**
  - **Magnus I of Norway**
- "~ No-Counsel" or "~ the Unready": **Ethelred II of England** (Old English: Æþelræd **Unræd**; Middle English: Ethelred **the Redeless**)
- "~ the Noisy" or "~ the Clatterer": Eystein the Noisy (Modern Norwegian: Øystein Glumra) was reputedly a petty king on the west coast of Norway
- "~ the Nun's-Lover" (Portuguese: D. João, **o Freirático**): **John V of Portugal**

=== O ===
- "The Oath-Taker": **Henry III of Reuss** (1337–1378)
- "The Oberhofrichter": **Henry of Reuss-Plauen** (1271–1303)
- "The Oceanographer":
  - **Albert I, Prince of Monaco**
  - **Charles I of Portugal** (Portuguese: Carlos **o oceanógrafo**)
- "~ The Old" (Cat. el Vell, Fr. l'Ancien, le Vieux, Nor. den Gamle, Pol. Stary, Rum. cel Batran, Sp. el Velloso, Swe. den Gamle, Tgl. Matanda):
  - **Ache of Luzon** (c. 1480–1572)
  - **Albert I of Carpi**
  - **Albert II of Wedenberg-Heiligenberg** (1327–1370)
  - **Arnulf I, Count of Flanders** (also known as "the great"
  - **Basarab Laiota, Prince of Wallachia**
  - **Boso I, Count of La Marche**
  - **Coel Hen** (Welsh for "Coel the Old"; king of the Brittonic "Hen Ogledd" ("Old North"); possibly legendary)
  - **Konrad III of Silesia** (Polish: Konrad III **Stary**)
  - **Dyfnwal Hen** (Welsh for "Dyfnwal the Old") of Alt Clut
  - **Emund II of Sweden**
  - **Eric I, Duke of Brunswick-Lüneburg**, 1495–1540
  - **Frederick the Great (Prussia)**, also named "the Old Fritz" (German: der Alte Fritz)
  - **George V, Count of Nassau-Dillenburg**, 1620–1623
  - **Gorm of Denmark**
  - **Guthrum**
  - **Haakon IV of Norway**
  - **Hugh VIII, Lord of Lusignan** (French: Hughes **le Vieux**)
  - **Igor of Kiev**
  - **Michael II of Beloozero** (1432–1486)
  - **Mieszko III of Poland**
  - **Pippin of Landen**
  - **Raymond VI of Toulouse**
  - **Raymond Berengar I, Count of Barcelona**
  - **Rudolph II, Count of Habsburg** (died 1232); also "the Kind"
  - **Sigismund I of Poland**
  - **Theodore II of Beloozero** (13??-1380)
  - **William, Count of Nassau**, 1538–1559
- "The Old Dessauer": Leopold I of Anhalt-Dessau
- "The One-Eyed" (Ger. der Einaugige):
  - **John II, Count of Holstein-Kiel**
  - **William I, Margrave of Meissen**
- "~ the One-Eyed":
  - **Fortun I of Pamplona**
  - **Antigonus I Monophthalmus**
  - **Wenceslaus I of Bohemia**
  - **Raymond IV, Count of Toulouse**
- "The Oppressed": Dietrich, Margrave of Meissen (German: Dietrich der **Bedrängte**)
- "~ the Oppressor": **Philip IV of Spain** (in Portugal: Portuguese: Filipe **o Opressor**)
- "The Orphan": **Henry I of Reuss** (1250–1295)
- "~ the Outlaw": **Edgar Ætheling of England**
- "~ d'Outremer" (French, "from Overseas"): **Louis IV of France**

=== P ===
- "~ the Pacific": **Peter II of Portugal** (Portuguese: Pedro **o Pacífico**)
- "~ the Painter-King":
  - **Charles I of Portugal** (Portuguese: Carlos, **o Rei-Pintor**)
  - **Louis I of Portugal** (Portuguese: Luís, **o Rei-Pintor**)
- "~ the Pale": **Constantius I, Roman Emperor**
- "~ the Patriot": **Manuel II of Portugal** (Portuguese: Manuel **o Patriota**)
- "~ the Peaceful":
  - **Edgar of England**
  - **Olaf III of Norway**
  - **Aymon, Count of Savoy**
  - **Amadeus VIII, Duke of Savoy**
- "~ the Peacemaker":
  - **Alexander III of Russia**
  - **Alfonso XII of Spain** (Spanish: Alfonso **el Pacificador**)
- "~ the Perfect Prince": **John II of Portugal** (Portuguese: João **o Príncipe Perfeito**)
- "~ the Philosopher" or "~ the Philosopher King": **Edward of Portugal** (Portuguese: Duarte **o Filósofo** or **o Rei-Filósofo**)
- "~ the Pilgrim:
  - **Ermengol II, Count of Urgell** (Catalan: Ermengol **el Pelegrí**) (Spanish: Armengol **el Peregrino**)
  - **Henry I, Lord of Mecklenburg** (German: Heinrich **der Pilger**)
- "~ the Pious":
  - **Boleslav II of Bohemia**
  - **Edward VI, King of England**
  - **Henry II, Duke of Silesia** (Polish: Henryk **Pobożny**)
  - **John III of Portugal** (Portuguese: João **o Piedoso**)
  - **Louis I of France** (French: Louis **le Pieux**)
  - **Maria I of Portugal** (Portuguese: Maria **a Pia**)
  - **Philip III of Spain** (Spanish: Felipe **el Piadoso**)
  - **Robert II of France** (French: Robert **le Pieux**)
  - **Sancho II of Portugal** (Portuguese: Sancho **o Pio**)
  - **William V, Duke of Bavaria** (German: Wilhelm **der Fromme**)
  - **Otto III, Margrave of Brandenburg** (German: Otto **der Fromme**)
- "~ Ploughpenny": **Eric IV of Denmark**
- "~ the Poet" or "~ the Poet King": **Denis of Portugal** (Portuguese: Dinis **o Poeta** or Portuguese: Dinis **o Rei Poeta**)
- "The Poet Prince": **Hywel ab Owain Gwynedd**
- "~ the Poison King": **Mithridates VI of Pontus**
- "~ the Popular": **Louis I of Portugal** (Portuguese: Luís **o Popular**)
- "~ the Populator": **Sancho I of Portugal** (Portuguese: Sancho **o Povoador**)
- "~ the Posthumous":
  - **John I of France**
  - **Ladislaus I of Bohemia**
  - **Theobald IV of Champagne**
- "~ the Powerful": **Uroš IV of Serbia**
- "~ the Precious": **Stephen II of Serbia**
- "~ the Priest Hater": **Eric II of Norway**
- "~ the Prior of Crato": **Anthony I of Portugal** (Portuguese: António **o Prior do Crato**, a reference to his position as Master of the Portuguese branch of the Order of the Knights of St. John of Jerusalem (Hospitaller) before his acclamation as King)
- "~ the Proud":
  - **Simeon of Moscow**
  - **Tarquin the Proud** (Latin: Lucius Tarquinius **Superbus**)
- "~ the Prudent":
  - **Louis XI of France** (French: Louis **le Prudent**)
  - **Philip II of Spain** (Spanish: Felipe **el Prudente**)
- "~ the Purple-Born" (Greek Porphyrogenetes):
  - **Baldwin II of Constantinople**
  - **Constantine VII, Byzantine Emperor**

=== Q ===
- "~ the Quarreller":
  - **Frederick of Saxony**
  - **Louis X of France**
- "~ the Queen of Sad Mischance": **Isabella II of Spain** (Spanish: Isabel II **la de los Tristes Destinos**)
- "~ the Quiet": **Olaf III of Norway**
- "~ the Quietest one": **Alexis of Russia** (Russian: Алексей **Тишайший**, Alexei **Tishayshy**)

=== R ===
- "~ the Rash": **James III of Majorca**
- "~ the Red":
  - **Håkan of Sweden** (Swedish: Håkan **Röde**)
  - **Fulk I of Anjou**
  - **John I, Duke of Brittany**
  - **Odo I, Duke of Burgundy** (French: Eudes **le Roux**)
  - **Otto II, Holy Roman Emperor**
  - **William II of England** (Latin: William **Rufus**)
  - **Rupert I, Elector Palatine** (German: Ruprecht **der Rote**)
  - **Ralph I, Count of Clermont** (French: Raoul **le Roux**)
- "~ the Red King": **Macbeth of Scotland** (Medieval Gaelic: Mac Bethad mac Findlaích **Rí Deircc**)
- "~ the Redemptress": **Isabel of Brazil** (Portuguese: Isabel **a Redentora**)
- "~ the Redless" or "~ the Redeless": **Ethelred II of England** (Old English: Æthelred **Unræd**)
- "~ the Reformer": **Joseph I of Portugal** (Portuguese: José **o Reformador**)
- "~ the Resistant": **Anthony I of Portugal** (Portuguese: António **o Resistente**)
- "~ the Restorer":
  - **Casimir I of Poland** (Polish: Kazimierz **Odnowiciel**)
  - **García Ramírez of Navarre**
  - **Mehmed I of the Ottoman Empire**
  - **John IV of Portugal** (Portuguese: João **o Restaurador**)
- "~ the Righteous":
  - **Rupert of Germany** (German: Ruprecht **der Gerechte**)
  - **Henry IV of Silesia** (Polish: Henryk **Prawy**) (German: Heinrich **der Gerechte**)
  - **Frederick IV, Elector Palatine** (German: Friedrich **der Aufrichtige**)
- "~ the Rightly Guided": **Harun al-Rashid** (Arabic: هَارُون **الرَشِيد**)
- "~ the Romanslayer": **Kaloyan** (Bulgarian: Калоян **ромеубиеца**)
- "~ Roundhead": **Ragnvald of Sweden** (Swedish: Ragnvald **Knaphövde**; the exact meaning of the nickname is unclear)

=== S ===
- "~ the Sacrificer": **Sweyn of Sweden** (Swedish: **Blot**-Sven; unclear if "Sven" was his actual name or part of the nickname)
- "~ the Sacristan": **Peter III of Portugal** (Portuguese: Pedro **o Sacristão**)
- "~ the Sailor King": **William IV of the United Kingdom**
- "~ the Saint":
  - Edward the Confessor, also known as **Saint Edward**
  - **Ferdinand III of Castile** (Spanish: Fernando **el Santo**)
  - **Lulach of Scotland**
  - **Louis IX of France** (French: **Saint** Louis)
  - **William X, Duke of Aquitaine**
  - **Leopold III, Margrave of Austria** (German: Luitpold **der Heilige**)
  - **Louis IV, Landgrave of Thuringia** (German: Ludwig **der Heilige**)
  - **Raymond Benergar IV, Count of Barcelona** (Catalan: Ramon Berenguer **el Sant**)
- "~ the Sapient": **Mindaugas**
- "~ the Saver of Europe": **Tervel of Bulgaria**
- "~ the Savior":
  - **Ptolemy I Soter**
  - **Ptolemy IX Soter**
  - **Antiochus I Soter**
  - **Demetrius I Soter**
  - **Diodotus I Soter**
  - **Menander I Soter**
- "~ the Seer": **Oleg of Novgorod**
- "~ of the Seven Parts (of the World)": **Peter, Duke of Coimbra** (Portuguese: Pedro **das Sete Partidas (do Mundo)**)
- "~ the She-Wolf of France: **Isabella of France**
- "~ the Be-shitten": **James II of England and Ireland**, also James VII of Scotland (Scottish Gaelic: Séamus **a' Cháca**)
- "~ the Short": **Pippin III, King of the Franks**
- "~ of Showers": **Niall Frossach**, High King of Ireland
- "~ the Silent":
  - **Olav III of Norway**
  - **William I of Orange**
- "~ the Simple":
  - **Charles III of France**
  - **William, Count of Sully**
  - **Frederick III of Sicily**
  - **Peter II, Duke of Brittany**
- "~ the Singer": **David III of Ethiopia** (Amharic: ዳዊት አዝማሪ Dawīt **āzimarī**)
- "~ Skötkonung" (Old Norse "Tax-King"?): **Olof of Sweden**
- "~ the Sluggard": **Louis V of France**
- "~ the Soldier": **Victor Emmanuel III of Italy**
- "~ the Soldier-King":
  - **Frederick William I of Prussia**
  - **Peter IV of Portugal** (Portuguese: Pedro **o Rei-Soldado**)
  - **Albert I of Belgium** (French: le **Roi-Soldat** or le Roi-Chevalier)
- "~ the Sorcerer": **Vseslav of Polotsk**
- "~ the Sorrowful": **Manuel II of Portugal** (Portuguese: Manuel **o Desventurado**)
- "~ the Spider": **Louis XI of France** (l'Universelle Aragne)
- "~ the Spirited": **Philip V of Spain** (Spanish: Felipe **el Animoso**)
- "~ Split-Nose": **Justinian II, Byzantine Emperor**
- "~ the Stammerer": **Louis II of France**
- "~ the Stout": **Olaf II of Norway**
- "The Strict":
  - **Louis II, Duke of Bavaria** (German: Ludwig **der Strenge**)
  - **Boleslaus I, Duke of Jawor** (Polish: Bolko **Srogi**)
  - **Frederick III, Landgrave of Thuringia** (German: Friedrich **der Strenge**)
- "~ the Strong":
  - **Augustus II the Strong**
  - **Magnus Nilsson, Swedish pretender**
  - **Sancho VII of Navarre**
  - **Uroš IV of Serbia**
- "~ the Studious": **Manuel II of Portugal** (Portuguese: Manuel **o Estudioso**)
- "~ the Stutterer": **Peter I of Portugal** (Portuguese: Pedro **o Tartamudo**)
- "~ the Sun King": **Louis XIV of France**
  - "The Portuguese Sun King": **John V of Portugal**

=== T ===
- "~ the Tall":
  - **Canute II of Sweden**
  - **Philip V of France** (Philippe **le Long**)
  - **Stephen of Serbia**
  - **Thorkell of East Anglia**
  - Hasan the Tall (Uzun Hasan)
- "~ the Terrible":
  - **Charles, Duke of Burgundy**
  - **Ivan IV of Russia** (Russian: Иван **Грозный**, Ivan **Groznyy**)
  - **Shingas**
  - **Krum of Bulgaria**
- "~ the Theologian": **John I of Mecklenburg**
- "~ the Thunderbolt":
  - **Bayezid I, Ottoman Sultan**
  - **Ptolemy, King of Macedon** (Greek: Πτολεμαῖος **Κεραυνός**, romanized: Ptolemaîos **Keraunós**
- "~ the Till-the-End-of-the-World-Passionate": **Peter I of Portugal** (Portuguese: Pedro **o Até-ao-Fim-do-Mundo-Apaixonado**)
- "~ the Tough": **Helen of Bosnia** (Serbo-Croatian Latin: Jelena Gruba)
- "~ the Traditionalist": **Miguel I of Portugal** (Portuguese: Miguel **o Tradicionalista**)
- "~ the Traditional Queen": **Isabella II of Spain** (Spanish: Isabel II **la Reina Castiza**)
- "~ Transmarinus": (Latin: transmarinus "from Outerseas") **Louis IV of France** (French: Louis **d'Outremer**)
- "~ the Treacherous": **Leonor Telles de Meneses** (Portuguese: Leonor Telles de Meneses **a Aleivosa**)
- "~ the Tremulous": **García Sánchez II of Pamplona**
- "~ of the Tributes": **Brian Boru**, High King of Ireland (Irish: Brian **Borúma**)
- "~ the Troubadour":
  - **Alfonso II of Aragon**
  - **Dinis of Portugal** (Portuguese: Dinis **o Trovador**)
  - **Theobald I of Navarre** (French: Thibault **le Trouvère**; Spanish: Teobaldo **el Trovador**; also called Theobald the Posthumous)
- "~ Twistedbeard": **Alan II, Duke of Brittany** (French: Alain **Barbetorte**) (Breton: Alan **Varvek**)
- "~ the Tyrant":
  - **Christian II of Denmark** (in Sweden: Swedish: Kristian **Tyrann**)
  - **Ezzelino III, Lord of Romano** (Italian: Ezzelino **il Tiranno**)

=== U ===
- "~ the Unfortunate":
  - **Manuel II of Portugal** (Portuguese: Manuel **o Desventurado**)
  - **Piero the Unfortunate**
- "~ the Unique": **Frederick II of Prussia**
- "~ the Unlucky":
  - **Arnulf III of Flanders**
  - **Henry III of Reuss**
- "~ the Unready": **Ethelred II of England**
- "~ the Usurper":
  - **Mauregato of Asturias**
  - **Miguel I of Portugal** (Portuguese: Miguel **o Usurpador**)

=== V ===
- "~ the Vain": **James I of England** (VI of Scots)
- "~ the Valiant":
  - **Halfdan Haraldsson**, Legendary Prince of Scania
  - **John IV, Duke of Brittany** (French: Jean **le Vaillant**), (John V in some English sources)
  - **Ralph I, Count of Vermandois** (French: Raoul **le Vaillant**)
  - **Theodoric II, Duke of Lorraine** (French: Thierry **le Vaillant**)
  - **Rudolph, Duke of Lorraine** (French: Raoul **le Vaillant**)
- "~ the Venetian": **Andrew III of Hungary** (& III of Croatia)
- "~ the Vengeful": **Peter I of Portugal** (Portuguese: Pedro **o Vingativo**)
- "~ the Victorious":
  - **Afonso VI of Portugal** (Portuguese: Afonso **o Vitorioso**)
  - **Charles VII of France**
  - **Eric of Sweden** (Swedish: Erik **Segersäll**)
  - **Frederick I of the Palatinate**
  - **Valdemar II of Denmark** (Danish: Valdemar **Sejr**; also "Valdemar the Conqueror")
- "~ the Virgin Queen": **Elizabeth I of England**
- "~the Virtuous": **Leopold V, Duke of Austria** (German: Leopold **der Tugendhafte**)

=== W ===
- "~ the Warlike":
  - **Albert, Prince of Beyreuth**
  - **Bernard VII of Lippe**
  - **Frederick I, Elector of Saxony**
  - **Frederick II of Austria**
  - **Herman of Schwarzenberg**
  - **Michael VI, Byzantine Emperor**
  - **Svyatoslav I of Kiev**
- "~ the Warrior": **Charles I of Savoy**
- "~ the Weak": **Uroš V of Serbia**
- "~ Wearing-a-Cape": **Hugh Capet of France**
- "~ the Well-Beloved":
  - **Charles VI of France**
  - **Louis I of Spain** (Spanish: Luis **el Bien Amado**)
- "~ the Well-Served": **Charles VII of France**
- "~ the Wench of Queluz": **Carlota Joaquina, Queen of Portugal** (Portuguese: Carlota Joaquina **a Megera de Queluz**)
- "~ the White":
  - **Henry III of Silesia**
  - **Leszek I of Poland** (Polish: Leszek **Biały**)
- "~ Whiteshirt":
  - **Haraldr Whiteshirt**
- "~ Who-Fights-Alone":
  - **Constantine IX, Byzantine Emperor**
  - **Vladimir Monomakh of Kiev**
- "~ the Wicked":
  - **Ordoño IV of León**
  - **Yazdegerd I of Persia**
- "~ the Wise":
  - **Albert II of Austria**
  - **Albert IV of Bavaria**
  - **Alfonso X of Castile**
  - **Charles V of France**
  - **Coloman of Hungary**
  - **Frederick II of the Palatinate**
  - **Frederick III, Elector of Saxony**
  - **Leo VI, Byzantine Emperor**
  - **Mandukhai Khatun, empress of the Mongol Empire**
  - **Robert of Naples**
  - **Sancho VI of Navarre**
  - **William IV of Hesse-Kassel (or Hesse-Cassel)**
  - **Yaroslav I of Kiev**Britannica Academic
- "~ the Wrymouth": **Boleslaus III of Poland** (Polish: Bolesław **Krzywousty**)

=== Y ===
- "Yellow ~" or "~ the Blond": **Selim II of the Ottoman Empire** (Turkish: **Sarı** Sultân Selim)
- "~ the Young":
  - **Basarab Ţepeluş of Wallachia** (Old Romanian: Basarab Ţepeluş **cel Tânăr**)
  - **Fulk V of Anjou** (French: Foulque **le Jeune**)
- "~ the Young King": **Henry the Young King** (French: Henri **le Jeune**)
- "~ the Younger":
  - **Conrad II of Sicily**
  - **Martin I of Sicily**
  - **Louis VII of France** (French: Louis **le Jeune**)
  - **Pippin III, King of the Franks** (French: Pépin **le Bref**; German: Pippin **der Kleine**, Pippin **der Kurze**, or Pippin **der Jüngere**); see also "~ the Short", above

== Sobriquets ==
- "The Accursed": **Genghis Khan**
- "The Alexander of the West": **Henry II of England**
- "Alix": **Alexandra of Denmark**
- "Bertie": **George VI of the United Kingdom**
- "Bloody Mary": **Mary I of England**
- "Bonnie Prince Charlie": **Charles Edward Stuart, United Kingdom**
- "Caligula" ("Little Boots"): **Gaius Julius Caesar Germanicus, Roman Emperor**
- "Caracalla" ("Hooded Tunic"): **Marcus Aurelius Antoninus, Roman Emperor**
- "Cecco Peppe" (Italian, diminutive of Francesco Giuseppe): **Franz Joseph I of Austria**
- "Champion of the Reformation": **John Frederick I, Elector of Saxony**
- "Daisy": **Margrethe II of Denmark**
- "Dickie": **Louis Mountbatten**
- "Dominus Mundi": **Henry VI, Holy Roman Emperor**
- "Ducky": **Princess Victoria Melita of Saxe-Coburg and Gotha**
- "the Emperor of Universal Dominion": **Charles V, Holy Roman Emperor**
- "Emperor-Sacristan": **Joseph II, Holy Roman Emperor**
- "Ena": **Victoria Eugenie of Battenberg**
- "Farmer George": **George III the United Kingdom**
- "Father of England" **Edward III of England**
- "Father of Europe" (Latin: "Pater Europae"): **Charlemagne**
- "Father-in-law of Europe":
  - **Christian IX of Denmark**
  - **Nicholas I of Montenegro**
- "The Fairy Tale King" (German: "der Märchenkönig"): **Ludwig II of Bavaria**
- "First Gentleman of Europe": **Louis XV of France**
- "Fox of Mecklenburg": **Albert II of Mecklenburg**
- "Gloriana": **Elizabeth I of England**
- "Good King Edward": **Edward III of England**
- "Good King Henry" (French: "le bon roi Henri"): **Henry IV of France**
- "Good King René" (French: "le bon roi René"): **René of Anjou**, (deposed) king of peninsular Sicily
- "Good Queen Bess": **Elizabeth I of England**
- "Grandfather of Europe": **Miguel I of Portugal**
- "Grandmother of Europe": **Queen Victoria**
- "The Great Belly-Gerent": **Frederick I of Württemberg**
- "The Great Elector" (German: "Großer Kurfürst"): **Frederick William, Elector of Brandenburg**
- "Greek Nicky": **Prince Nicholas of Greece and Denmark**
- "Hammer of the North": **Harald III of Norway**
- "Hammer of the Scots": **Edward I of England**
- "Harry": **Maud of the United Kingdom**
- "The Huckster King": **Henry VII of England**
- "The Iron and Golden King": **Ottokar II of Bohemia** (Czech: "Král železný a zlatý")
- "The Iron Duke": **Fernando Álvarez de Toledo, Duke of Alva** (Dutch: "IJzeren Hertog")
- "The Iron Pope" (Italian: Il Papa Ferreo): **Pope Sixtus V**
- "Kaiser Bill": **Wilhelm II, German Emperor**
- "The King of May" (Italian: "Re di maggio"): **Umberto II of Italy**
- "The King of the Seas" **Edward III of England**
- "The Last Knight": Maximilian I, Holy Roman Emperor
- "Lion of Justice": **Henry I of England**; **Henry II of England**
- "Lilibet": **Elizabeth II of the United Kingdom**
- "Lion of the North": **Gustavus Adolphus of Sweden**
- "The Little Corporal": **Napoleon I of France**
- "Little Sabre" (Italian: "Sciaboletta"): **Victor Emmanuel III of Italy**
- "May": **Mary of Teck**
- "Missy": **Marie of Romania**
- "The Merry Monarch" or "The Merrie Monarch":
  - **Charles II of England**
  - **Kalākaua of Hawaiʻi**
- "Mrs Brown": **Queen Victoria**. Refers to the Queen's relationship with her personal attendant, John Brown.
- "Napoleon of the Pacific": **Kamehameha I of Hawaiʻi**
- "Nicky": **Nicholas II of Russia**
- "The Nine Days Queen": **Lady Jane Grey**
- "Old Coppernose": **Henry VIII of England**
- "The One of the Little Dagger" (Catalan: "El del Punyalet"): **Peter IV of Aragon**
- "The People's King": **Lunalilo of Hawaii**
- "Pingo": **Frederik X of Denmark**
- "The Pious Grandfather" (Italian: Il Pio Nonno, a pun on the Italian form of his regnal name, Pio Nono): **Pope Pius IX**
- "The Priests' King" (German: "Pfaffenkönig", Latin: "rex clericorum"): **Henry Raspe**
- "The Prince of Whales": **George IV of the United Kingdom**. Note that it is **Whales** instead of **Wales**. George was indeed the Prince of Wales during his regency, while he was also quite obese. Political satirical cartoons at the time would make fun of his obesity and portray him as a massive whale.
- "The Sailor King": **William IV of the United Kingdom**
- "The Scourge of God": **Attila the Hun**
- "Skanderbeg" (from Albanian Skënderbeu, "Lord Alexander"): **George Kastrioti of Albania**
- "Sissi/Sisi": **Empress Elisabeth of Austria**
- "Soft-Sword": **John, King of England**
- "Stupid Willy" (Polish: "Głupi Wiluś"): **Wilhelm II of Germany**
- "Stupor Mundi": **Frederick II, Holy Roman Emperor**
- "The Sun King" (French: "Le Roi Soleil"): **Louis XIV of France**
- "The Tennis King": (Swedish: Tenniskungen) **Gustav V of Sweden**
- "The Theater King": (Swedish: Teaterkungen) **Gustav III of Sweden**
- "Thief of Cairo": **Farouk of Egypt**
- "The Uncle of Europe": **Edward VII of the United Kingdom**
- "The Universal Spider" (Old French: "l'universelle aragne"): **Louis XI of France**
- "The Virgin Queen": **Elizabeth I of England**
- "The Warrior King": **Abdullah II of Jordan**
- "The Warrior Pope" (Italian: Il Papa Guerriero): **Pope Julius II**
- "The Winter King": **Frederick I of Bohemia**
- "The Wisest Fool in Christendom": **James I of England**
- "The World-Emperor": **Charles V, Holy Roman Emperor**

== See also ==
- Epithet
- Nickname
- Sobriquet
- Victory titles
- List of people known as the Great
- List of royal saints and martyrs
- List of military figures by nickname
- Lists of nicknames
