= Călugăreni =

Călugăreni may refer to several places in Romania:

- Călugăreni, a commune in Giurgiu County
- Călugăreni, a commune in Prahova County
- Călugăreni, a village in Dămienești Commune, Bacău County
- Călugăreni, a village in Felnac Commune, Arad County
- Călugăreni, a village in Ungureni Commune, Botoşani County
- Călugăreni, a village in Pantelimon Commune, Constanţa County
- Călugăreni, a village in Cobia Commune, Dâmboviţa County
- Călugăreni, a village in Conţeşti Commune, Dâmboviţa County
- Călugăreni, a village in Padeş Commune, Gorj County
- Călugăreni, a village in Mărtiniș Commune, Harghita County
- Călugăreni, a village in Eremitu Commune, Mureș County
- Călugăreni, a village in Poiana Teiului Commune, Neamţ County
- Călugăreni, a village in Adâncata Commune, Suceava County
- Călugăreni, a village in Ştefan cel Mare Commune, Vaslui County
- Călugăreni River
- Călugărenii Noi, Botoșani
- Călugărenii Vechi, Botoșani

== See also ==
- Călugărul River (disambiguation)
- Călugăreasa River (disambiguation)
- Călugărești, a village in Avram Iancu, Alba, Romania
- Călugăreasa, a village in Prigoria, Gorj County, Romania
- Călugăreanu, a surname
- Castra of Călugăreni, a Roman fort in Călugăreni, Mureş
- Battle of Călugăreni, a 1595 battle
