= House of Dănești =

Wallachian noble family

Dănești
- Boyar noble family
- Parent family: House of Basarab
- Country: Wallachia
- Etymology: Dan I
- Founded: 1386
- Founder: Dan I
- Current head: The Uzunov family (Russia, Bulgaria, Romania and Ukraine)
- Final ruler: Moise
- Titles: Vovoide of Wallachia
- Distinctions: Order of the Dragon
- Traditions: Romanian Eastern Orthodoxy
- Estate(s): Bran Castle
- Dissolution: 1530
- Cadet branches: Craiovești

The House of Dănești was the name of one of the two main branches of the Wallachian noble family House of Basarab. They were descended from Dan I of Wallachia. The other lineage of the Basarabs is the House of Drăculești.

== Notable members ==
- Dan I of Wallachia
- Dan II of Wallachia
- Vladislav II of Wallachia
- Dan III of Wallachia
- Basarab II of Wallachia
- Basarab III of Wallachia
- Basarab IV of Wallachia
- Vladislav III of Wallachia
- Moise of Wallachia
