= Târgșor =

Coordinates: 44°53′20.85″N 25°55′35.97″E

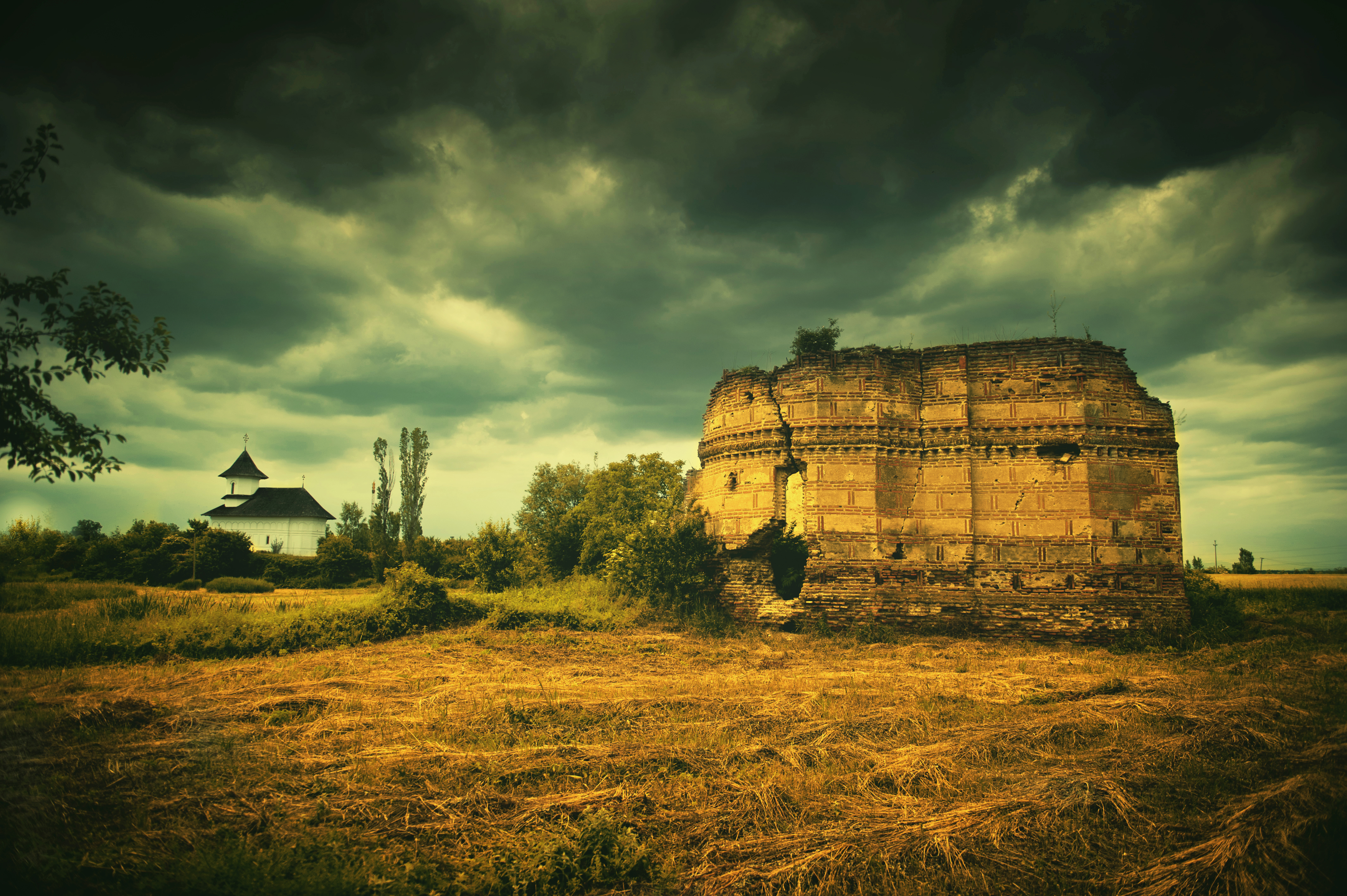
Ruins of the White Church in Târgșor

Târgșor is a former medieval market town in what is now Prahova County, Romania. The town peaked around 1600, after which it declined to become the village of Târgșoru Vechi, located about 7 km (4.3 mi) southwest of Ploiești.

== History ==
Built in a heavily forested area, Târgșor developed thanks to the local fair and its auspicious location at a crossroad of several trade routes. These roads included Drumul Brăilei, which linked Târgoviște to the Danube port of Brăila, as well as the roads which linked Târgșor to Brașov and Bucharest.

Târgșor gets its name from the diminutive of târg (market, fair) and can be related to the name of Târgoviște, which was the capital of Wallachia and a much bigger city. The settlement transformed into a town sometimes between 1368 and 1412, during the rule of Mircea I. The first document mentioning his name was a September 1412 document by Voivode of Transylvania Stibor of Stiboricz, who granted the people of Brașov the "privileges of yore and worthy liberties".

Soon after, the merchants of Târgșor were granted trade privileges by Wallachia. The town was ruled by a județ and 12 pârgari. Unlike other Wallachian cities at the time, in Târgșor there were no traces of German colonists, nor a Catholic church.

The prince of Wallachia had a residence in Târgșor, which was probably built in the 16th century. While only Neagoe Basarab (ruled 1512–1521) refers to Târgșor as a seat, there are hints that the residence was earlier, as the church in the town, built by Vladislav II in 1447 was called the Princely Church (Biserica Domnească). (Vlad the Impaler had also built a church inside the royal court.) The residence decayed by 1600 and nowadays, only its ruined church survives. Recent archaeological research showed that the ruins thought to be the palace belonged to another church, Church of St. Nicholas, built by Vlad the Monk, while the palace's location has yet to be established.

The city reached its peak around 1500, when it was one of only three cities in Wallachia (the other two being Câmpulung and Târgoviște) where the Brașov merchants were allowed to sell their wares. In 1503, the trade of the merchants of Târgșor with Brașov was worth almost 1 million asprons, second only to Câmpulung.

Some historians argue that Ștefan IV of Moldavia's 1526 attack led to the demise of the city, but there are records of Târgșor merchants in Brașov long after this moment. The voivode Mihnea Turcitul built a church in Târgșor in 1589, of which only the southern wall is now preserved. The decline of the town began in the 17th century, the main reason being that the emergence of a larger nearby city, Ploiești.

== Demographics ==
The custom records show that most of the merchants had Romanian names (such as Tudor, Stan, Costea, Oprea), but nevertheless, there were merchants having foreign names (such as Tabutsch, Francilla, and Simon). In the 16th century, a number of Greeks settled in the city.
