= Conțeasca =

- Location within Romania

Location
- Country: Romania
- Counties: Iași County
- Villages: Tătăruși, Conțești

Physical characteristics
- Mouth: Siret
  - coordinates: 47.3025°N 26.7203°E
- Length: 17 km (11 mi)
- Basin size: 73 km^{2} (28 sq mi)

Basin features
- Progression: Siret→ Danube→ Black Sea
- Tributaries
  - left: Călugărul

The Conțeasca is a right tributary of the river Siret in Romania. It discharges into the Siret near Hârtoape. Its length is 17 km (11 mi) and its basin size 73 km^{2} (28 sq mi).
