= Călugăru =

Călugăru may refer to several entities in Romania:

== People ==
- Alice Călugăru
- Ion Călugăru

== Places ==
- Călugăru, a village in Botoroaga Commune, Teleorman County
- Călugăru River
- Călugăru Mic River

== See also ==
- Călugărul (disambiguation)
- Călugăr
- Călugări
