= Basarab the Old =

Voivode of Wallachia in the 1470s

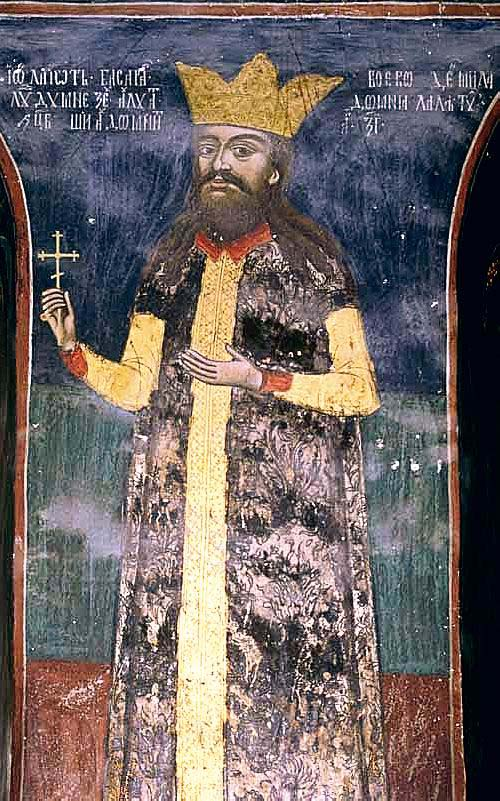
- Painting at Horezu Monastery, 17th century

Prince of Wallachia
- 1st reign: November – December 1473
- Predecessor: Radu the Handsome
- Successor: Radu the Handsome
- 2nd reign: Spring 1474
- Predecessor: Radu the Handsome
- Successor: Radu the Handsome
- 3rd reign: September – October 1474
- Predecessor: Radu the Handsome
- Successor: Radu the Handsome
- 4th reign: January 1475 – November 1476
- Predecessor: Radu the Handsome
- Successor: Vlad the Impaler
- 5th reign: December 1476 – November 1477
- Predecessor: Vlad the Impaler
- Successor: Basarab the Young
- Died: 22 December 1480
- House: House of Dănești
- Father: Dan II of Wallachia
- Religion: Eastern Orthodox

Basarab III the Old (Romanian: Basarab cel Bătrân; died before 22 December 1480), also known as Basarab Laiotǎ, (Note: His opponents in Wallachia referred to him simply as Laiotă, while the name Basarab Laiotă is attested only in the Putna Chronicle, compiled in Moldavia during the first quarter of the 16th century. Some historians, beginning with Nicolae Iorga, have interpreted the byname as meaning "the Black", deriving it from the Romanian adjective laiu. The linguist Emil Petrovici argues that Laiotă is a version of Vlaiotă, itself a diminutive form of Vlad or Vladislav, resulting from the regular reduction of the initial consonant cluster vl- to l- in Romanian personal names of Slavic origin. The historians Levente Nagy and Enikő Szilágyi interpret Laiotă as a Romanian adaptation of the name Lajos (the Hungarian version of Louis).) was voivode (prince) of Wallachia, ruling on five separate occasions: initially from November to December 1473, twice briefly in 1474, subsequently from 1475 to 1476, and finally for a short period in 1477. A member of the Dănești branch of the Basarab dynasty, he was a grandson of Dan II of Wallachia. His brothers, Vladislav II and Dan III, contested the Wallachian throne with Vlad II Dracul and Vlad III Dracula, members of the rival Drăculești branch, in 1447 and 1460, respectively. Basarab himself is first recorded as a claimant in 1471, when he emerged as a rival to Dracula's brother, Radu the Handsome. At the time, he was living in Transylvania, the easternmost province of the Kingdom of Hungary, but came into conflict with the Transylvanian Saxon merchants over their alliance with Radu and fled to Moldavia. There, he sought the support of Stephen the Great, who had gone to war with Radu over control of the Danubian ports.

Basarab first came to power in Wallachia following a successful invasion by Stephen the Great in late November 1473, but was forced to flee to Moldavia within a month when Radu returned with Ottoman military assistance. After an unsuccessful incursion into Wallachia early the following year, Basarab exploited Radu's illness to launch another invasion, regaining the throne by August 1474. By early September, however, he had again fled to Moldavia. Stephen restored him to power in October, but he soon faced a rival claimant backed by Hungary, Basarab the Young, another member of the Dănești branch, who defeated him and seized the throne on 20 October. The circumstances of the elder Basarab's subsequent restoration remain uncertain. Some historians maintain that he regained power with Ottoman support before the Battle of Vaslui, in which his defection contributed to Stephen's victory over the Ottomans on 10 January 1475, while others argue that Stephen restored him only after the battle.

Reports of an impending large-scale Ottoman invasion of Moldavia prompted Basarab to seek closer ties with Hungary, but in May or June 1476 he submitted to the Ottoman sultan Mehmed II. He subsequently joined the Ottoman campaign and fought alongside the sultan's forces at the Battle of Valea Albă on 26 July. Although Stephen the Great was defeated, the invaders failed to conquer Moldavia and were compelled to withdraw by famine and plague. In November, Vlad Dracula made a bid for the Wallachian throne with Hungarian support, forcing Basarab to flee to Ottoman territory. Restored to power by Ottoman backing for the last time in late 1476 or early 1477, Basarab sought a reconciliation with Hungary but was driven from Wallachia by Stephen the Great, who now supported Basarab the Young. He fled to Transylvania, from where he launched raids into Wallachia before dying in unknown circumstances.

== Early life ==
Basarab's life is sparsely documented, with the few surviving primary sources providing only fragmentary and frequently contradictory accounts. Although he referred to himself in his charters as "the son of Dan the great voivode", an apparent reference to Dan II, who had ruled Wallachia twice between 1420 and 1431, he was in fact Dan II's grandson. His father was another Dan, a son of Dan II, who died on 1 July 1440. Basarab had two brothers, Vladislav and Dan. They belonged to the Dănești branch of Wallachia's ruling Basarab dynasty, named after their great-grandfather, Dan I. The Dănești contested the Wallachian throne with the rival Drăculești branch, with both factions frequently seeking support from neighbouring powers. The Dănești generally enjoyed the support of the kings of Hungary, whereas the Drăculești were more frequently backed by the Ottoman Empire. The Wallachian voivodes were customarily granted two fiefs in Transylvania, Amlaș and Făgăraș, by the Hungarian monarchs in order to secure their allegiance.

Basarab's brother, Vladislav II, was placed on the Wallachian throne by John Hunyadi, the governor of Hungary, following Hunyadi's capture and execution of Vlad II Dracul and his eldest son, Mircea II, both members of the Drăculești branch of the dynasty, in 1447. Vladislav's reign ended in the summer of 1456, when Vlad III Dracula, a younger son of Vlad II, invaded Wallachia and seized the throne. Vladislav was killed during the conflict, although the precise circumstances of his death remain uncertain. Dracula subsequently faced rival claimants, among them Dan, another brother of Vladislav II and Basarab, who enjoyed the support of the magistrates of Brașov, a prominent Transylvanian Saxon town. Dan invaded Wallachia in April 1460 in an attempt to secure the throne, but was defeated and beheaded on Dracula's orders. Dracula was himself deposed in the summer of 1462 by his younger brother, Radu the Handsome, who gained control of Wallachia with Ottoman support. Dracula fled to Hungary, where he was arrested on accusations of having encouraged an Ottoman invasion of the kingdom.

== Claimant to Wallachia ==
Basarab's earliest surviving document, addressed to the magistrates of Brașov from a Transylvanian estate near Sighișoara, is dated 21 January, most probably 1471, according to the historian Liviu Cîmpeanu. In it, Basarab styled himself waywoda Transalpinensis ('Voivode of Wallachia') and offered to protect the townspeople with the support of his retainers. By 31 May 1472, Basarab had come into conflict with the townspeople of Brașov, who had allied themselves with Radu the Handsome, and had seized sheep belonging to them. By that date, he had also moved to Moldavia, where he joined Stephen the Great, Voivode of Moldavia, who had been engaged in armed conflict with Radu over control of the Danubian ports, including Kiliia and Bilhorod-Dnistrovskyi. An undated letter from Radu to the magistrates of Sibiu records that Basarab had also dispatched an envoy named Stoica to Transylvania, suggesting an expansion of his diplomatic activities.

== Reigns ==
=== First reign ===
Basarab ascended the Wallachian throne with the support of Stephen the Great, who invaded Wallachia and captured Bucharest before installing Basarab as voivode on 24 November 1473. Four days later, Stephen defeated a counter-invasion by a combined force of 13,000 Ottoman and Wallachian troops, but withdrew to Moldavia early the following month. Basarab's first reign was short-lived, as Radu returned within a month at the head of an army comprising 17,000 Ottoman and 20,000 Wallachian soldiers. Radu defeated Basarab on 23 December, forcing him to flee the battlefield. Pursued by Ottoman aḳıncıs (irregular cavalry raiders) as far as Bârlad, Basarab eventually reached Moldavia after 31 December 1473.

=== Second reign ===
In March 1474, Basarab accompanied Stephen the Great on another invasion of Wallachia, which was unsuccessful because of adverse weather conditions. The precise date of Basarab's first restoration to the Wallachian throne remains unknown. According to a letter from Radu the Handsome, Stephen ordered Basarab to invade Wallachia upon learning of Radu's sudden illness. By 10 August, Radu had been forced to seek refuge in the fortress of Giurgiu, accompanied by the boyars and courtiers who remained loyal to him. On 4 September, Basarab issued a royal charter in favour the Bolintin Monastery near Bucharest, but was again forced to flee to Moldavia less than a month later.

=== Third reign ===
Basarab was restored to the Wallachian throne with the assistance of Stephen the Great, who led an army into Wallachia, captured a fortress on the river Teleajen and reinstated Basarab as voivode by 4 or 5 October 1474. His rule was subsequently challenged by his cousin, Basarab the Young, who invaded Wallachia from Hungarian territory, allegedly with the support of Stephen Báthory, Voivode (royal governor) of Transylvania, according to the historian Constantin Rezachevici. The invasion was repelled by the combined forces of Stephen the Great and Basarab the Old. Following Stephen the Great's withdrawal from Wallachia, however, Basarab the Young launched another invasion and defeated his elder cousin on 20 October 1474.

=== Fourth reign ===
Stephen the Great, Prince of Moldavia

Basarab the Old disappears from the historical record until January 1475. According to the historian Liviu Cîmpeanu, following his defeat, he fled to Ottoman territory. He joined Hadım Suleiman Pasha, the governor of Rumelia, whom Sultan Mehmed II had appointed to lead a punitive expedition against Moldavia. After restoring Basarab to the Wallachian throne, Suleiman took him on the campaign as commander of the advance guard. Basarab secretly informed Stephen the Great of the Ottoman army's movements and offered to defect should Stephen attack. During the Battle of Vaslui on 10 January 1475, Basarab turned against the Ottomans, contributing to Stephen's decisive victory.

Jakob Unrest's Austrian Chronicle, a compilation drawing on various sources, including printed news-sheets and rumours, is the sole source for Cîmpeanu's reconstruction of events. He argues that Unrest's account is corroborated by a letter sent from the Transylvanian town of Turda to Matthias Corvinus, King of Hungary, two weeks after the battle. According to the letter, Basarab was staying in an unidentified fortress during the battle but subsequently attacked the retreating Ottoman forces, killing many of their soldiers. Other historians, including Rezachevici and Jonathan Eagles, maintain that Suleiman restored Radu the Handsome to the Wallachian throne in late 1474 and that Radu subsequently supported the Ottomans at the Battle of Vaslui. Rezachevici also states that Basarab fought alongside the Moldavians at the Battle of Vaslui.

The Austrian Chronicle records that "fourteen days after the Three Kings' Day" (20 January), Basarab defeated and killed a "Turkish voivode" and his 6,000 retainers. Cîmpeanu identifies this voivode as Radu the Handsome, arguing that the two military banners he possessed, each bearing a red cross, indicate that he was a Christian. According to the chronicle, Basarab subsequently sent the voivode's banners, weapons and warhorse to Matthias Corvinus. Rezachevici considers the identification of the "Turkish voivode" with Radu unlikely. Stephen and Basarab continued their campaign against the Ottomans, defeating an army commanded by three "voivodes", whom Cîmpeanu identifies as the governors of the Ottoman provinces along the Lower Danube. On 1 February 1475, Basarab sent envoys to the Saxons of Brașov to initiate negotiations. The Saxons remained distrustful of him, as evidenced by their use of spies in Wallachia. Nevertheless, on 11 July, he confirmed the traditional privileges of Brașov's merchants, including their right to travel freely within Wallachia. The witness list of his first charter of grant, issued on 1 June 1475, proves that many boyars who had held high office under Radu had recognised Basarab's rule.

As reports of an impending Ottoman invasion spread, Basarab sought Hungarian protection and, by 6 June, had sworn fealty to Corvinus, as had Stephen the Great. Ultimately, however, the Ottomans did not invade Wallachia, instead conquering Kiliia and Bilhorod-Dnistrovskyi from Moldavia, the Black Sea port of Caffa from Genoa, and the Principality of Theodoro on the Crimean Peninsula. The date and circumstances of Basarab's submission to the Ottomans remain uncertain. Basarab referred to it in a letter addressed to the magistrates of Brașov, dated 26 June, but with no year specified. In the letter, he stated that he had personally visited Mehmed II and had also secured the interests of the merchants of Brașov. The historian Andrei Mirea argues that the letter dates from 1475 and that Basarab's submission was preceded by an assembly of the boyars earlier that month, at which they gave their consent to his decision.

Stephen the Great distrusted Basarab and persuaded Corvinus to release Vlad Dracula and recognise him as the legitimate voivode of Wallachia on 14 July 1475. Corvinus also authorised Vlad to raise troops, but he was ultimately unable to launch an invasion of Wallachia and lost Corvinus's support. On 16 January 1476, John Pongrácz, Voivode of Transylvania, urged the magistrates of Brașov to expel Vlad's supporters from the town. Meanwhile, Basarab approached Saxon merchants in Brașov and Sibiu to purchase shields and bows in preparation for mobilising his army. In May 1476, Mehmed II personally assumed command of a new invasion of Moldavia. Confronted by both the Ottoman threat and Vlad's attempt to reclaim the Wallachian throne, Basarab travelled across the Danube to the sultan's camp, where, by 26 June, he had formally acknowledged the sultan's authority and agreed to pay tribute. He also agreed to accompany the sultan on his campaign against Moldavia. Mehmed accepted Basarab's submission and bestowed upon him an exceptionally fine tent and a horse, in addition to the customary insignia of princely authority, including a cap, caftan, mace and standards. The letter in which Basarab informed the townspeople of Brașov of his submission contains the earliest known reference to a new princely official, the portar. According to Cîmpeanu, the office was established on the Moldavian model, with its holder responsible for guarding and maintaining the princely residence.

Basarab soon returned to Wallachia to prepare for the campaign against Moldavia. News of his submission to the sultan prompted the magistrates of Brașov to confiscate goods belonging to Wallachian merchants from Gherghița. After the Ottoman army reached the Danube, Basarab joined its ranks sometime after 4 July and fought alongside the Ottomans against Stephen the Great at the Battle of Valea Albă on 26 July. Although the Ottomans defeated Stephen's army, they failed to capture the Moldavian fortresses, while shortages of food and an outbreak of plague eventually forced them to withdraw from Moldavia. On 15 August, their rearguard was defeated by a Transylvanian army commanded by Stephen Báthory and Vlad Dracula. Báthory and Vlad invaded Wallachia and captured Târgoviște and Bucharest by mid-November. Basarab fled into Ottoman territory, and Vlad regained the Wallachian throne.

=== Fifth reign ===
Basarab returned to Wallachia around Christmas 1476 with the support of the Ottoman governors along the Danube. Vlad Dracula was killed in battle in late December 1476 or early January 1477, either by enemy forces or by his own men. Basarab regained the throne and soon reached an agreement with the magistrates of Sibiu. Through their mediation and that of the magistrates of Brașov, he sought reconciliation with the Hungarian court, but Matthias Corvinus rejected his overtures. In August, he requested that the Saxons of Brașov refrain from supporting the claim of Dracula's illegitimate brother, Vlad the Monk, who had settled in Făgăraș, to the Wallachian throne. In November 1477, Stephen the Great and Basarab the Young invaded Wallachia. The elder Basarab was defeated and forced into what proved to be permanent exile.

== Last years ==
After being deposed for the fifth time, Basarab and his followers fled to Hungarian territory. He initially settled in Făgăraș before moving to Sibiu, where he was entrusted with the defence of Transylvania's southern frontiers, while his mercenary troops carried out several raids into Wallachia. Meanwhile, Basarab the Young participated in an Ottoman invasion of Transylvania, but the invading army was defeated at the Battle of Breadfield by Stephen Báthory on 13 October 1479. Taking advantage of his rival's weakened position, Basarab invaded Wallachia and captured Basarab the Young's wife, Lady Mara, together with his treasury. In retaliation, the younger Basarab had imprisoned Basarab's daughter, who had remained in Wallachia, by 24 February 1480.

The circumstances of Basarab's death are unknown. In a letter dated 22 December 1480, Báthory referred to him as the "late Basarab the Old". Báthory subsequently instructed the magistrates of Brașov to recruit first 110 and then 300 horsemen who had previously served in Basarab's army. His place of burial is unknown.

== Bibliography ==
- Andreescu, Ștefan (1997). Istoria românilor: cronicari, misionari, ctitori (sec. XV–XVII) [The History of the Romanians: Chroniclers, Missionaries, and Founders (15th–17th Centuries)] (in Romanian). Editura Universității din București. ISBN 978-973-575-182-1.
- Cazacu, Matei (2017). Dracula. BRILL. ISBN 978-90-04-34725-0.
- Cîmpeanu, Liviu (2014). "Basarab Laiotă, domn al Ţării Româneşti: preliminarii la o monografie" [Basarab Laiotǎ, Ruler of Wallachia: Preliminaries to a Monograph] (PDF). Studii și Materiale de Istorie Medie (in Romanian). XXXII. Academia Românǎ, Institutul de Istorie "Nicolae Iorga": 145–172. ISSN 1222-4766.
- Eagles, Jonathan (2014). Stephen the Great and Balkan Nationalism: Moldova and Eastern European History. I.B. Tauris. ISBN 978-1-78076-353-8.
- Florescu, Radu R.; McNally, Raymond T. (1989). Dracula, Prince of Many Faces: His Life and his Times. Back Bay Books. ISBN 978-0-316-28656-5.
- Hasan, Mihai Florin (2013). "Aspecte ale relaţiilor matrimoniale munteano-maghiare din secolele XIV-XV [Aspects of the Hungarian-Wallachian matrimonial relations of the fourteenth and fifteenth centuries]". Revista Bistriţei (in Romanian). XXVII. Cumplexul Muzeal Bistrița-Năsăud: 128–159. ISSN 1222-5096.
- Mirea, Andrei (2024). "The Slavonic Epistles of Basarab the Elder to the Transylvanian Saxons (1474–1476)" (PDF). Revue des Études Sud-Est Européennes. LXII. Institute for South-East European Studies of the Romanian Academy: 167–204. ISSN 0035-2063.
- Mitea, Daniela Monica (2008). "Basarab cel Bătrân (Laiotă)'s Relations with Transylvania during His Wallachian Reigns and His Transylvanian Pretendance". Apulum. 45. Muzeul National al Unirii Alba Iulia: 133–152. ISSN 1013-428X.
- Nagy, Levente; Szilágyi, Emőke Rita (2022). "Câteva date noi despre genealogia familiilor Olahus, Hunyadi și Dracula (Vlad Țepeș)" [Some New Data on the Genealogy of the Olahus, Hunyadi and Dracula (Vlad Țepeș) Families] (PDF). Studii și Materiale de Istorie Medie (in Romanian). LX. Academia Română, Institutul de Istorie Nicolae Iorga: 125–164. ISSN 1222-4766.
- Petrovici, Emil (1958). "Numele de persoană Laiotă în toponimia romînească" [The Personal Name Laiotă in Romanian Toponymy]. Romanoslavica (in Romanian). III. Asociația Slaviștilor din Republica Popularǎ Romînǎ: 13–20. ISSN 2537-4214.
- Pop, Ioan-Aurel (2005). "Romanians in the 14th–16th Centuries: From the "Christian Republic" to the "Restoration of Dacia"". In Pop, Ioan-Aurel; Bolovan, Ioan (eds.). History of Romania: Compendium. Romanian Cultural Institute (Center for Transylvanian Studies). pp. 209–314. ISBN 978-973-7784-12-4.
- Rezachevici, Constantin (2001). Cronologia critică a domnilor din Țara Românească și Moldova: a. 1324-1881 [A Critical Chronology of the Rulers of Wallachia and Moldavia, 1324–1881] (in Romanian). Vol. I. Editura Enciclopedică. ISBN 978-973-45-0387-2.

Basarab the Old House of Dăneşti Died: 1480
Regnal titles
Preceded by Radu the Handsome	Voivode of Wallachia; 1473	Succeeded by Radu the Handsome
Preceded by Radu the Handsome	Voivode of Wallachia; 1474	Succeeded by Radu the Handsome
Preceded by Radu the Handsome	Voivode of Wallachia; 1474	Succeeded by Radu the Handsome
Preceded by Radu the Handsome	Voivode of Wallachia; 1475–1476	Succeeded by Vlad the Impaler
Preceded by Vlad the Impaler	Voivode of Wallachia; 1476–1477	Succeeded by Basarab the Young
