= Călugărul River =

Călugărul River may refer to:

- Călugărul, a tributary of the Conțeasca in Iași County
- Călugărul, a tributary of the Horăița in Neamț County

== See also ==
- Călugăreasa River (disambiguation)
- Izvorul Călugărului River (disambiguation)
- Călugăreni (disambiguation)
