= Călugăreanu =

Călugăreanu is a Romanian surname that may refer to:

- Cornel Călugăreanu (1930–2011), Romanian basketball player
- Dimitrie Călugăreanu (1868–1937), Romanian physician, naturalist and physiologist
- Gheorghe Călugăreanu (1902–1976), Romanian mathematician, son of Dimitrie Călugăreanu
- Vitalie Călugăreanu (born 1977), Moldovan journalist
