= Dan I =

Dan I may refer to:

- Dan I of Wallachia, reigned c. 1383 – 1386
- Dan I of Denmark, progenitor of the Danish royal house
- Dan-I - Disco one hit wonder from 1979
