= Tătăruși =

- Commune
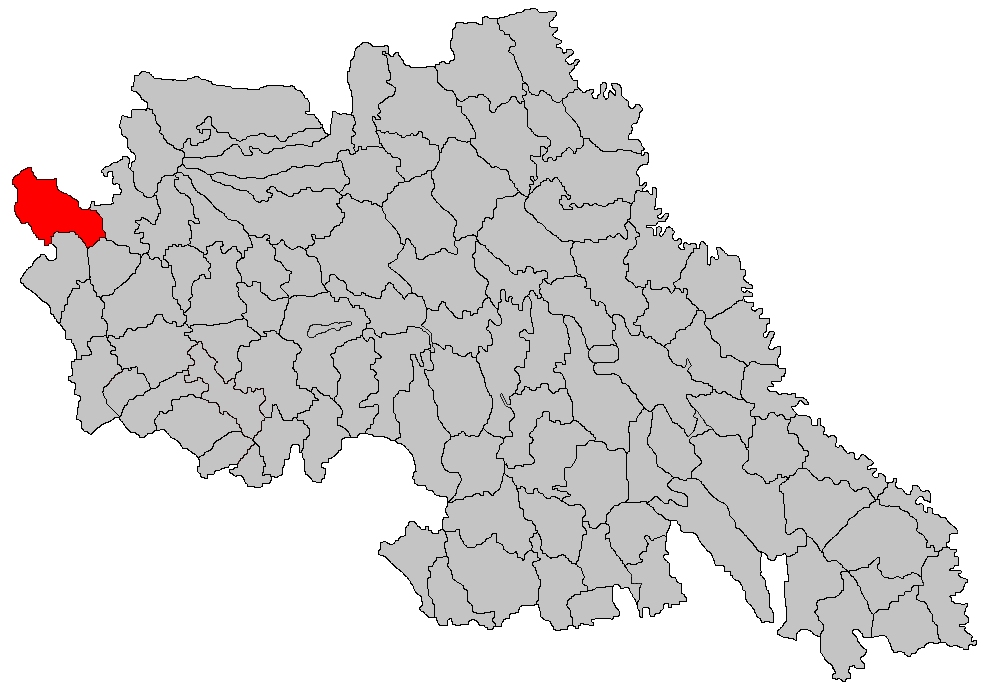
- Location in Iași County

- Location in Romania
- Coordinates: 47°21′N 26°35′E
- Country: Romania
- County: Iași
- Area: 65.42 km^{2} (25.26 sq mi)
- Population (2021-12-01): 4,619
  - Density: 71/km^{2} (180/sq mi)
- Time zone: EET/EEST (UTC+2/+3)
- Postal code: 707500
- Vehicle reg.: IS
- Website: www.tatarusi.ro//

Tătăruși is a commune in Iași County, Western Moldavia, Romania. It is composed of five villages: Iorcani, Pietrosu, Tătăruși, Uda and Vâlcica.
