= Călugăreasa River =

Călugăreasa River may refer to:

- Călugăreasa, a tributary of the Băiaș in Vâlcea County
- Călugăreasa, a tributary of the Câlnic in Gorj County

== See also ==
- Călugărul River (disambiguation)
- Izvorul Călugărului River (disambiguation)
- Călugăreni (disambiguation)
