= Basarab the Young =

Prince of Wallachia (before 1444–1482)

Basarab Țepeluș

Prince of Wallachia (1st reign)
- Reign: November 1477 – September 1481
- Predecessor: Basarab Laiotă cel Bătrân
- Successor: Vlad Călugărul

Prince of Wallachia (2nd reign)
- Reign: November 1481 – 23 March 1482
- Predecessor: Vlad Călugărul
- Successor: Vlad Călugărul
- Born: before 1444
- Died: 23 March 1482; Glogova, Gorj
- Issue: Neagoe Basarab (claimed)
- House: Dănești
- Father: Basarab II of Wallachia
- Religion: Orthodox

Basarab IV cel Tânăr ("the Young"), also known as Țepeluș ("the little Impaler"), (before 1444 ? – 23 March 1482) son of Basarab II, and grandson of Dan II (1422-1431) was 4 times the voivode of the principality of Wallachia between 1474 and 1482: from Oct to Dec 1474, from Jan 1478 to June 1480, from Nov 1480 to before July 1481, and again from Aug 1481 to July 1482.

This was during an unstable political climate in medieval Wallachia that had another 4 princes ruling for some periods of time in those years.

== Reigns ==
Basarab IV Țepeluș acceded first to the Wallachian throne in 1474, when with help from Transylvanian voivode Stefan Bathory he overthrew his first cousin Basarab III known as the 'Old'. He was then removed from power within 2 months by Radu III (also called Radu the Handsome), his 2nd cousin, who was brought in by a large Ottoman army who was marching to punish Stephen III of Moldavia.

Following his first rule Basarab IV Țepeluș sought refuge back in the Hungarian territories, where he most likely spent most of his life up to that point. In summer 1476 he is dispatched to Transylvania with Vlad III Țepeș (Țepeș = the Impaler) who was preferred by king Matthias Corvinus and Stephen III for the throne of Wallachia & subsequently moves to Moldavia where he was mentioned at the court of Stephen III. It is with the latter's help that before Jan 1478 Basarab Țepeluș again ousted his cousin Basarab Laiotă and starts his 2nd and longest reign.

In 1479 Basarab IV was forced by Ali Koca Bey to side with Ottomans and take part in the Ottoman campaign against Transylvania, providing some 5,000 Wallachian troops to the campaign, where he faced his arch-rival cousin Basarab who had also been living in Transylvania since his overthrow in 1477. Basarab IV brought approx.: 2,000 infantry to the campaign, and with help from Hungarians defeated the combined forces of Wallachia and the Ottomans at the Battle of Breadfield.

In 1481, the same year Mehmed II died and conflict between his two surviving sons, Bayezid II and Cem erupted into open conflict, Vlad IV, the pious half-brother of Vlad III and Radu III, who until now had shown little interest the throne for himself before now was placed on the throne by Ştefan III., who had invaded Wallachia that June and routed Basarab IV at Râmnicu Vâlcea.

The 15th century was a very volatile time in Wallachia, with the throne passing first from one then to another of the many Princes and family members of both Branches of the House of Basarab that desired it, and soon enough (i.e. July 1481) Basarab IV was again Voivode of Wallachia, with Ottoman support. Ştefan made a last attempt to secure his influence in Wallachia the next summer. and within the year Basarab lost the throne again. Although Vlad IV was restored, he was soon forced to accept the Sultan's suzerainty.

== Death ==
Basarab IV was killed during the clashes around Mar-Jul of 1482, perhaps due to a conspiracy led by the boyars of Wallachia. Others however suggest he died in battle by Ștefan III during Ștefan III's invasion that year.

Later on, Neagoe Craiovescu, who had acceded to the throne of Wallachia under the name Neagoe Basarab, claimed that Basarab IV was his father by having had an affair with his mother Neaga, who was then married to grand boyar Pârvu Craiovescu. While the Craiovești clan was close with the Dănești branch of the Wallachian ruling family, the claim is highly questionable but was used later on to support its princely origins.

== Bibliography ==
- Cristea, Ovidiu (2016). "Guerre, Histoire et Mémoire en Moldavie au temps d'Étienne le Grand (1457–1504)". In Păun, Radu G. (ed.). Histoire, mémoire et dévotion. Regards croisés sur la construction des identités dans le monde orthodoxe aux époques byzantine et post-byzantine. La Pomme d'or. pp. 305–344. ISBN 978-2-9557042-0-2.
- Demciuc, Vasile M. (2004). "Domnia lui Ștefan cel Mare. Repere cronologice". Codrul Cosminului (10): 3–12. ISSN 1224-032X.
- Eagles, Jonathan (2014). Stephen the Great and Balkan Nationalism: Moldova and Eastern European History. I.B. Tauris. ISBN 978-1-78076-353-8.
- Florescu, Radu R.; McNally, Raymond T. (1989). Dracula, Prince of Many Faces: His Life and his Times. Back Bay Books. ISBN 978-0-316-28656-5.
- Kármán, Gábor; Kunčevic, Lovro, eds. (2013). The European Tributary States of the Ottoman Empire in the Sixteenth and Seventeenth Centuries. Leiden: Brill. ISBN 9789004246065.
- Shaw, Stanford J. (1976). History of the Ottoman Empire and Modern Turkey: Volume 1, Empire of the Gazis: The Rise and Decline of the Ottoman Empire 1280–1808. Cambridge University Press. ISBN 978-0-52121-280-9.

Basarab the Young House of Dănești Died: 1482
Regnal titles
| Preceded by Basarab Laiotă cel Bătrân | Voivode of Wallachia; 1477–1481 | Succeeded by Vlad Călugărul |
| Preceded by Vlad Călugărul | Voivode of Wallachia; 1481–1482 | Succeeded by Vlad Călugărul |
