= Vladislav II of Wallachia =

Vladislav II
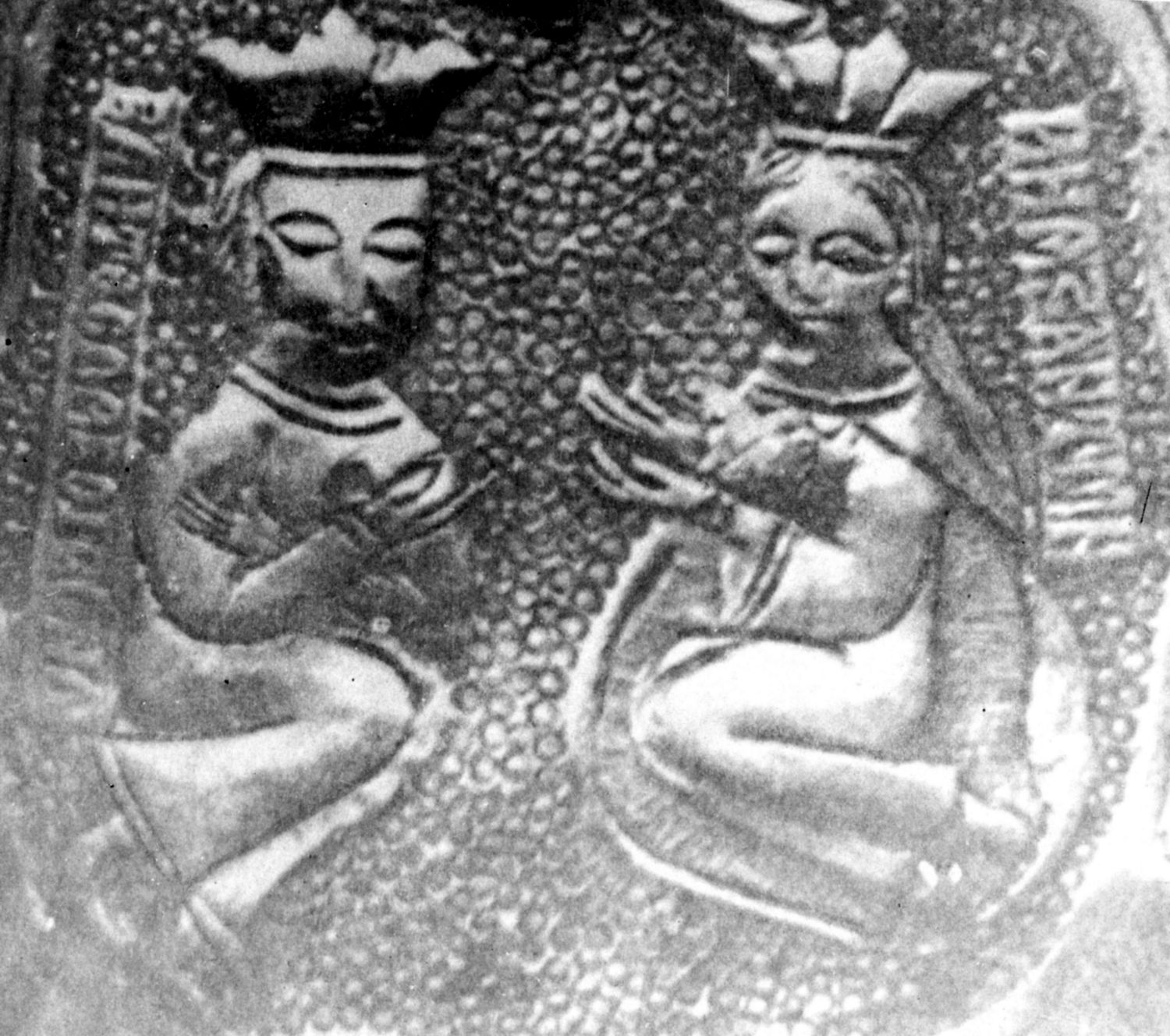
- Portrait of Vladislav II and his wife Neacșa at St. Stephen’s Monastery

Voivode of Wallachia
- Reign: December 1447 – October 1448
- Predecessor: Vlad II Dracul
- Successor: Vlad the Impaler

Voivode of Wallachia
- Reign: December 1448 – 20 August 1456
- Predecessor: Vlad the Impaler
- Successor: Vlad the Impaler
- Born: Unknown
- Died: 20 August 1456
- Burial: Dealu Monastery, Dâmbovița County
- Spouse: Doamna Neacșa
- House: House of Dănești
- Father: Dan II of Wallachia
- Religion: Orthodox Christian

Vladislav II (died 20 August 1456) was a voivode of the principality of Wallachia, from 1447 to 1448, and again from 1448 to 1456. The way Vladislav II came to the throne is debatable. The most accepted view is that Vladislav assassinated Vlad II Dracul, ruler of Wallachia, and was subsequently placed on the throne by John Hunyadi, on the other, Vladislav II was helped by the Ottomans to replace Dan III which was assigned by the Hungarians.

After several years of political dispute with his rival Vlad the Impaler over their respective claims to the throne, the two princes agreed to settle the dispute in single combat. At the end of their duel, Vlad killed Vladislav in front of their hosts.

== Conflict with John Hunyadi ==
It is not known if Vladislav II had been invited to take part in the Battle of Kosovo (1448) or not. It is certain, however, that he did not send any troops in aid and as a result, John Hunyadi took back the Transylvanian possessions of Făgăraș and Amlaș on 23 April 1452. Vladislav retaliated by embargoing all Wallachian trade to Brașov County, then part of Hunyadi's Transylvania. However, on 15 November 1455, after Hunyadi informed the people of Brașov that the embargo would be lifted, Vladislav seized back Transylvanian possessions, and attacked the Făgăraș fortress and in the process burns a few Saxon villages. In response, Hunyadi gives Vlad III; a son of the rival Drăculești house of Basarab (the future Vlad the Impaler) military support and, with the help of the Saxons whose villages were burned down, disposed Vladislav II.

== Death ==
On July 22, 1456, Vlad II Dracul's son Vlad III Dracula led a small army of mercenaries into Wallachia, when they were intercepted by Vladislav and his men near Târgșor. The commanders agreed to settle the dispute in single combat, so Vladislav and Dracula engaged in hand-to-hand combat in front of their hosts until Vlad Dracula struck a killing blow to Wallachia's Voivode.

Vladislav was not buried at the Snagov Monastery, which he founded; instead, he was buried at the Dealu Monastery. His gravestone is marked "August 22, 1456", however, that was the date of the engraving and not the date of his death. By August 22, Vlad III had already replaced Vladislav on the throne of Wallachia.

== Legacy ==
Vladislav founded the Snagov Monastery in 1453, where a wooden sculpted door has been preserved to this day, and is exhibited at the Religious Art Museum of Bucharest. At Mount Athos in 1450, Vladislav gave Koutloumousiou Monastery a charter and gave a gift of 10,000 Akçet to St. Elijah Skit.

== Notes ==
Vladislav II of Wallachia House of Dănești Died: 20 August 1456
Regnal titles
Preceded by Vlad the Dragon	Voivode of Wallachia; 1447-1448	Succeeded by Vlad the Impaler
Preceded by Vlad the Impaler	Voivode of Wallachia; 1448-1456	Succeeded by Vlad the Impaler
