= Vlad Călugărul =

- Voivode of Wallachia
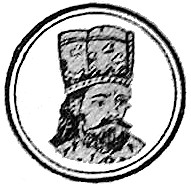

Voivode of Wallachia (1st reign)
- Reign: September – 16 November 1481
- Predecessor: Basarab Țepeluș cel Tânăr
- Successor: Basarab Țepeluș cel Tânăr

Voivode of Wallachia (2nd reign)
- Reign: April 1482 – September 1495
- Predecessor: Basarab Țepeluș cel Tânăr
- Successor: Radu IV the Great
- Born: prior to 1425
- Died: September 1495 (aged >70)
- Spouse: Doamna Rada Smaranda; Doamna Maria Palaiologina
- Issue: Vlad; Radu IV the Great; Mircea; Vlad V the Younger; Caplea of Wallachia
- House: House of Drăculești
- Father: Vlad II Dracul
- Mother: Doamna Călțuna
- Religion: Eastern Orthodox

Vlad IV Călugărul ("Vlad IV the Monk"; prior to 1425 – September 1495) was the Prince of Wallachia in 1481 and then from 1482 to 1495.

== Context of his reign ==
His father Vlad Dracul had previously held the throne, as had his brothers Mircea II and Radu the Handsome, and lastly Vlad III Dracula. The 15th century was a very volatile time in Wallachia, with the throne passing first from one then to another of the many princes that desired it. Both of his younger brothers, Vlad III and Radu, had been hostages for a number of years to the Ottoman Sultan, having been offered up to the Ottoman court by their own father, Vlad Dracul, in exchange for the Ottoman's support of Vlad Dracul regaining his throne. His father had first gained the throne following the death of Vlad the Monk's uncle.

Both his brothers Mircea II and Vlad III were able military commanders in the field, and both saw success in battle against the Ottomans. In 1447, his brother Mircea II and his father were both captured and brutally killed. Following this, Vlad III was placed on the throne by the Ottomans, but was forced off shortly thereafter by forces supported by John Hunyadi. This would begin a long quest by Vlad III to gain the throne, which he would do two more times. His longest time on the throne would be from 1456 to 1462, this being his reign of terror for which he would become best known, and which would lead to him being the inspiration for the novel Dracula, by Bram Stoker. His brother Radu gained the throne because he was the second in the line of succession, losing it several times to Basarab Laiotă cel Bătrân. Radu died in January 1475 at which time Basarab naturally took the throne yet again, only to be forced off shortly thereafter in 1476 by Vlad III. Vlad III was killed in battle during December 1476, after which Basarab Laiotă cel Bătrân was restored to the throne, only to be pushed off by Basarab Țepeluș cel Tânăr in November 1477.

Vlad the Monk was a contender to his brother's throne as ruler of the principality of Wallachia for many years, but he took no active part in fighting for the throne until near the end of Vlad III's lifetime.

== Reign ==
In 1481, the same year Mehmed II died, conflict between his two surviving sons, Bayezid II and Cem, erupted into open conflict. Vlad was now placed on the throne by Ștefan III of Moldavia, who had invaded Wallachia that June and routed Basarab IV at Râmnicu Vâlcea. Soon enough Basarab IV was again Voivode of Wallachia, with Ottoman support. Ștefan made a last attempt to secure his influence in Wallachia, and within the year Basarab lost the throne again, after which Vlad would reign until 1495. Although Vlad IV was restored, he was soon forced to accept the Sultan's suzerainty.

In 1495, he helped build St. Nicholas Church, in Brașov, Transylvania. There is nothing historically that suggests his death that same year was anything other than natural. His fairly long reign by comparison to those before him was due in part to his having the support of Ștefan III of Moldavia. He was succeeded by his son, Radu cel Mare, who would reign until 1508, when he was ousted by his first cousin Mihnea cel Rău, son of Vlad the Impaler.

== Bibliography ==
- Cristea, Ovidiu (2016). "Guerre, Histoire et Mémoire en Moldavie au temps d'Étienne le Grand (1457–1504)". In Păun, Radu G. (ed.). Histoire, mémoire et dévotion. Regards croisés sur la construction des identités dans le monde orthodoxe aux époques byzantine et post-byzantine. La Pomme d'or. pp. 305–344. ISBN 978-2-9557042-0-2.
- Demciuc, Vasile M. (2004). "Domnia lui Ștefan cel Mare. Repere cronologice". Codrul Cosminului (10): 3–12. ISSN 1224-032X.
- Eagles, Jonathan (2014). Stephen the Great and Balkan Nationalism: Moldova and Eastern European History. I.B. Tauris. ISBN 978-1-78076-353-8.
- Florescu, Radu R.; McNally, Raymond T. (1989). Dracula, Prince of Many Faces: His Life and his Times. Back Bay Books. ISBN 978-0-316-28656-5.
- Shaw, Stanford J. (1976). History of the Ottoman Empire and Modern Turkey: Volume 1, Empire of the Gazis: The Rise and Decline of the Ottoman Empire 1280–1808. Cambridge University Press. ISBN 978-0-52121-280-9.

Vlad Călugărul House of Drăculești Born: before 1425 Died: September 1495
Regnal titles
Preceded by Mircea II	Voivode of Wallachia; 1481	Succeeded by Basarab Ţepeluş cel Tânăr
Preceded by Basarab Ţepeluş cel Tânăr	Voivode of Wallachia; 1482–1495	Succeeded by Radu IV the Great
