= Radu the Handsome =

Ruler of Wallachia and Vlad the Impaler's brother

Voivode of Wallachia
- 1st reign: Before 15 August 1462 – 23 November 1473
- Predecessor: Vlad III
- Successor: Basarab III
- 2nd reign: 23 December 1473 – before 10 August 1474
- Predecessor: Basarab III
- Successor: Basarab III
- 3rd reign: After 4 September – 1-5 October 1474
- Predecessor: Basarab III
- Successor: Basarab III
- 4th reign: November/December 1474 – before 1 June 1475 (?)
- Predecessor: Basarab III
- Successor: Basarab III
- Born: c. 1438
- Died: January 1475 (aged 36–37)
- Spouse: Maria Despina
- Issue: Maria Voichița
- House: House of Drăculești
- Father: Vlad II Dracul
- Mother: Marina or Eupraxia of Moldavia
- Religion: Eastern Orthodoxy

Radu the Handsome (Romanian: Radu cel Frumos; c. 1438 – 1475) reigned as voivode (prince) of Wallachia on at least three separate occasions: first from 1462 to 1473, then from later in 1473 into 1474, before returning to power in the course of 1474. Radu was the youngest son of Vlad II Dracul, voivode of Wallachia. He entered Ottoman captivity alongside his brother, Vlad Dracula, either in 1442, when they were captured together with their father, or in 1444. From 1444 onwards, both brothers were held as hostages to secure the loyalty of their father, who had been restored to the Wallachian throne with Ottoman support. Caught between the competing interests of the Ottoman Empire and Hungary, their father sought to maintain a delicate balance between the two powers. In 1448, however, he was executed on the orders of John Hunyadi, governor of Hungary. Shortly thereafter, the Ottomans released Vlad Dracula to pursue his claim to the Wallachian throne, whilst Radu remained at the Ottoman court, where he became a favourite of the young Sultan Mehmed II and reportedly his lover.

Vlad Dracula's refusal to pay tribute to the Ottoman sultan and his raids into Ottoman territory prompted Mehmed II to launch a large-scale invasion of Wallachia in June 1462. Radu accompanied the sultan on the campaign as a claimant to the Wallachian throne. Although Mehmed eventually abandoned the punitive expedition, he left Radu at the Danubian port of Brăila to press his claim. Radu soon secured the support of most of the Wallachian boyars, forcing Vlad Dracula to flee to Hungary, where he was arrested and imprisoned on charges of treason by King Matthias Corvinus in November. Radu acknowledged the sultan's suzerainty and agreed to pay an annual tribute of 10,000 ducats in exchange for Ottoman protection and the preservation of Wallachia's internal autonomy. This arrangement served as a model for subsequent agreements between Wallachia and the Ottoman Empire over the following eight decades.

Radu subsequently came into conflict with Stephen the Great, voivode of Moldavia, over control of the ports of the Danube Delta. His attempt to capture Kiliia from the Moldavians proved unsuccessful, whilst Moldavian forces retaliated by destroying Brăila. Taking advantage of the Ottoman Empire's conflict with the Aq Qoyunlu in eastern Anatolia, Stephen invaded Wallachia in the autumn of 1473, forcing Radu to seek refuge in Ottoman territory and installing a rival claimant, Basarab Laiotă, on the Wallachian throne. With Ottoman support, Radu regained the throne in December of that year, but subsequently fell ill and was again driven from Wallachia by Basarab by August 1475. He recovered the throne for a second time by September, only to be forced into exile once more by another Moldavian invasion in October. Radu may have been restored to the throne for the final time during an Ottoman invasion of Moldavia in November or December 1474. If so, he subsequently fought alongside the Ottomans against Stephen at the Battle of Vaslui on 25 January 1475, which ended in a Moldavian victory. Radu died under uncertain circumstances in Transylvania.

== Early life ==
Radu was the youngest son of Vlad II Dracul, Voivode (Prince) of Wallachia. He was born between 23 August 1437, when his father mentioned only his elder brothers, Mircea and Vlad Dracula, and 2 August 1439, by which time Radu himself was also named in a royal charter issued by his father. According to the historian Matei Cazacu, Mircea and Vlad were the sons of Vlad Dracul's first wife, an unidentified Hungarian noblewoman, whereas Radu was born to his second wife, Marina, a sister of Ilie and Stephen, both Voivodes of Moldavia. The historian George D. Florescu, however, maintains that all three brothers were born to Vlad Dracul's sole wife, whom he identifies as Eupraxia of Moldavia.

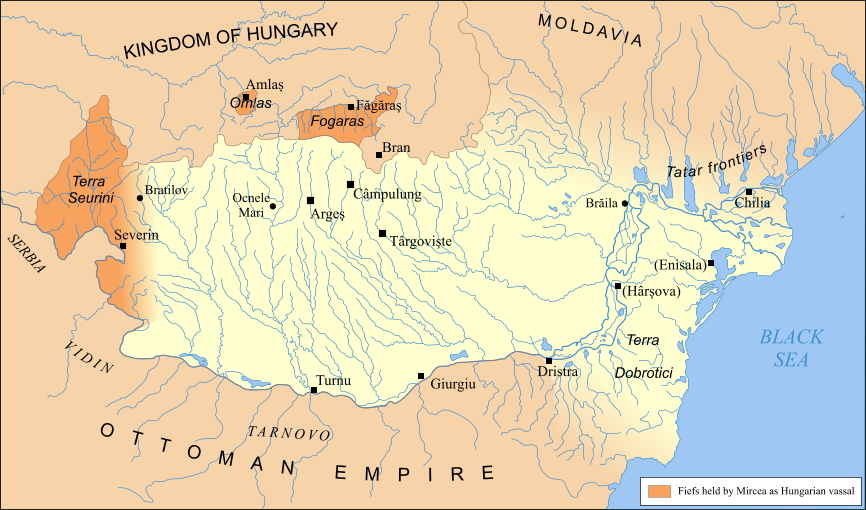
Wallachia during the reign of Radu's grandfather, Mircea the Old, and his fiefs in the Kingdom of Hungary (c. 1390)

Radu, his brothers and their father belonged to the Drăculești branch of the Basarab dynasty, which competed for the Wallachian throne with the rival Dănești branch. Claimants from both branches frequently sought the support of neighbouring powers in their dynastic struggles: the Drăculești generally relied on the Ottoman Empire, whilst the Dănești were more often supported by the kings of Hungary. The Hungarian monarchs had traditionally claimed suzerainty over Wallachia, although its rulers sometimes sought to counterbalance Hungarian influence through alliances with Poland and Lithuania. Their position was further complicated by Ottoman expansion into the Balkans, and from 1417 onwards the Wallachian voivodes also paid tribute to the Ottoman sultans. The kings of Hungary often granted the Wallachian voivodes two fiefs in Transylvania, Amlaș and Făgăraș, to secure their fealty.

Radu's father seized the Wallachian throne in 1436 following the death of his illegitimate brother, Alexander I Aldea. Although he had come to power with Hungarian support, a devastating Ottoman raid soon compelled him to continue paying tribute to Sultan Murad II. His subsequent refusal to support an Ottoman invasion of Transylvania, however, led to his arrest in Edirne on the sultan's orders. According to the historian Constantin Rezachevici, Radu and his brother Vlad Dracula were also imprisoned on this occasion. In 1443, Vlad Dracul's successor, Basarab II, joined the "Long Campaign" against the Ottomans led by John Hunyadi, Voivode (royal governor) of Transylvania. In response, Murad II released Vlad Dracul and restored him to the Wallachian throne in January 1444. According to Cazacu, the sultan subsequently demanded that Vlad Dracul surrender two of his sons as hostages in April 1444, prompting him to choose his two younger sons, Vlad Dracula and Radu, rather than his eldest, Mircea.

== Life in the Ottoman Empire ==
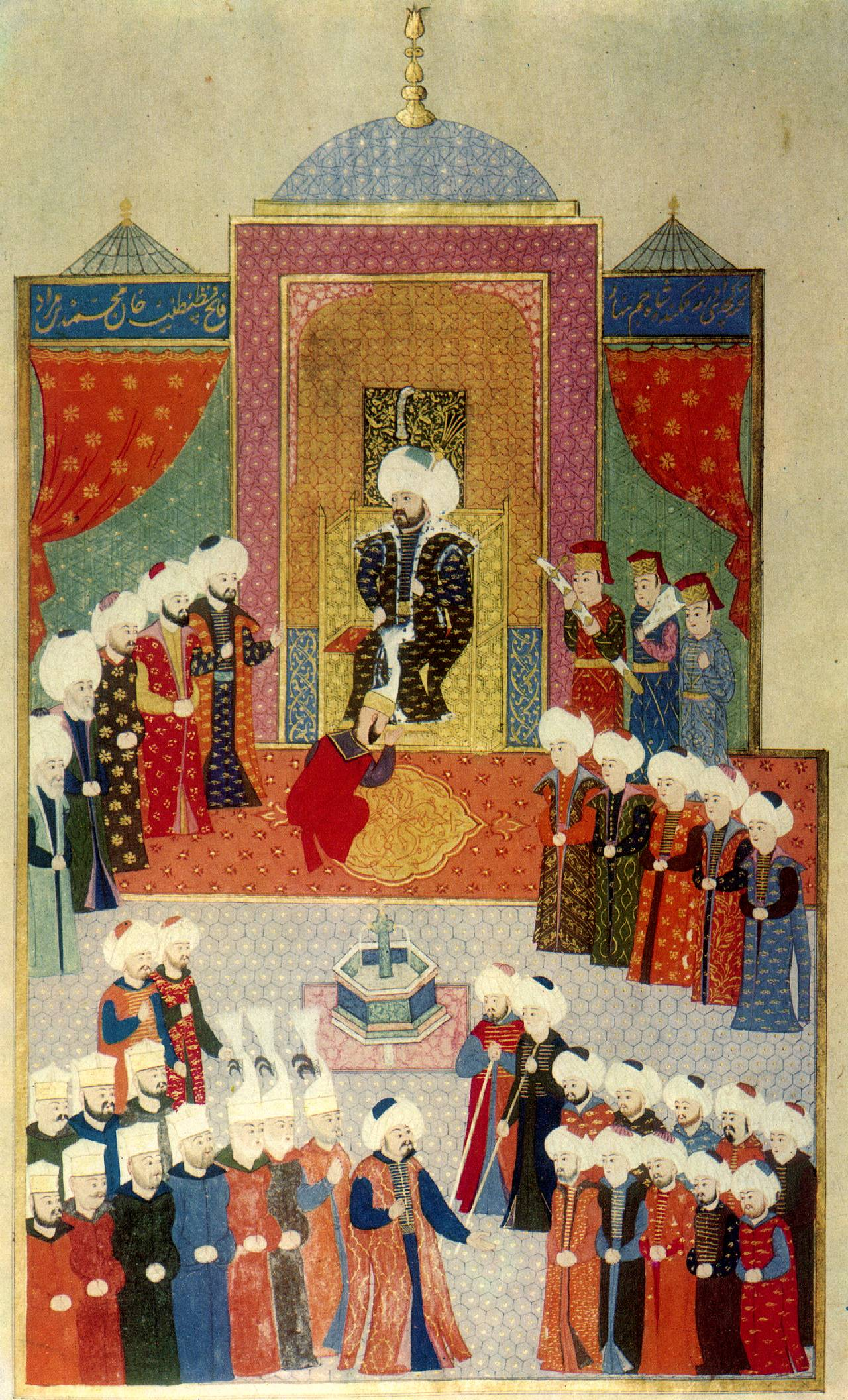
Accession of the Ottoman sultan Mehmed II in 1451

From either 1442 or 1444, Radu and Vlad Dracula were held captive in the fortress of Eğrigöz in eastern Anatolia. Nevertheless, their father sent 7,000 horsemen under the command of their eldest brother, Mircea, to join the campaign against the Ottomans led by Władysław, King of Hungary and Poland, in the autumn of 1444. During the Battle of Varna on 10 November, Sultan Murad II reportedly sent envoys to Mircea threatening to execute his captive brothers, prompting him to withdraw his troops from the battlefield. Despite this, Vlad Dracul believed that his two sons had been "massacred", as indicated by a letter he sent to the burghers of Brașov, a Transylvanian Saxon town, after the battle, which ended in an Ottoman victory and the death of Władysław. Both hostages, however, survived. According to Cazacu, they were transferred to Edirne after their father concluded a new peace treaty with Murad in late 1447. The treaty, together with a Wallachian ban on the import of debased Hungarian coins, provoked the anger of John Hunyadi, who had meanwhile become governor of Hungary. He launched a swift invasion of Wallachia and had Vlad Dracul and Mircea captured and executed before the end of the year.

Hunyadi installed Vladislav II, a claimant from the Dănești branch, on the Wallachian throne. Vladislav subsequently accompanied him on another campaign against the Ottomans, which ended in their defeat by Murad at the Second Battle of Kosovo on 19 October 1448. Meanwhile, Murad had released Vlad Dracula from captivity, enabling him to seize the Wallachian throne with Ottoman support by 31 October. Before the end of the year, however, Vladislav defeated him and forced him into exile in Moldavia. Radu remained at the Ottoman court, where, according to the contemporary Byzantine historian Laonikos Chalkokondyles, he became the lover of Murad's son, Mehmed II. (Note: In his monograph on Chalkokondyles, the Byzantinist Anthony Kaldellis observes that the historian's "account of Mehmed is a checklist of attributes of a classical tyrant". Kaldellis erroneously refers to Vlad Dracula's brother and Mehmed's alleged lover as Dan rather than Radu.) Mehmed first reigned as sultan from 1444 to 1446, following his father's temporary abdication, and again from 1451, after Murad's death. Chalkokondyles recounts that Radu initially resisted Mehmed's sexual advances, even stabbing him in the thigh, but eventually yielded to them.

Meanwhile, following John Hunyadi's victory over Sultan Mehmed at the Siege of Belgrade, Radu's brother Vlad Dracula regained the Wallachian throne in August 1456, after Vladislav II was killed by discontented boyars. He soon faced two rival claimants, including his illegitimate brother Vlad the Monk, who established himself in Amlaș with the support of the burghers of Sibiu, a major Transylvanian Saxon town. Dracula subsequently purged the Wallachian boyars, curtailed the trading privileges of Transylvanian Saxon merchants, and refused to pay tribute to the Ottoman sultan. He also launched a plundering raid across the Danube into Ottoman territory, prompting Mehmed to assemble his largest army since the conquest of Constantinople. According to the historian Franz Babinger, the size of the army, which numbered more than 60,000 men, suggests that Mehmed intended to conquer Wallachia. Radu accompanied the sultan on the campaign, however, providing him with a potential "compliant pretender to the Wallachian throne" should the need arise.

The Ottoman army crossed the Danube into Wallachia at Vidin in June 1462, but Dracula launched a surprise night attack on Mehmed's camp, nearly reaching the sultan's tent. As the Ottomans subsequently approached the Wallachian capital, Târgoviște, they encountered a forest of stakes bearing the bodies of some 20,000 people, including high-ranking Ottoman officers, who had been impaled on Dracula's orders. Shortly afterwards, Mehmed abandoned the campaign and withdrew from Wallachia, leaving Radu at the Danubian port of Brăila and entrusting Mihaloğlu Ali Bey with supporting his claim to the Wallachian throne.

== Reign ==
=== Rise to power ===
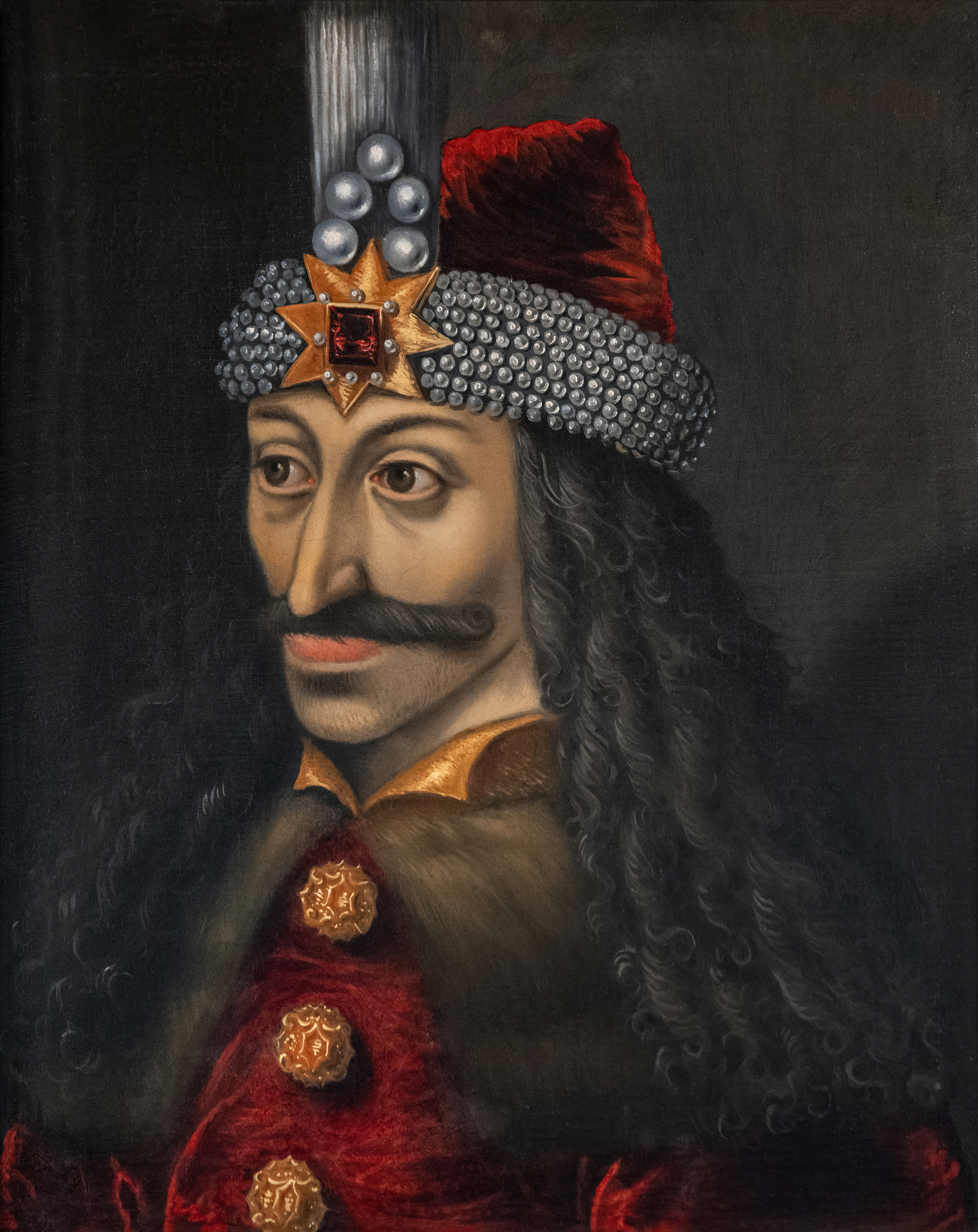
Radu's brother, Vlad the Impaler (or Dracula), Prince of Wallachia

The Venetian bailo (ambassador) in Constantinople, Domenico Balbi, reported that Sultan Mehmed II had left Radu in Brăila "to tempt the souls of the Wallachians who might wish to abandon Dracula". According to Chalkokondyles, Radu won the support of Wallachians who approached him to ransom their enslaved relatives and friends by reminding them of the sultan's power and his brother's cruelty; he also encouraged them to spread his message among their acquaintances. His efforts proved successful, and by July 1462 Wallachia had two rival voivodes, Dracula and Radu, whose forces frequently clashed. On 15th August, the deputy of the Count of the Székelys, a privileged community in eastern Transylvania, referred to a peace treaty concluded with "the Illustrious Prince Radu", suggesting that Matthias Corvinus, King of Hungary, had recognised Radu's rule. According to Cazacu, Radu's rule in Brăila reopened an important trade route for the Transylvanian Saxons, whose commercial interests had suffered considerably under Dracula's rule, thereby contributing to Corvinus's decision.

In early October, Dracula travelled to Transylvania to seek Corvinus's assistance, leaving Radu in full control of Wallachia. The negotiations lasted five weeks and culminated in Dracula's arrest on Corvinus's orders. Corvinus accused Dracula of having offered to assist the Ottomans in an invasion of Hungary, producing three letters allegedly written by Dracula to the sultan and other Ottoman leaders.

=== First reign ===
Seeking to establish an anti-Ottoman alliance, the Venetians instructed their envoy to Matthias Corvinus, Giovanni Aymo, to gather information about Dracula's arrest, Radu, and the latter's relationship with Corvinus. The findings of Aymo's investigation are unknown. Meanwhile, Radu had concluded a new agreement with the Ottomans, recognising the sultan's suzerainty and undertaking to pay an annual tribute of 10,000 ducats in return for Ottoman protection and the preservation of Wallachia's internal autonomy. The agreement served as a model for similar agreements concluded between Wallachia and the Ottoman Empire over the following eight decades. In 1464, departing from tradition, Corvinus granted Făgăraș and Amlaș not to Radu, but to two Hungarian noblemen, John Geréb of Vingárt and Stephen of Héderfája, respectively. In 1467, Corvinus regained possession of the two fiefs but once again declined to grant them to Radu, who responded by restricting the commercial activities of the Transylvanian Saxons in Wallachia. Eventually, in 1469, Corvinus granted him villages in Făgăraș.

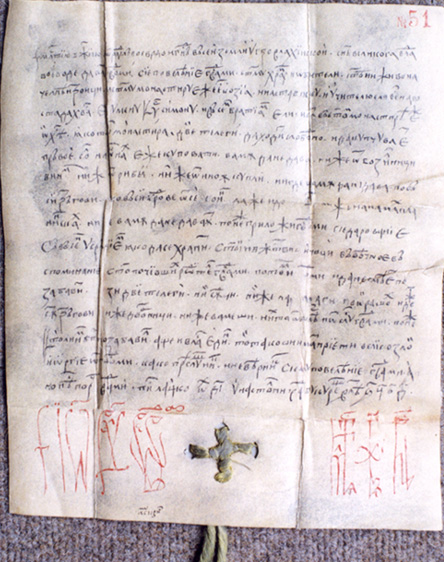
A royal charter issued by Radu the Handsome on 14 October 1465 containing the first reference to the Old Princely Court in Bucharest

Both Moldavia and Wallachia sought to control the lucrative trade routes originating at the ports of the Danube Delta. This rivalry led to a protracted conflict between Stephen the Great, Voivode of Moldavia, and Radu. The conflict was further complicated by Radu's status as an Ottoman vassal and Stephen's staunch opposition to the Ottomans. In 1465, Stephen captured Kiliia, expelling its Hungarian garrison. Four years later, Radu unsuccessfully attempted to recapture the port. The following year, Stephen attacked and destroyed Brăila. Radu planned an invasion of Moldavia, but Stephen anticipated the attack and defeated him at Soci, a now-abandoned settlement near Râmnicu Sărat, on 7 March 1471. Stephen subsequently sought a peace treaty and requested the mediation of Casimir IV of Poland. However, Radu continued preparations for renewed hostilities, constructing fortifications along the lower reaches of the Siret River.

In the autumn of 1473, raids into eastern Anatolia by Uzun Hasan, ruler of the Aq Qoyunlu ('White Sheep') tribal confederation, and his allies compelled Mehmed II to lead the bulk of the Ottoman army into the region. Taking advantage of the sultan's absence, Stephen invaded Wallachia, accompanied by Basarab Laiotă, a member of the Dănești branch and claimant to the Wallachian throne. Between 18 and 21 November, Stephen routed Radu at the Battle of the Vodna River, forcing him to seek refuge in the Dâmbovița Fortress in Bucharest. Stephen and Basarab attacked fortress on 23 November, prompting Radu to flee, leaving behind his family, treasury and banners.

=== Restorations and dethronements ===
According to Rezachevici, Radu probably fled towards the Danube following his defeat by Stephen the Great and Basarab Laiotă. Mihaloğlu Ali Bey soon intervened on Radu's behalf, leading his forces across the Danube into Wallachia, but was repulsed by Stephen on 28 November. Nevertheless, Radu returned at the head of an army comprising 17,000 Ottoman and 20,000 Wallachian troops, as recorded in the Moldavian–German Chronicle (1502). On 23 December, he defeated Basarab, forcing him to flee to Moldavia, and regained the Wallachian throne for the first time.

Basarab sought refuge in Moldavia, while Stephen launched another invasion of Wallachia in March 1474, only to abandon the campaign shortly afterwards owing to adverse weather conditions. Radu's subsequent illness enabled Basarab to return with Moldavian support, and by 10 August he had secured control over much of the principality. Radu withdrew to Giurgiu with the boyars who remained loyal to him, announcing his intention to launch a counter-offensive that same day. Although the precise circumstances remain unclear, the campaign proved successful, and by September Radu had regained the Wallachian throne for the second time, forcing Basarab once again to seek refuge in Moldavia. Stephen, however, remained determined to dislodge the pro-Ottoman ruler and invaded Wallachia again in October. After capturing a fortress on the river Teleajen, he restored Basarab to the throne by 5 October. According to Rezachevici, Radu probably fled across the Danube into Ottoman territory.

Basarab Laiotă faced a new challenger to the Wallachian throne in the person of Basarab the Young, also a member of the Dănești branch of the royal dynasty. In early October 1474, the latter led an army from Transylvania against his elder kinsman, but was repulsed by Basarab Laiotă with the support of Stephen the Great. Following Stephen's withdrawal to Moldavia, Basarab the Younger renewed his attempt to seize the throne and defeated Basarab Laiotă on 20 October. The Moldavian–German Chronicle records that Radu disappeared following the battle, "so that nobody knew what happened to him".

Meanwhile, Sultan Mehmed II appointed Hadım Suleiman Pasha, the governor of Rumelia, to lead a punitive expedition against Stephen the Great, whom he regarded as a recalcitrant vassal. Suleiman assembled an army of more than 100,000 men, joined by Radu with 17,000 Wallachian troops. Radu was restored to the Wallachian throne for the last time in November or December 1474. He subsequently took part in the Battle of Vaslui on 10 January 1475, in which Stephen inflicted a crushing defeat on Suleiman's forces. Radu remained in power for some time afterwards, but was deposed again under uncertain circumstances before 1 June, when Basarab Laiotă issued the earliest surviving charter of his fourth reign. Given that a remark by the Polish chronicler Jan Długosz is the sole source attesting to Radu's fourth reign, whereas Jakob Unrest's Austrian Chronicle identifies Basarab as the voivode of Wallachia at the time of Suleiman's campaign against Moldavia, the historian Liviu Cîmpeanu argues that it was Basarab Laiotă, rather than Radu, who assumed power in Wallachia with Ottoman support in November or December 1474.

== Death ==
The date and circumstances of Radu's death remain uncertain. The contemporary Austrian chronicler Jakob Unrest records that an unidentified voivode led an army of 8,000 soldiers from Ottoman territory into Wallachia in early 1475, where he was killed by Basarab Laiotă. According to Rezachevici, the identification of this voivode with Radu is unlikely. The later Polish-Lithuanian chronicler Maciej Stryjkowski states that, in 1477, the burghers of Brașov handed Radu over to Stephen the Great. However, this account is not corroborated by nearly contemporary Moldavian sources.

Radu's last surviving document, a letter addressed to the burghers of Brașov in 1475, indicates that he was then in Transylvania. In the letter, Radu affirmed his loyalty to the king of Hungary and rebuked the burghers for detaining boyars loyal to him who had fled Wallachia. He also protested against the burghers' confiscation of horses that the boyars had previously seized from one of his opponents, Udrişte of Mărgineni. Radu demanded the release of the detained boyars and the return of the horses, threatening to lodge a complaint with the Voivode of Transylvania if the burghers failed to comply. The place of his burial is unknown.

== Family ==
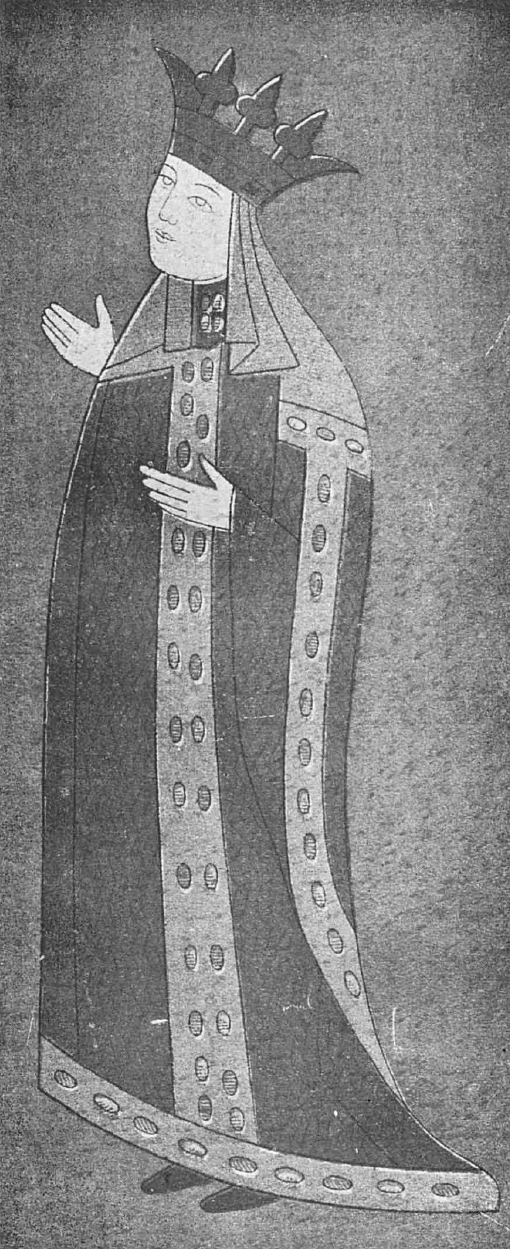
Maria Despina, Radu's wife, depicted on an embroidered liturgical curtain at Putna Monastery

Radu's wife is named Maria Despina in the Anonymous Chronicle of Moldavia. According to Cazacu, she was related to the Branković dynasty, which ruled Serbia, whilst the historian Ștefan S. Gorovei identifies her as a daughter of the Albanian nobleman Gjergj Arianiti. Following his victory over Radu at the Battle of the Vodna River in November 1473, Stephen the Great captured Maria Despina and her daughter, Maria Voichița, Radu's only known child. Stephen subsequently married Maria Voichița on 19 December 1477.

== Legacy ==
No portrait of Radu is known to have survived. As late as the 18th century, he was still referred to as Radu the Great; the epithet "the Handsome", referring to his reputed good looks, was bestowed upon him only later. Contemporary historical documents portray Radu as a capable administrator who paid particular attention to the economic interests of his country. By contrast, the 17th-century Cantacuzino Chronicle devotes barely a sentence to his reign, recording little more than his name, his foundation of Tânganu Monastery near Bucharest, and the length of his rule.

A considerably more elaborate, though highly idealised, portrayal emerges in Nicolae D. Popescu's historical novel Radu allu III-lea cellu Frumosu (Radu III the Handsome), published in 1864. Popescu presents the voivode in an overwhelmingly favourable light, praising his peaceful rule for having brought "the fairest fruits to a country exhausted by the countless wars that had preceded his reign". Reflecting the author's nationalist outlook, Radu is also endowed with exceptional physical beauty, which Popescu characterises as "purely Romanian". In 20th-century historical fiction, Radu remained a relatively marginal figure. One of his few literary appearances is in Alexandru Mitru's novel Săgeata căpitanului Ion (Captain Ion's Arrow), which was adapted into a film of the same title in 1972. Portrayed by Ștefan Velniciuc, Radu appears in the film as a politically weak, hesitant, and cowardly ruler.

Chalkokondyles' account of Radu's youth at the Ottoman court has influenced modern film and television portrayals, including the second season of the Netflix historical docudrama Rise of Empires: Ottoman, which depicts the conflict between Mehmed II and Vlad Dracula. Radu is portrayed in the series by the Turkish actor Ali Gözüşirin. Doru Pop, a professor of theatre and film studies, has criticised the season for what he considers its pro-Ottoman bias, including its failure to portray Mehmed as a sexual abuser in his relationship with Radu. Radu has also featured in the vampire mythology associated with his brother. In Ted Nicolaou's Subspecies (1991), he is portrayed as a Nosferatu-like figure who, alongside a fictional half-human son of Vlad Dracula, confronts two American students visiting Romania.

== Sources ==
- Babinger, Franz (1978). Mehmed the Conqueror and his Time. Translated by Ralph Manheim. Princeton University Press. ISBN 978-0-691-09900-2.
- Cazacu, Matei (2017). Dracula. BRILL. ISBN 978-90-04-34725-0.
- Cîmpeanu, Liviu (2014). "Basarab Laiotă, domn al Ţării Româneşti: preliminarii la o monografie" [Basarab Laiotǎ, Ruler of Wallachia: Preliminaries to a Monograph] (PDF). Studii și Materiale de Istorie Medie (in Romanian). XXXII. Academia Românǎ, Institutul de Istorie "Nicolae Iorga": 145–172. ISSN 1222-4766.
- Eagles, Jonathan (2014). Stephen the Great and Balkan Nationalism: Moldova and Eastern European History. I.B. Tauris. ISBN 978-1-78076-353-8.
- Gorovei, Ştefan S. (2006). "Maria Despina, doamna lui Radu cel Frumos" [Maria Despina, the Wife of Radu the Handsome]. ؘAnalele Putnei (in Romanian). II (1–2). Centrul de Cercetare și Documentare "Ștefan cel Mare" al Sfintei Mănășteri Putna: 145–152. ISSN 1841-625X.
- Eskenasy, Victor (1977). "O precizare asupra politicii externe a Ţarii Românesti in vremea lui Radu cel Frumos" [A Clarification Concerning Wallachia's Foreign Policy During the Reign of Radu the Fair]. Revista de Istorie (in Romanian). 30. Academia de Științe Sociale și Politice a Republicii Socialiste România: 1665–1667. ISSN 0251-3099.
- Florescu, George D. (1991). "Appendix I: A Genealogy of the Family of Vlad Țepeș". In Treptow, Kurt W. (ed.). Dracula: Essays on the Life and Times of Vlad Țepeș. East European Monographs. Vol. 1833. Columbia University Press. pp. 249–252. ISBN 978-0-88033-220-0.
- Kaldellis, Anthony (2014). A New Herodotos: Laonikos Chalkokondyles on the Ottoman Empire, the Fall of Byzantium, and the Emergence of the West. Supplements to the Dumbarton Oaks Medieval Library. Vol. 33–34. Harvard University Press. ISBN 978-0-88402-401-9.
- Martin, Anca Simina (2026). "The Vampire in Late Communist Cinema: from Internal Enemy to Foreign Threat". Studies in East European Thought. 78 (3). Springer Nature: 657–673. doi:10.1007/s11212-025-09734-w. ISSN 0925-9392.
- Neculae, Marius (2011). "Bǎtǎlia de la Soci din 1471: Localizare. Diferite tendințe în istoriografia secolului XX" [The Battle of Soci in 1471: Its Location. Different Trends in Twentieth-Century Historiography]. Analele Buzăului (in Romanian). III. Muzeul Județean Buzău: 23–26. ISSN 2065-5304.
- Pop, Ioan-Aurel (2005). "Romanians in the 14th–16th Centuries: From the "Christian Republic" to the "Restoration of Dacia"". In Pop, Ioan-Aurel; Bolovan, Ioan (eds.). History of Romania: Compendium. Romanian Cultural Institute (Center for Transylvanian Studies). pp. 209–314. ISBN 978-973-7784-12-4.
- Rezachevici, Constantin (2001). Cronologia critică a domnilor din Țara Românească și Moldova: a. 1324-1881 [A Critical Chronology of the Rulers of Wallachia and Moldavia, 1324–1881]. Vol. I. Editura Enciclopedică. ISBN 978-973-45-0387-2.
- Varga, Dragoș (2025). "Popularizarea trecutului: N. D. Popescu și romanul istoric pentru marele public" [Popularizing the Past: N. D. Popescu and the Mass-Market Historical Novel]. ؘTransilvania (in Romanian). 11. Complexul Național Muzeal "Astra" Sibiu: 38–44. ISSN 0255-0539.
- Zănescu, Ionel (2009). "București la a 550-a aniversare documentară" [Bucharest on the 550th Anniversary of Its First Documentary Attestation] (PDF). București: Materiale de Istorie și Muzeografie (in Romanian). XXIII. Muzeul Municipiului București: 138–144. ISBN 978-973-88890-1-9.

Radu the Handsome House of Drăculeşti Born: 1437/1439 Died: 1475
Regnal titles
Preceded by Vlad III Dracula	Voivode of Wallachia; 1462–1473	Succeeded by Basarab Laiotă cel Bătrân
Preceded by Basarab Laiotă cel Bătrân	Voivode of Wallachia; 1473–1474	Succeeded by Basarab Laiotă cel Bătrân
Preceded by Basarab Laiotă cel Bătrân	Voivode of Wallachia; 1474	Succeeded by Basarab Laiotă cel Bătrân
Preceded by Basarab Laiotă cel Bătrân	Voivode of Wallachia; 1474–1475	Succeeded by Basarab Laiotă cel Bătrân
