= Maria Despina =

Albanian princess of the Arianiti family

Maria Despina Maria Arianiti
- Princess Consort of Wallachia
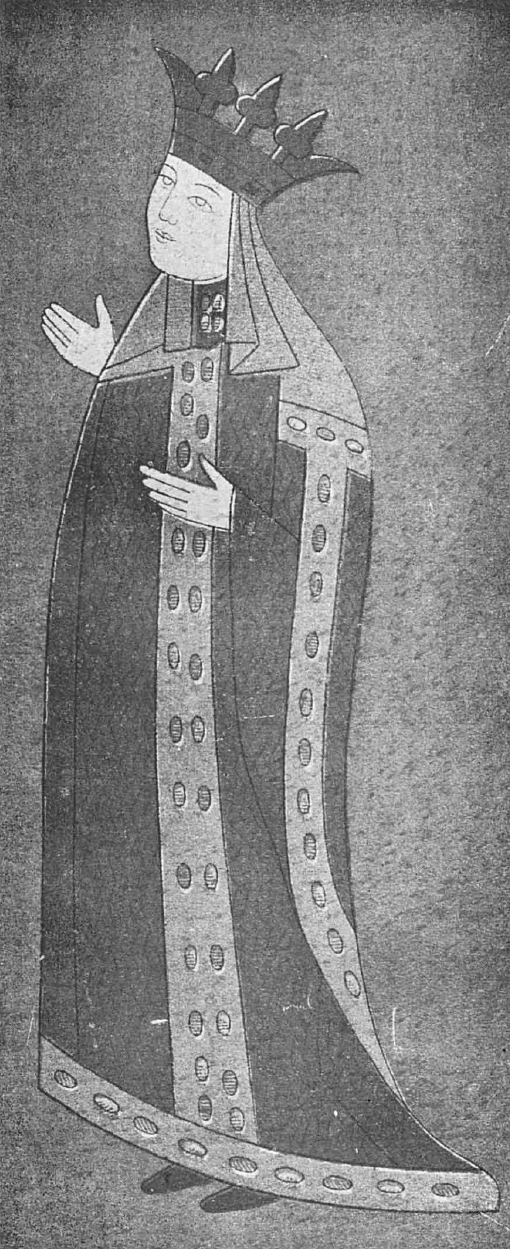
- Depiction of Maria Despina at Putna Monastery

Princess Consort of Wallachia
- Tenure: c. 1462 – January 1475
- Born: c. 1440s
- Died: 11 May 1500; Principality of Moldavia
- Burial: May 1500; Putna Monastery
- Spouse: Radu the Handsome
- Issue: Maria Voichița
- House: House of Arianiti (by birth); House of Drăculești (by marriage)
- Father: Gjergj Arianiti
- Mother: Possibly Maria Muzaka
- Religion: Eastern Orthodox

Maria Despina (Albanian: Maria Arianiti; c. 1440–11 May 1500), also known as Doamna Maria or Mary, was an Albanian princess who became Princess Consort of Wallachia through her marriage to Radu the Handsome. She was the daughter of Prince Gjergj Arianiti, a leading figure in the anti-Ottoman resistance in Albania. Captured during the Moldavian invasion of Wallachia in 1473, she spent the remainder of her life in Moldavia, where she became the mother-in-law of Stephen the Great and was later buried at Putna Monastery.

== Life and marriage ==
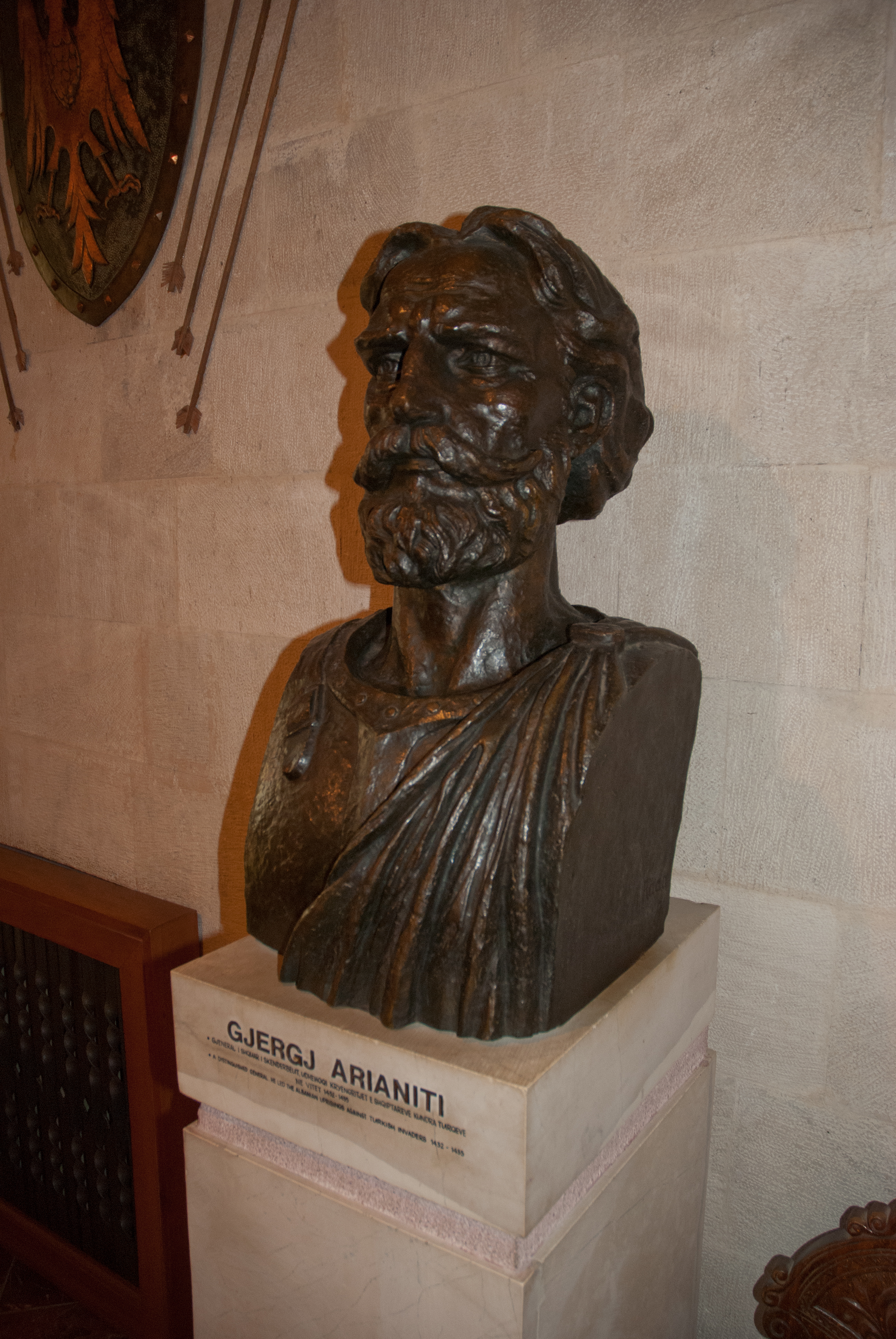
Bust of her father Gjergj Arianiti

Maria, born around the 1440s, was the daughter of Gjergj Arianiti, a prominent Albanian noble and military leader active in the resistance against the Ottoman Empire. The identity of her mother is unknown, although her father was married to Maria Muzaka, daughter of Andrea III Muzaka, but it is not explicitly stated whether she was Maria’s mother. One source identifies Maria as the sister of Angjelina Arianiti, whose mother was Maria Muzaka, and, since it does not distinguish them as half-siblings, this strengthens the claim that Maria Muzaka was also Maria Despina’s mother. Beyond these familial ties, details of Maria's early life remain scarce.

Maria Despina married Radu the Handsome, Prince of Wallachia, around 1462, likely at the beginning of his reign. During her tenure as princess consort, Wallachia was a contested frontier principality, caught between Ottoman influence and regional powers. On 24 November 1473, Stephen the Great of Moldavia launched a decisive campaign against Radu, defeating his forces and briefly taking control of Wallachia. As a result, Maria Despina and her daughter Maria Voichița were captured and brought to Moldavia.

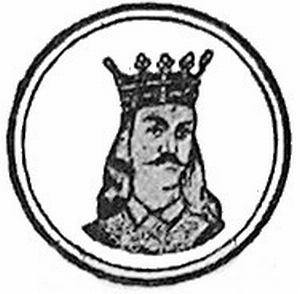
Radu the Handsome

According to the Anonymous Chronicle of Moldavia, on 24 November 1473, after occupying Bucharest, Stephen the Great: "took also the wife of Voivode Radu and his daughter, who was his only born child, along with all his treasures, all his garments, and all his flags."

Following their capture, Maria Despina and her daughter were held in Moldavia, where they became part of the Moldavian princely court. Despite her origins as Wallachian princess consort, historical records about her life and role largely emerge from Moldavian sources, reflecting her changed circumstances after 1473. Although Radu the Handsome regained the Wallachian throne multiple times, there is no record of him requesting the return of his wife and daughter. However, each regain of the throne was for a short period with ongoing conflict and he had died by 1475. Maria Despina and her daughter remained in Moldavia until their deaths.

In 1478, five years after her capture, Maria Despina’s daughter, Maria Voichița, married Stephen the Great as his third wife.

== Later life and death ==
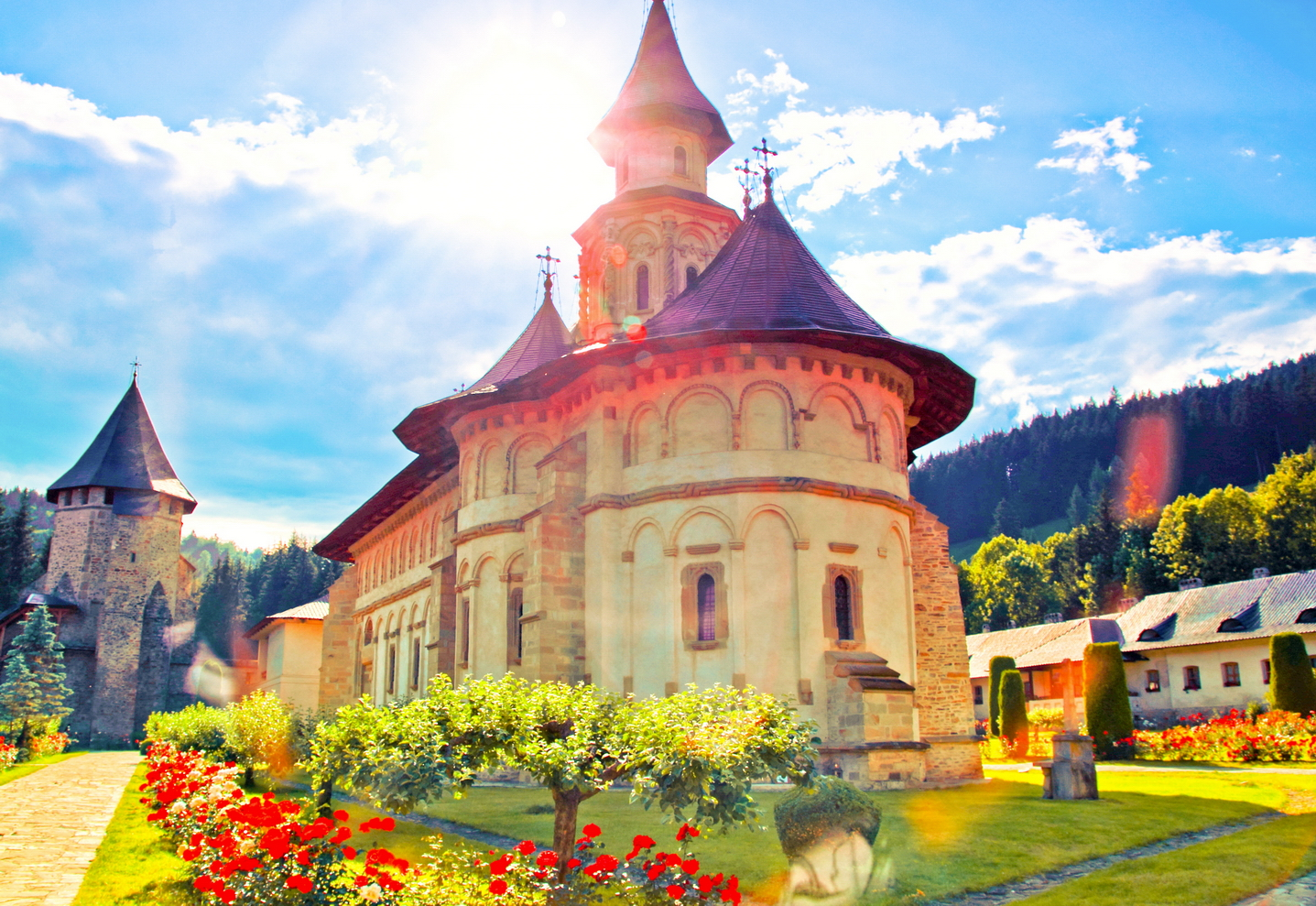
Putna Monastery, where Maria Despina was buried

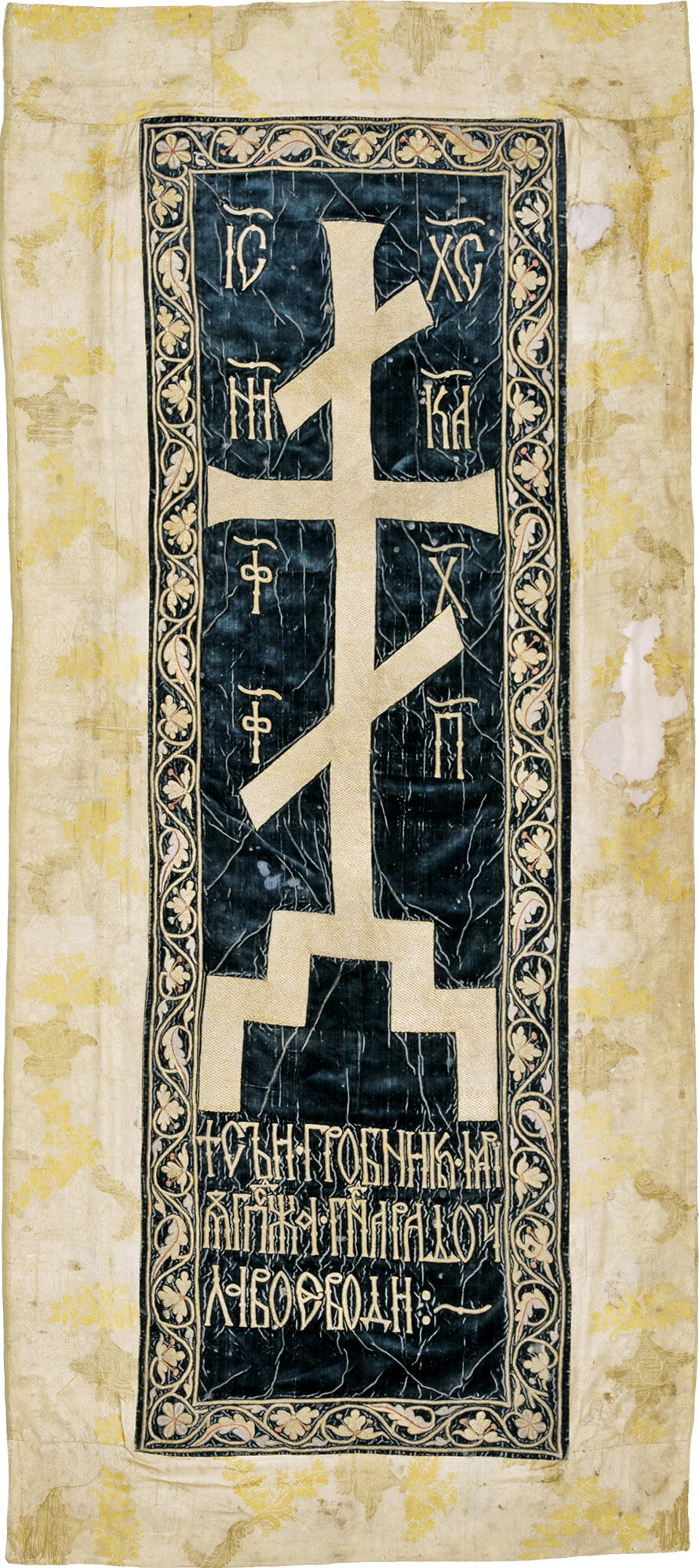
Grave cover of Maria Despina at Putna Monastery

After her capture in 1473, Maria Despina lived at the Moldavian court for over 26 years. She eventually retired to monastic life and was buried wearing the garb of a nun. According to Moldavian chronicles, she died on May 11, 1500, and was buried with honor at Putna Monastery. Although her tomb has been lost, her inscribed tomb cover remains, and she is remembered in the necrology of Bistrița Monastery.

== Origins and historical debate ==
The origins of Maria Despina, wife of Radu the Handsome, are uncertain and have been debated by historians. Early views placed her in the Serbian nobility due to the title “Despina,” but later theories suggested possible Byzantine imperial ancestry linked to the Asan and Palaiologos families. However, these connections were mostly disproven. The most supported theory, proposed by historian Ștefan S. Gorovei, identifies her as a daughter of the Albanian noble Gjergj Arianiti, connecting her to a prominent Albanian family that resisted the Ottoman Empire. Archival documents from the 1470s refer to "Despina" in relation to Albania, supporting this view. This Albanian origin also helps explain Moldavian ruler Stephen the Great’s support for the Albanian Tower, as documents from the Serbian Orthodox Hilandar archives show that Stephen and his wife Maria donated to it.

== Family ==
Maria Despina married Radu the Handsome. The couple had one child:

- Maria Voichița, Princess consort of Moldavia married Stephen the Great

== Family tree ==
Ancestors of Maria Despina

8. Unknown
4. Komnen Arianiti
9. Unknown
2. Gjergj Arianiti
10. Nikollë Zaharia
5. Lady of Zaharia
11. Unknown
1. Maria Despina
12. Gjin I Muzaka
6. Andrea III Muzaka
13. Zanfina Arianiti Comninata
3. Maria Muzaka
14. Gjon Zenebishi
7. Chiranna Zenevisi, Lady of Grabossa
15. Unknown

== See also ==
- Arianiti family

== Bibliography ==
- Eagles, Jonathan (2013). Stephen the Great and Balkan Nationalism Moldova and Eastern European History. Bloomsbury Publishing. ISBN 978-0-8577-3458-7.
- Elsie, Robert (2003). Early Albania A Reader of Historical Texts, 11th-17th Centuries. Harrassowitz. ISBN 978-3-4470-4783-8.
- Gorovei, Ștefan S. (2006). Maria Despina, doamna lui Radu cel Frumos [Maria Despina, the wife of Radu the Beautiful] (in Romanian).
- Sainty, Guy Stair (2018). The Constantinian Order of Saint George and the Angeli, Farnese and Bourbon families which governed it. Boletín Oficial del Estado. ISBN 978-8-4340-2506-6.
- Stankovic, Vlada (2016). The Balkans and the Byzantine World Before and After the Captures of Constantinople, 1204 and 1453. Lexington Books. ISBN 978-1-4985-1326-5.
- Sullivan, Alice (2017). The Painted Fortified Monastic Churches of Moldavia: Bastions of Orthodoxy in a Post-Byzantine World. University of Michigan.
- Székely, Maria Magdalena (2012). Născută spre a fi doamnă: Maria, ultima soție a lui Ștefan cel Mare [Born to be a lady: Maria, the last wife of Stephen the Great] (in Romanian).
