= Teoctist I of Moldavia =

Teoctist I of Moldavia (ca. 1410–November 18, 1477 or 1478) was a Moldavian cleric of the Eastern Orthodox Church.

Teoctist was probably tonsured a monk and served as starets at Neamț Monastery, which at the time was the country's most prominent. According to Nicolae Iorga, he was the son of a boyar and seemingly related to the princely family, given his extensive involvement in state affairs. A powerful and respected figure, he was also educated, and helped advance Slavonic culture in Moldavia. Iorga too theorized Teoctist's ties to Neamț, a leading center of learning and a refuge for the Slavonic milieu, which the Ottoman conquest had repressed in Bulgaria and Serbia.

Elected Metropolitan of Moldavia in 1453, during the reign of Prince Alexăndrel, he was ordained at Peć by Serbian Patriarch Nikodim II. It is believed his investiture was not performed domestically because at least one other Moldavian see was vacant, so there was no available quorum. The ongoing Fall of Constantinople ruled out ordination there. Moreover, relations with Constantinople were strained because the previous occupant, Ioachim, sent by that church, was favorable to the Union of Florence, and had been forced to flee his throne. Finally, as Moldavia objected to the union, its leadership appreciated the fact that the Serbian church had sent no delegates to the council.

In 1457, Teoctist anointed Stephen III as prince. A member of the royal council, Teoctist is frequently mentioned in the documents of Stephen's reign. Altogether, there are some sixty separate references, beginning in 1455 under Peter III Aaron and ending in 1475, after the Battle of Vaslui. In September 1470, he consecrated Putna Monastery. There and at Neamț, he led groups of monks who copied manuscripts. He is buried in the vestibule of the monastery church at Putna. This indicates Stephen's great esteem for the metropolitan, and perhaps his blood ties to the ruling Mușatin family. Over the ensuing three centuries, Teoctist appears in histories by a number of authors: the Chronicle of Putna, as well as works by Grigore Ureche, Nicolae Costin and Vartolomei Măzăreanu.
