= Maria Voichița =

Moldavian princess (d. 1511)

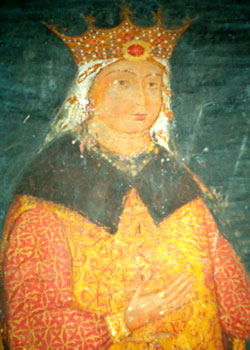

Princess Consort of Moldavia
- Reign: 1480–1511
- Predecessor: Maria of Mangup
- Burial: Putna Monastery, Romania
- Spouse: Stephen the Great
- Issue: Bogdan III the One-Eyed; Maria Cneajna
- House: House of Drăculești (by birth); House of Bogdan-Mușat (by marriage)
- Father: Radu the Handsome
- Mother: Maria Despina
- Religion: Eastern Orthodoxy

Maria Voichița (c. 1463 – 26 February 1511) was the daughter of a voivode of Wallachia. Later, she became princess consort of Moldavia.

== Life ==
Born into the powerful House of Drăculești, Maria was daughter of Radu III the Handsome and his wife, Maria Despina, who was the daughter of Gjergj Arianiti and Maria Muzaka. When she was born is not known; however, her parents appear to have married sometime before 1463 and she was wed in 1478, making her birth year 1462 at the very earliest, but more likely 1463 or 1464. She was niece of Vlad the Impaler.

She married Prince Stephen III of Moldavia in 1478. This marriage linked Stephen to the ruling family of Wallachia, and opened the possibility that he might later claim that throne. Maria gave birth to their son, Bogdan III, on 18 March 1479. She may have had one or two daughters with Stephen as well, and potentially other sons.

She was regarded to have an influence upon the policy of her spouse. Additionally, she was a patron of the arts and church; for example, she is recorded as having commissioned a manuscript for the monastery of Pătrăuți.

She is buried in the Putna Monastery, Romania.

== Issue ==
- Bogdan III the One-Eyed, Voivode of Moldavia.
- Maria Cneajna, who married to Fedor Wiśniowiecki (d. 1533).

== Sources ==
- George Marcu (coord.), Dicționarul personalităţilor feminine din România, Editura Meronia, București, 2009.
- Gorovei, Ştefan S. (2006). "Maria Despina, doamna lui Radu cel Frumos" [Maria Despina, the wife of Radu the Beautiful]. Analele Putnei (in Romanian). II (1–2): 145–152 – via Central and Eastern European Online Library.
