= Putna Monastery =

Romanian Orthodox monastery

Coordinates: 47°51′57.6″N 25°35′47.5″E

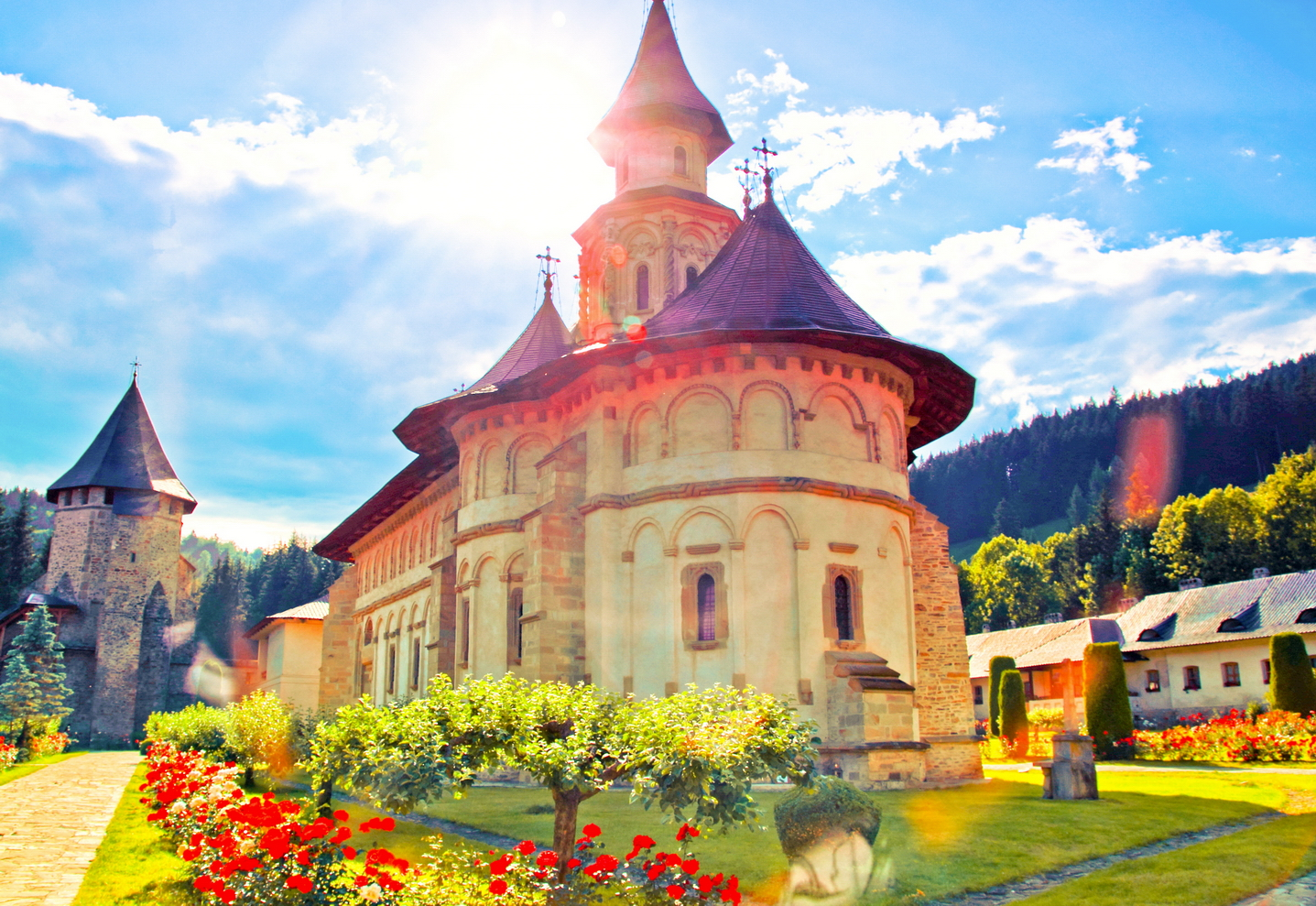

Religion
- Affiliation: Romanian Orthodox Church

Location
- Location: Putna, Suceava County, Romania
- Interactive map of Putna Monastery

Architecture
- Style: Moldavian
- Groundbreaking: 1466
- Materials: stone, brick

Website
- http://www.putna.ro

The Putna monastery (Romanian: Mănăstirea Putna) is a Romanian Orthodox monastery (one of the most important cultural religious and artistic centers established in medieval Moldavia); as with many others, it was built and dedicated by Stephen the Great. Putna was founded on the lands perambulated by the Putna, which has its source in the Obcina Mare mountains, Bukovina. Stephen the Great is famous for building and influencing the building of dozens of churches and monasteries all over Moldavia. Allegedly, he founded a religious edifice after each important military victory. The Putna Monastery houses the tombs of Stephen (nowadays a place of pilgrimage) and several of his family members. The icon veils and tombstones are held as fine examples of Moldavian art in Stephen the Great's time.

The Putna monastery is also the starting point of the Via Transilvanica long-distance trail.

== History ==
Right after Stephen the Great won the battle in which he conquered the Kilia citadel, he began work on the monastery as a means to give thanks to God, on July 10, 1466 – the church was to be dedicated to the Virgin Mary. Previous eremitic life (on the place the monastery was built) was proven by humans buried deep under the foundation of the oldest buildings from Stephen the Great. A chronicle of the time mentions that Stephen bought the Vicovu de Sus village in exchange for 200 zloty, and awarded the land and revenue to the treasury of the monastery.

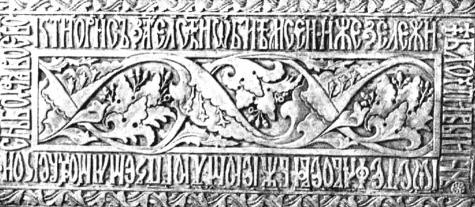
Stephen the Great's tombstone at Putna is where he, together with his third wife Maria Voichita, is interred.

Putna was completed in three years, but was consecrated only after one more year passed, given that the Moldavians engaged in other battles. On September 3, 1470, during a ceremony attended by Stephen and all his family, the monastery was consecrated by Metropolitan Teoctist, and subsequently became the most important religious site in the area.

The present church was practically rebuilt between 1653 and 1662 by Vasile Lupu and his successors. Although the building follows the ground plan of a typical 15th and 16th century Moldavian church, it has many architectural and decorative features that are characteristic of 17th century architecture.

For long, the site was believed to have been designed by a Greek architect named Theodor - the interpretation of the Kilia chronicles on which this was based has since been proven wrong.

The oldest embroidery of the monastery, dated at the end of the 14th century, is an epitaphion made with silk and gold thread by Euphima, a Serbian nun who was the daughter of Vojihna, and her daughter, Euprasijka.

== Burials ==
- Stephen III of Moldavia
- Bogdan III the One-Eyed
- Maria of Mangup
- Maria Despina
- Maria Voichița
- Teoctist I of Moldavia
- Zoe Dumitrescu-Bușulenga
- Alexandrina Cernov

== Gallery ==
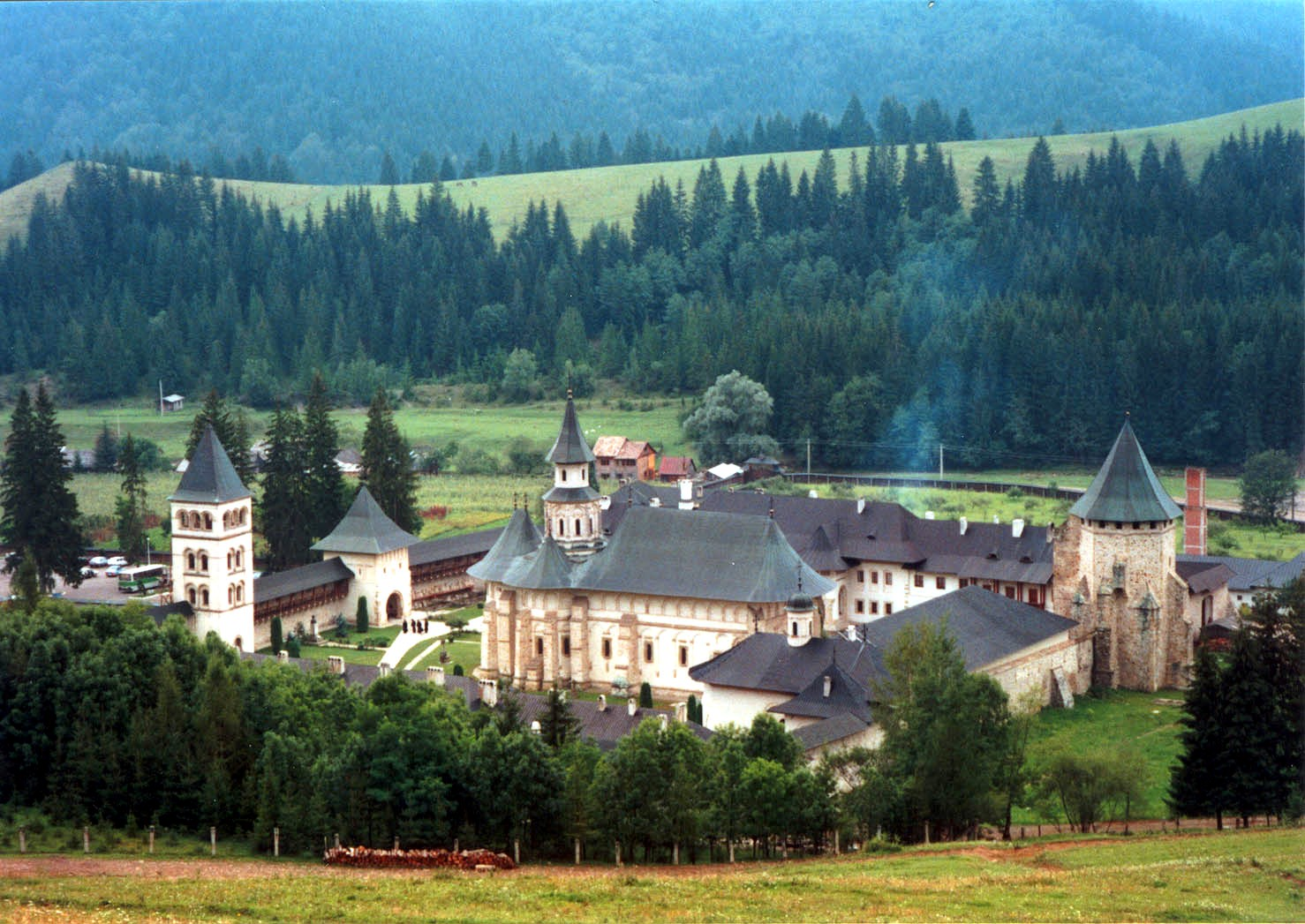

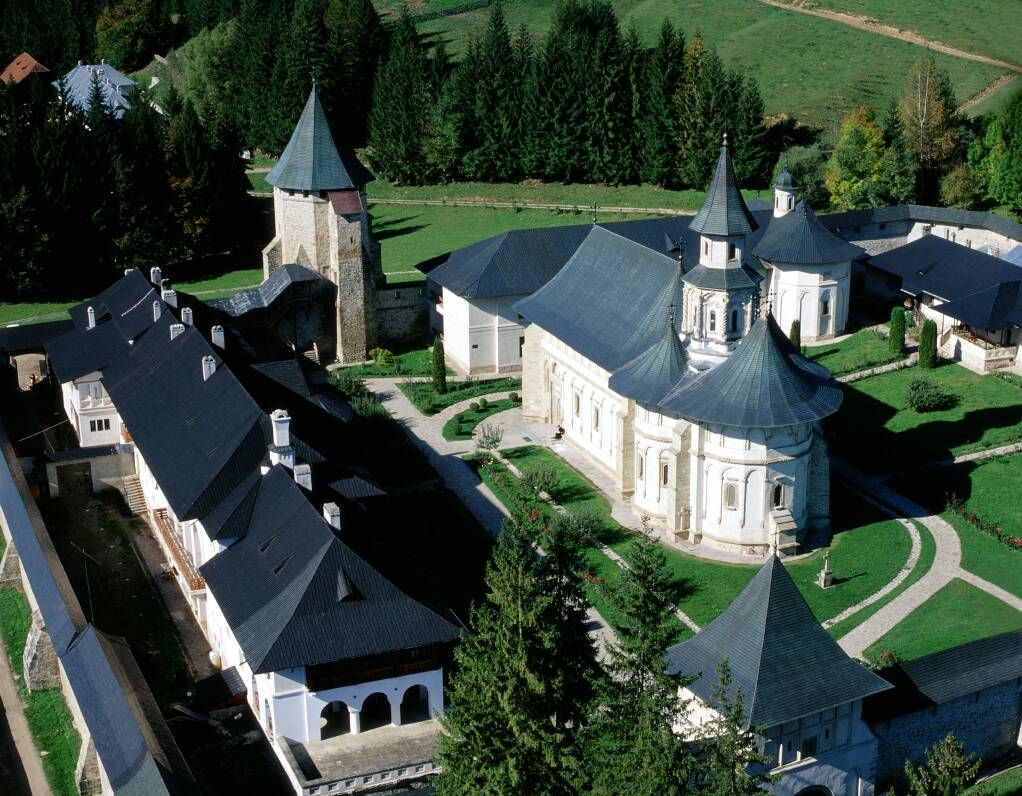

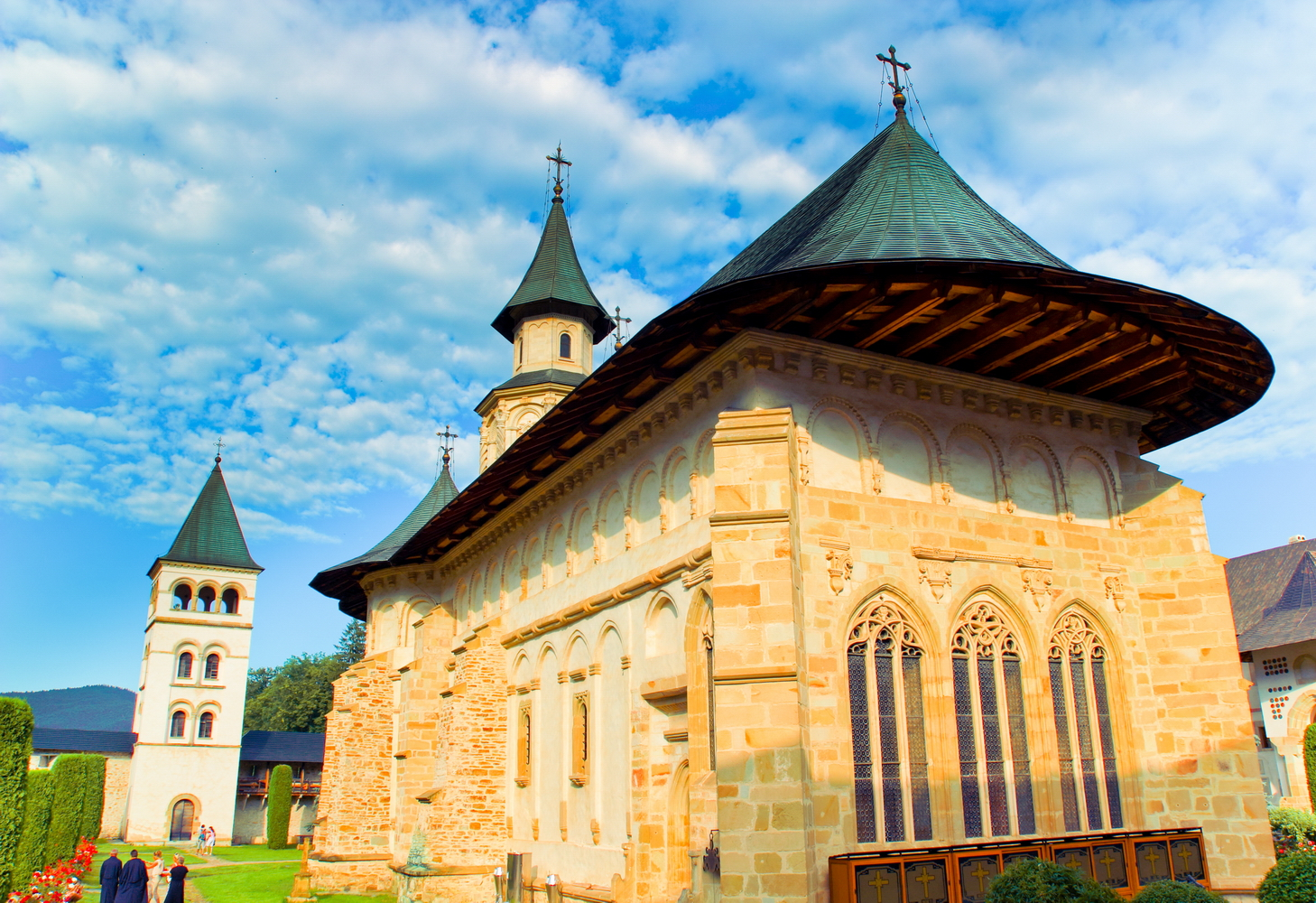

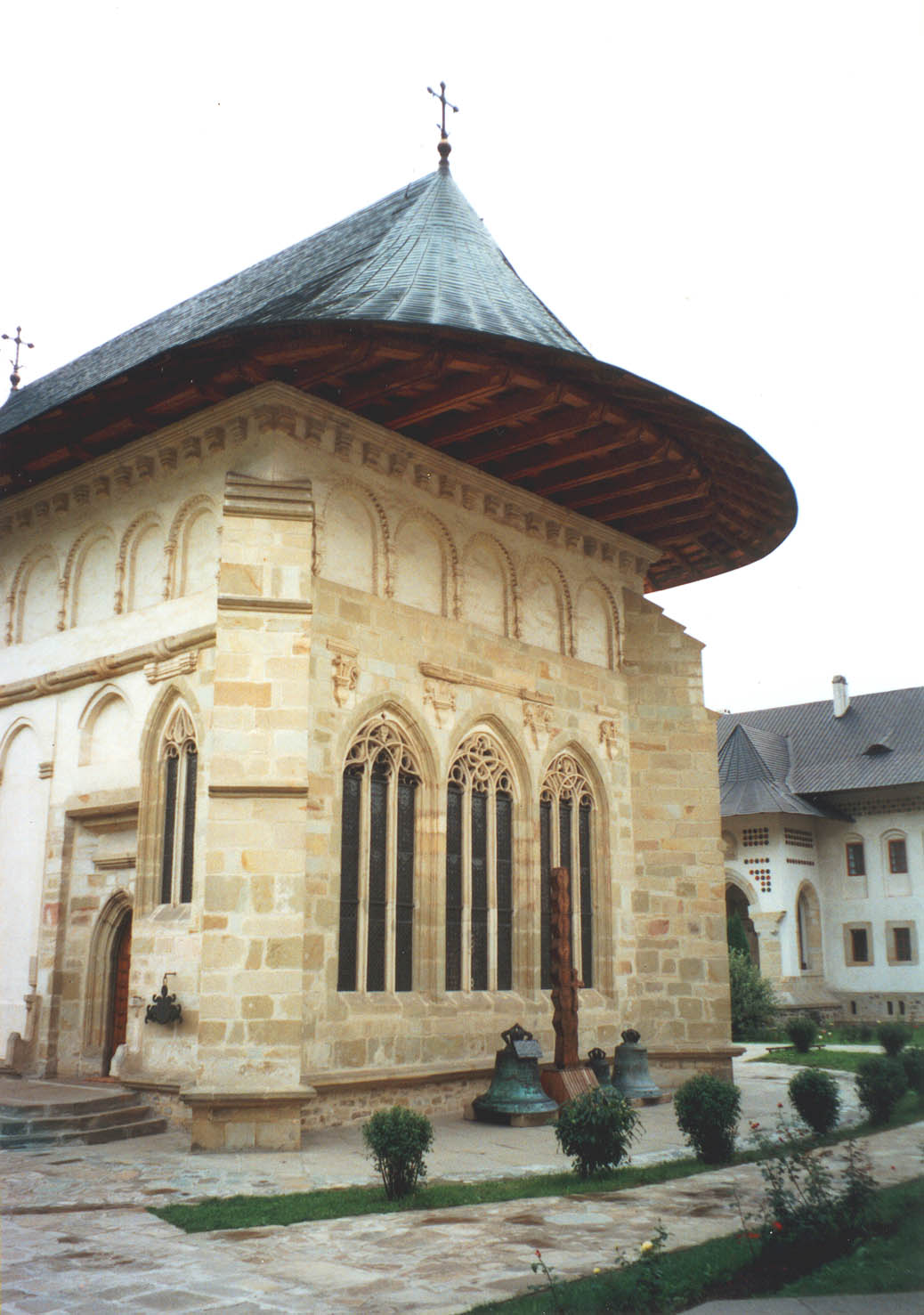
Putna Monastery

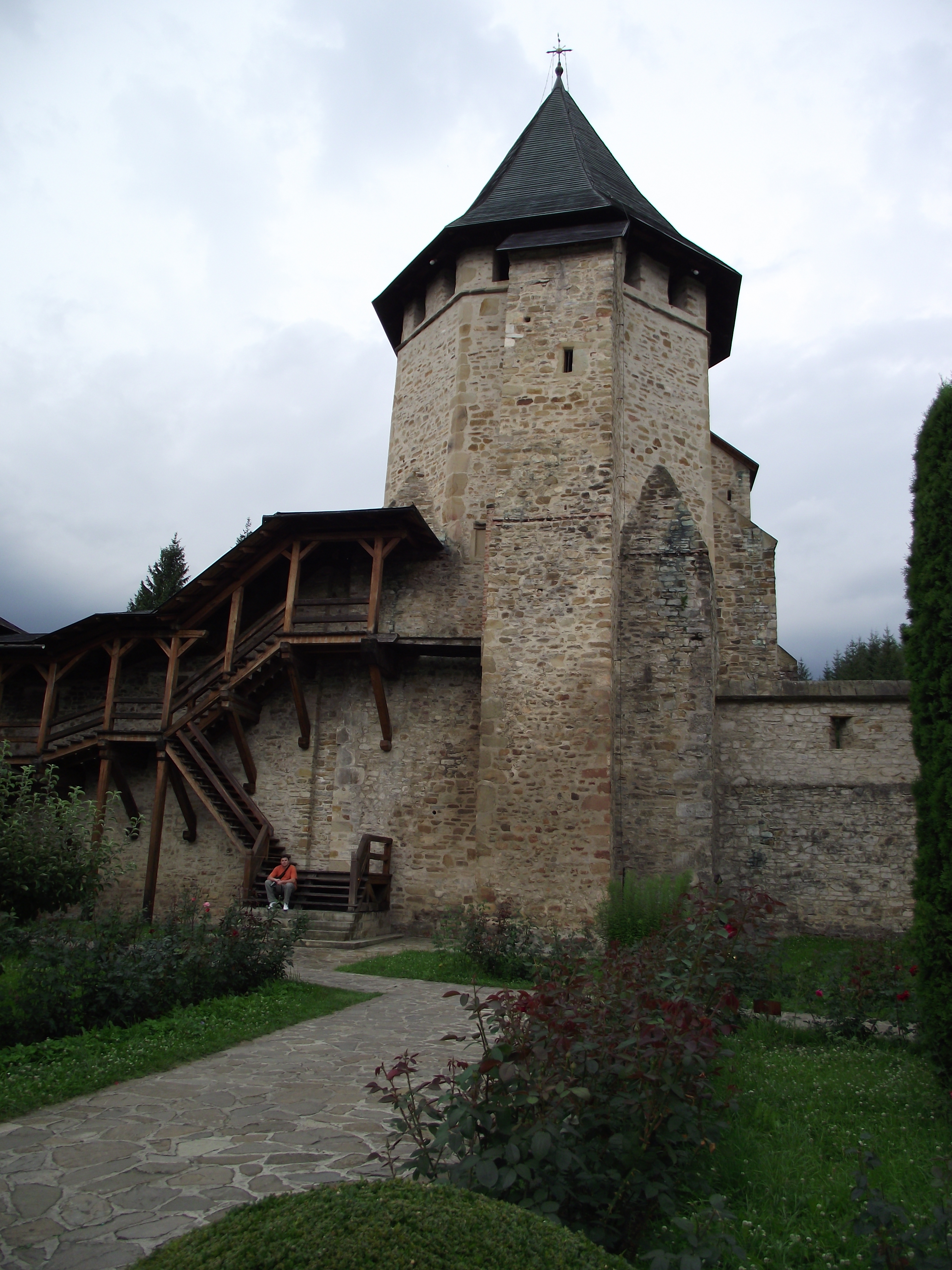

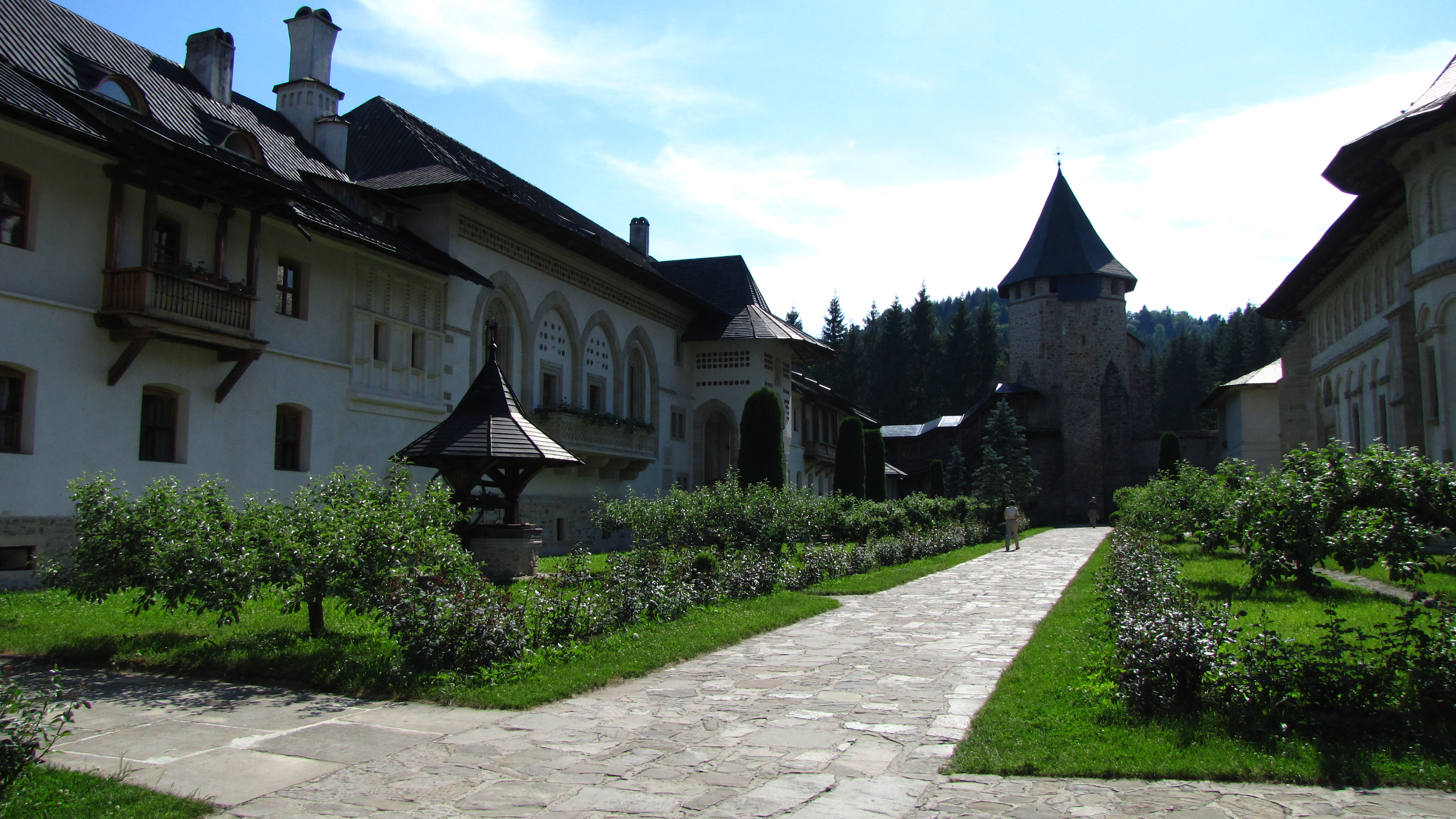

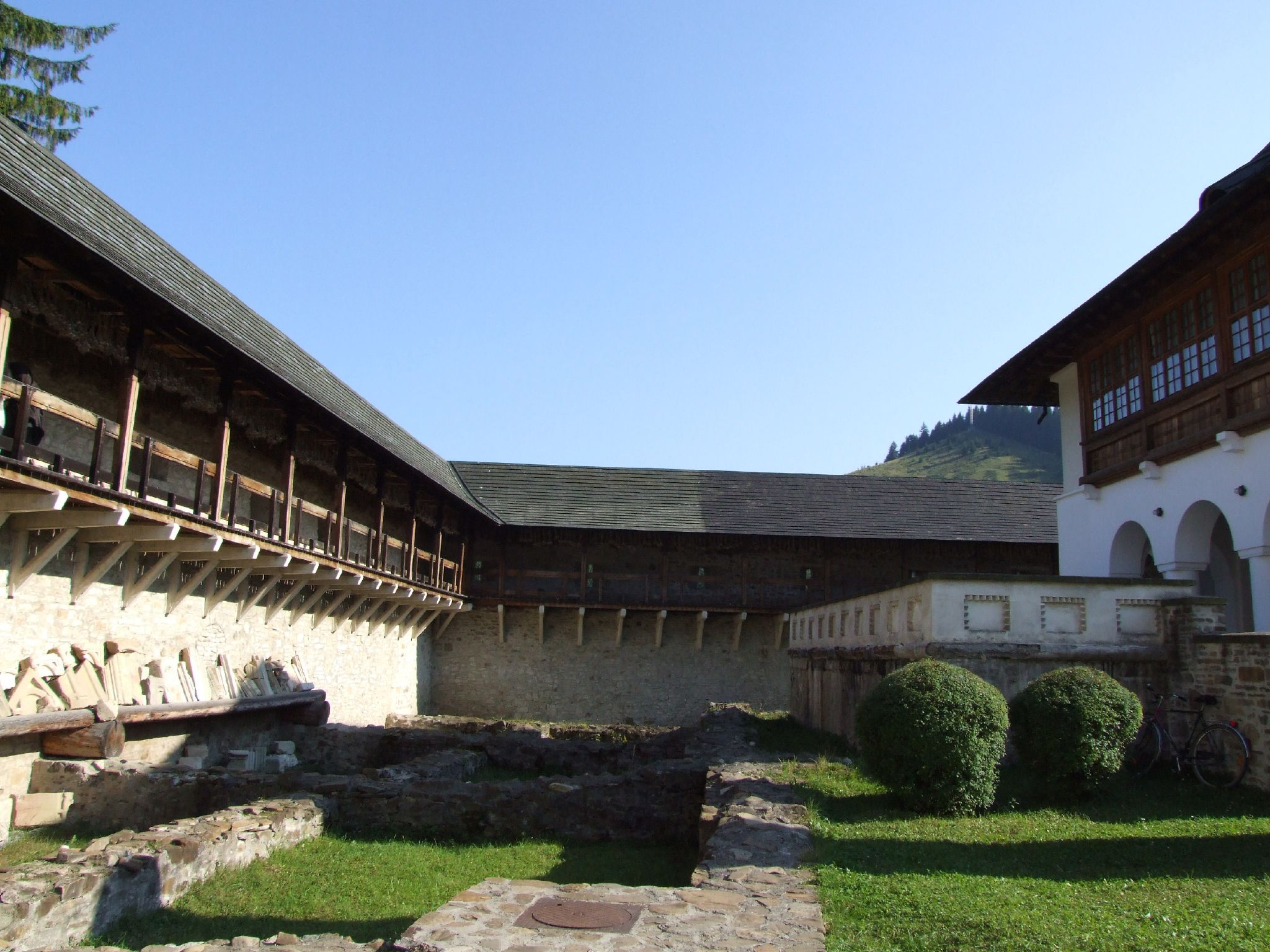

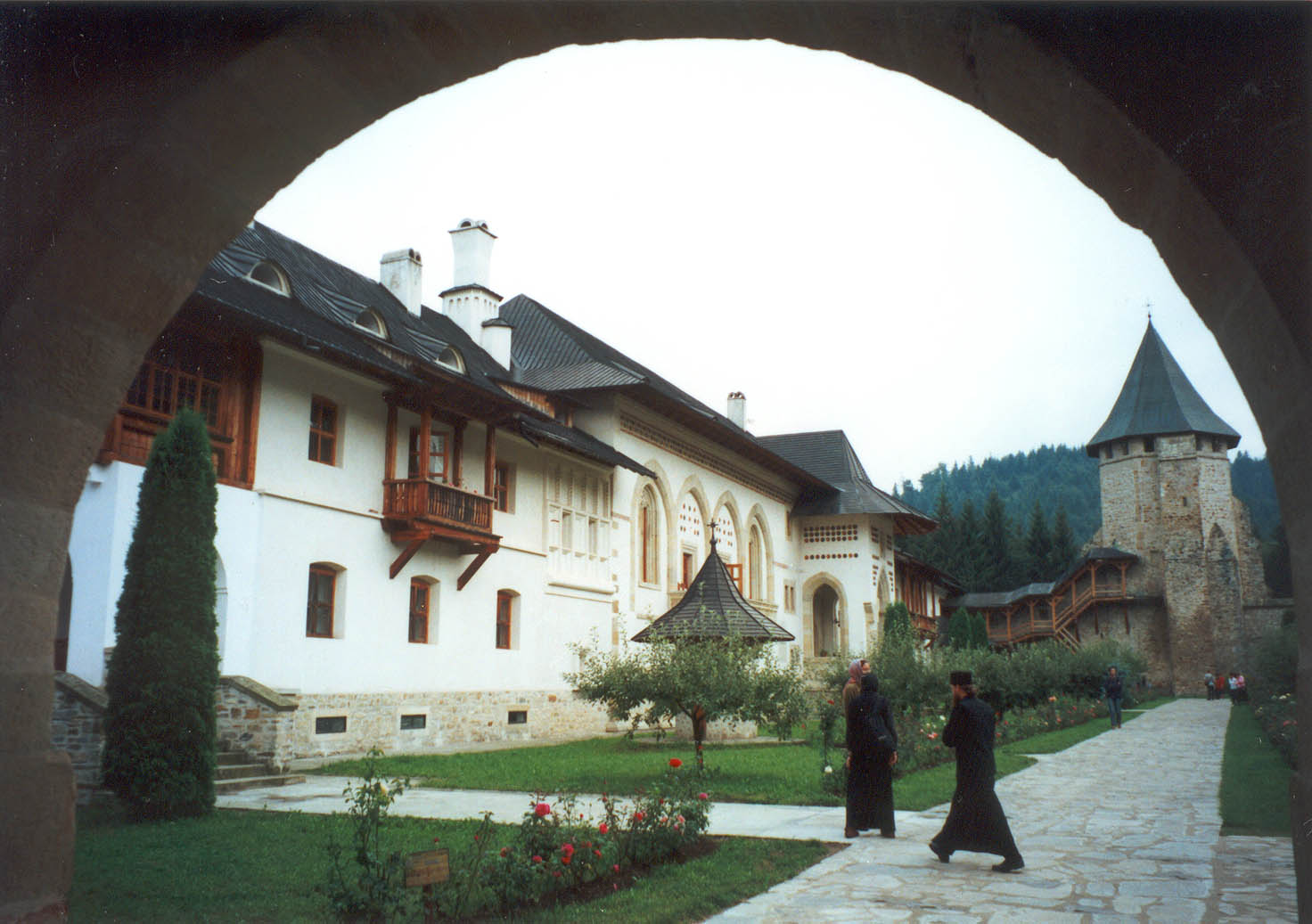
Putna Monastery

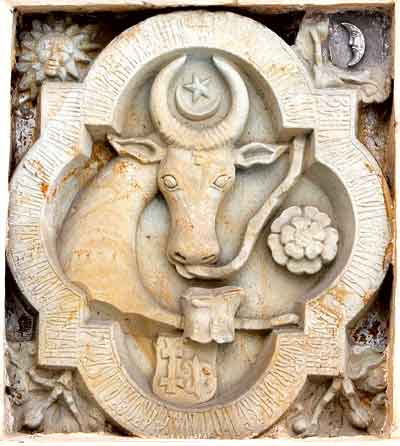

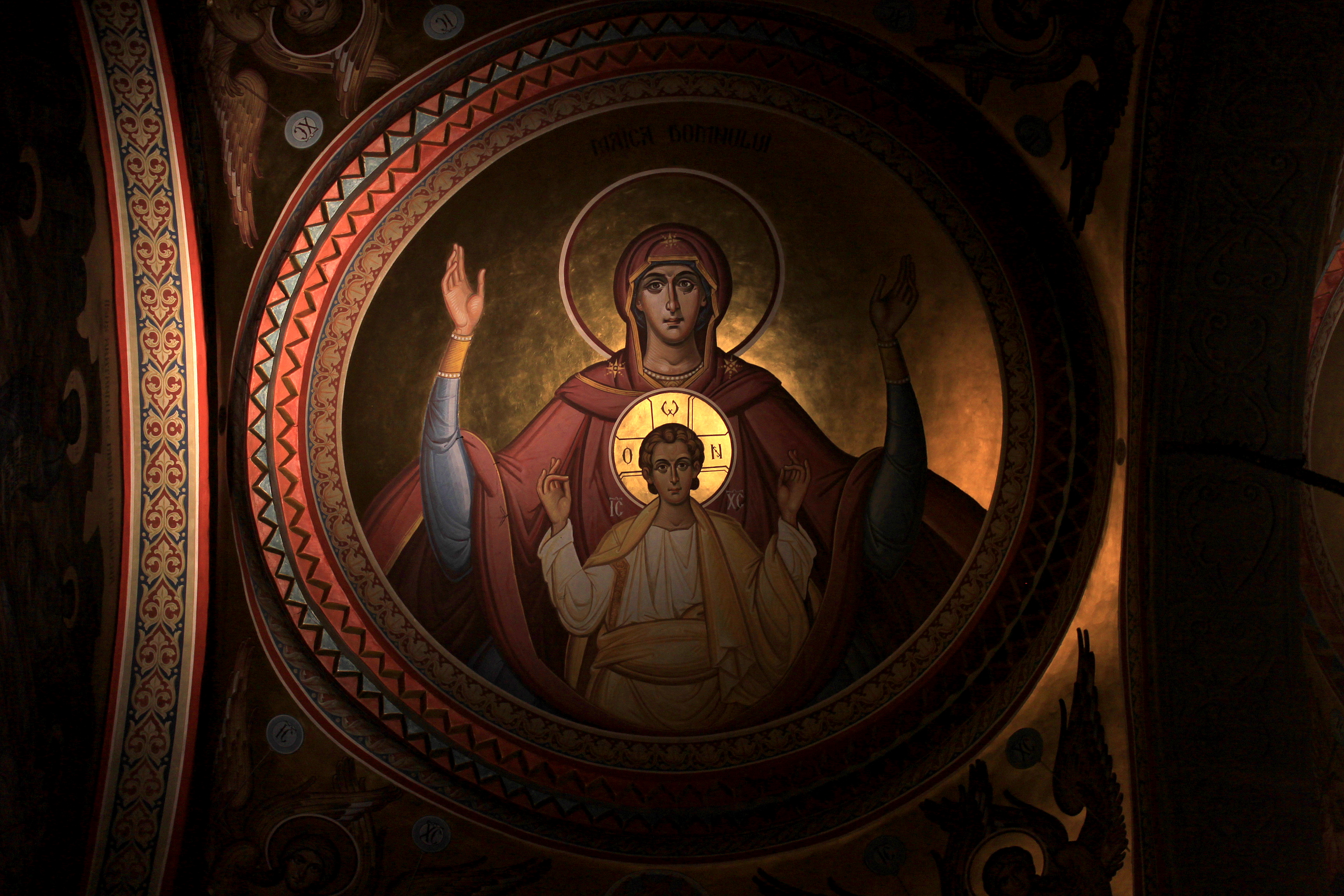

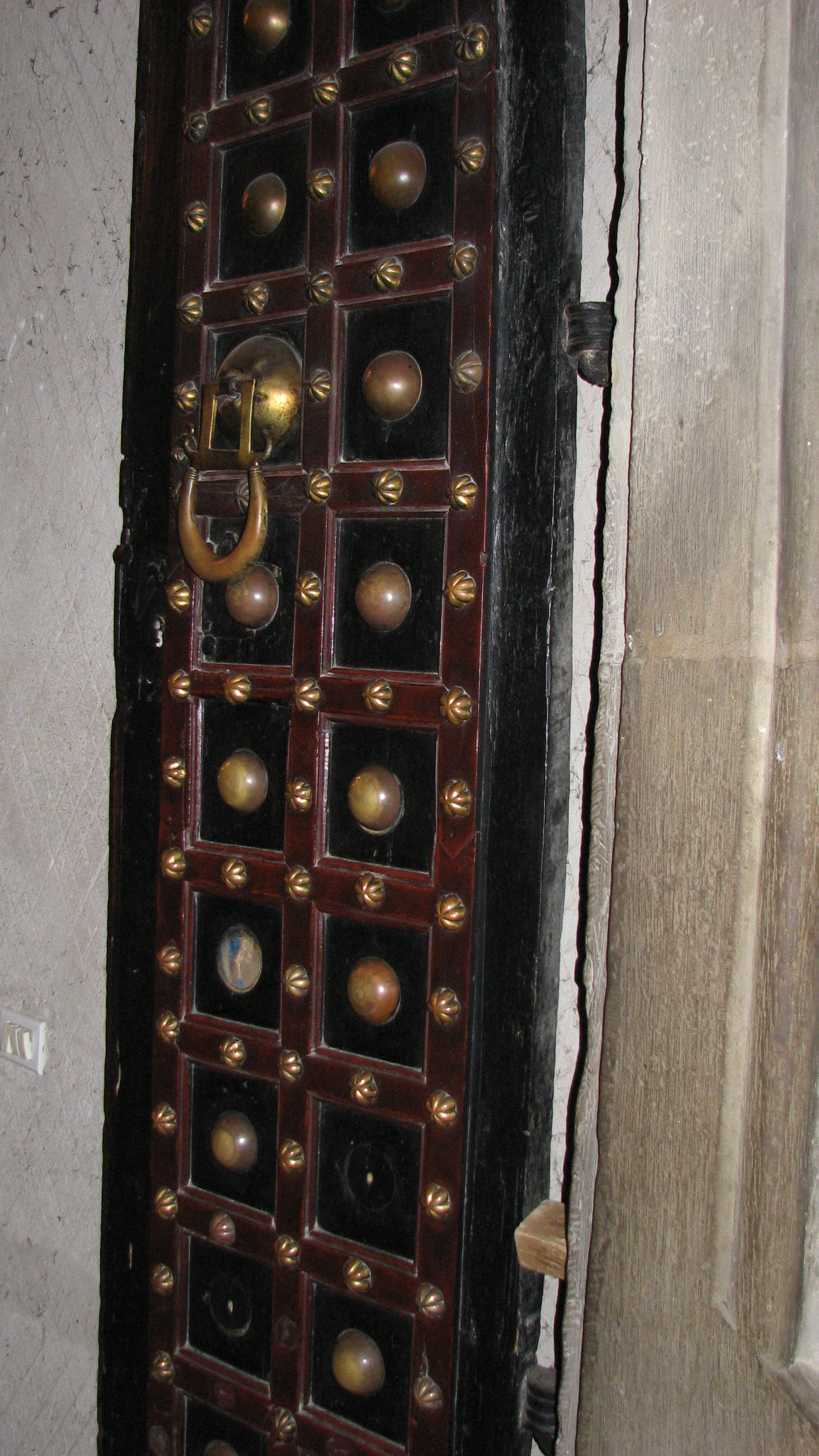

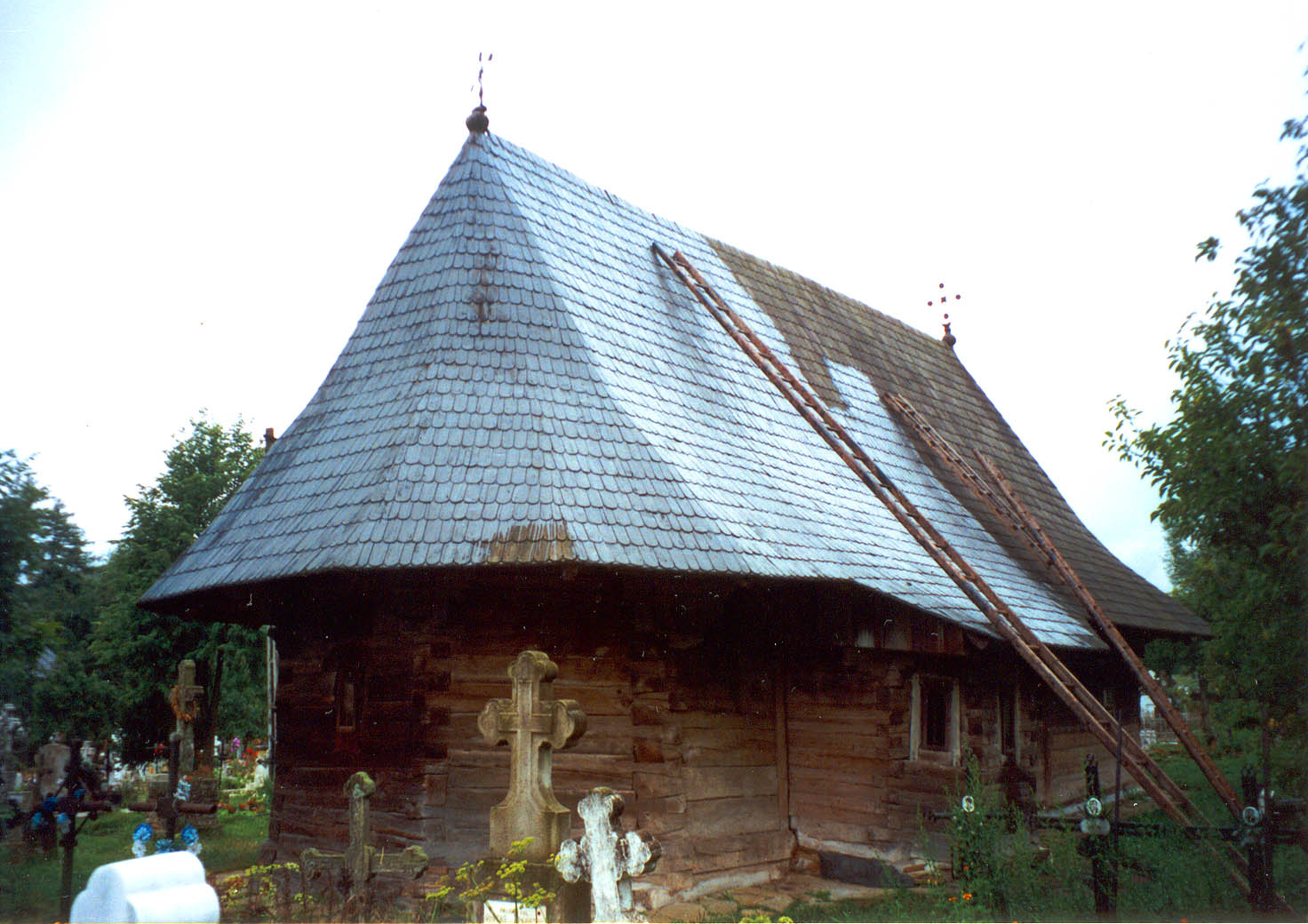
Putna, Old Church
