= Black Army of Hungary =

Professional army of Matthias Corvinus

Black Army
- Standard of the Black legion
- Active: 1458–1494 AD
- Disbanded: 1494 (due to money shortage and mercenary uprising)
- Country: Kingdom of Hungary
- Allegiance: Hungarian, Czech (Bohemian, Moravian, Silesian), Polish, Croatian, Serbian, Moldavian, Wallachian, Bavarian, Austrian, Swiss
- Branch: Army, navy
- Type: Cavalry, infantry, artillery, siege weapons
- Size: approx. 28,000
- Heraldry: This characteristic flag with a forked tail was reconstructed after a miniature in Philostratus Chronicle, one of the Corvinas, representing the 1485 entry of János Corvinus, son of King Matthias, into Vienna. In the Philostratus Chronicle, the apparent black colour of the flag used to be white (argent), but the argent paint oxidized. The reconstruction preserves the original colour.
- Mascot: Raven
- Engagements: Bohemia, Bosnia, Holy Roman Empire, Italy, Moldavia, Ottoman Empire, Poland, Serbia, Wallachia

Commanders
- King: Matthias Corvinus
- Notable commanders: Pál Kinizsi, Balázs Magyar, Emeric Zápolya, John Jiskra, John Haugwitz, František Hag, Vuk Grgurević, Đorđe Branković

The Black Army (Hungarian: Fekete sereg, pronounced [ˈfɛkɛtɛ ˈʃɛrɛɡ], Latin: Legio Nigra), also called the Black Legion/Regiment – were the military forces serving under the reign of King Matthias Corvinus of Hungary. The ancestor and core of this early standing mercenary army appeared in the era of his father John Hunyadi in the early 1440s. The idea of the professional standing mercenary army came from Matthias' juvenile readings about the life of Julius Caesar. The multinational army, drawing on the earlier Hussite battle tactics, helped to pioneer the concept of a standing mercenary army that would soon be adopted across Europe.

Hungary's Black Army traditionally encompasses the years from 1458 to 1494. The men of the Black Army fought as well-paid, full-time mercenaries and were purely devoted to the arts of warfare. It was a standing mercenary army that conquered large parts of Austria (including the capital Vienna in 1485) and more than half of the Crown of Bohemia (Moravia, Silesia and both Lusatias); the other important victory of the army was won against the Ottomans at the Battle of Breadfield in 1479.

Matthias recognized the importance and key role of early firearms in the infantry, which greatly contributed to his victories. Every fourth soldier in the Black Army had an arquebus, which was an unusual ratio at the time. The high price of medieval gunpowder prevented them from raising it any further. Even a decade after the disbandment of the Black Army, by the turn of the 16th century, only around 10% of the soldiers of Western European armies used firearms. The main troops of the army were the infantry, artillery and light and heavy cavalry. The function of the heavy cavalry was to protect the light armoured infantry and artillery, while the other corps delivered sporadic, surprise assaults on the enemy.

In the beginning, the core of the army consisted of 6,000–8,000 mercenaries. In the 1480s, the number was between 15,000 and 20,000, but the figures in the great Viennese military parade reached 28,000 men (20,000 horsemen, 8,000 infantry) in 1485. Thus the Black Army was far larger than the army of Louis XI of France, the only other existing permanent professional European army in the era. The soldiers were mainly Czechs, Germans, Serbs, Poles and, from 1480, Hungarians.

The Black Army was not the only large standing mercenary army of Matthias Corvinus. The border castles of the north, west and east were guarded mostly by the retinues of the local nobility, financed by the nobles' own revenues; however the Ottoman frontier zone of southern Hungary had a large professional standing army which was paid by the king. Unlike the soldiers of the Black Army, these large mercenary garrisons were trained for castle defence. No other contemporary European realm would have been able to maintain two large parallel permanent forces for so long.

The death of Matthias Corvinus meant the end of the Black Army. The noble estate of the parliament succeeded in reducing the tax burden by 70–80 percent, at the expense of the country's ability to defend itself, thus the newly elected king Vladislaus II was unable to cover the cost of the army. King Vladislaus II donated most of the royal estates, régales and royalties to the nobility. After the dissolution of the Black Army, the Hungarian magnates also dismantled the national administration systems and bureaucracy throughout the country. The country's defenses sagged as border guards and castle garrisons went unpaid, fortresses fell into disrepair, and initiatives to increase taxes to reinforce defenses were stifled.

== Etymology ==
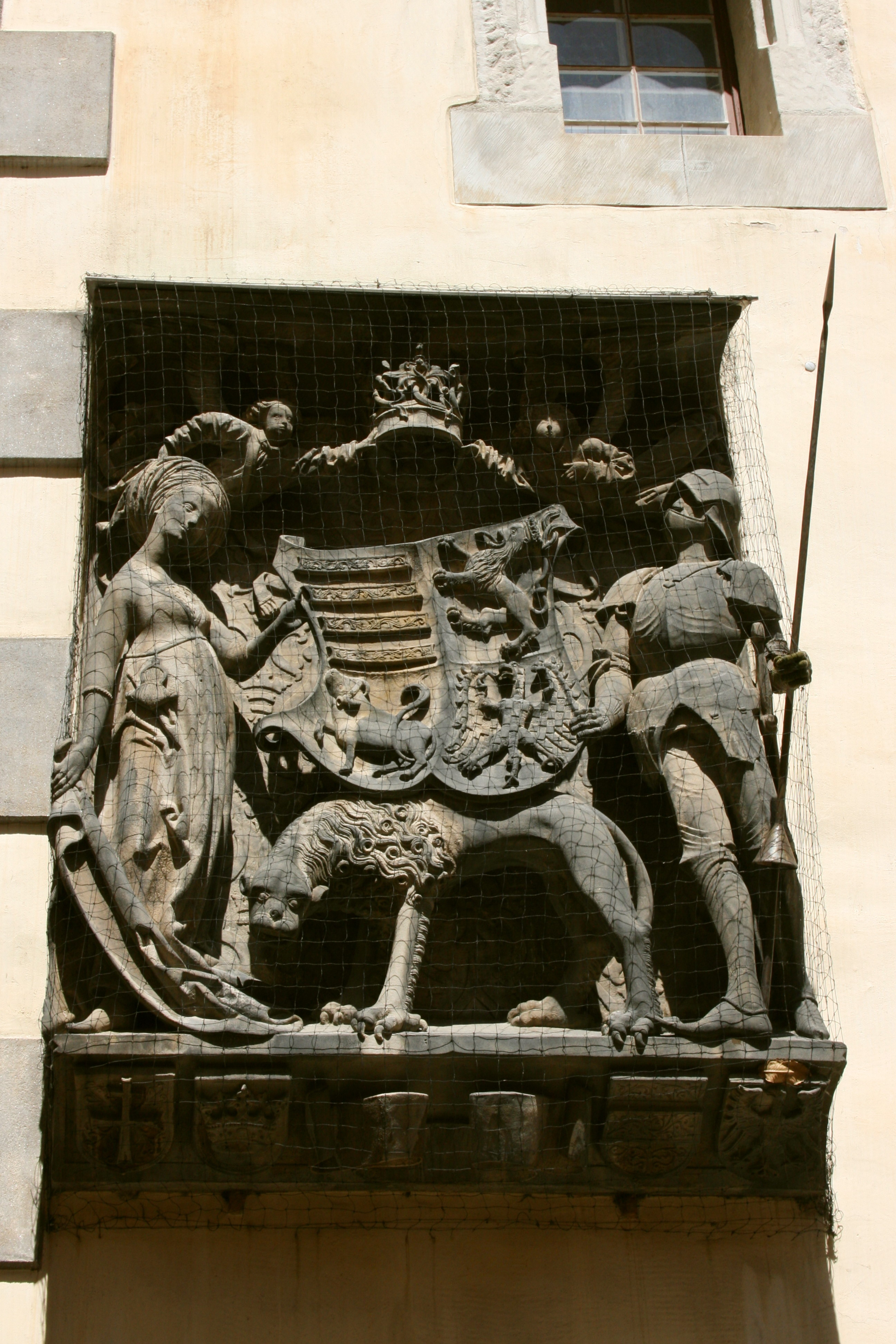
Coat of arms of Corvinus on the old Townhall of Görlitz guarded by a Black Army knight, as a sign that Görlitz belonged to the Hungarian crown under King Matthias (1488)

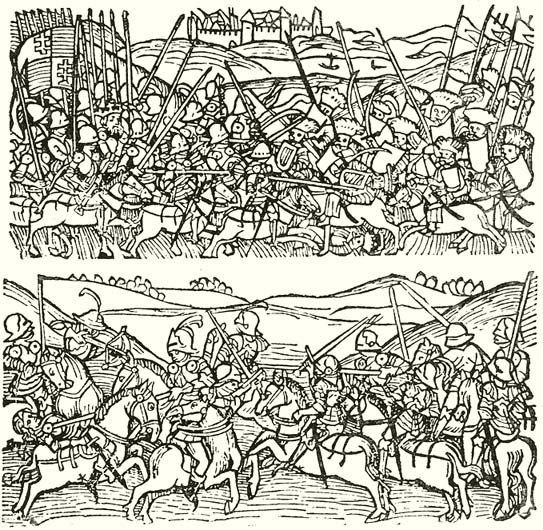
Top: Black Army knights fought with Ottoman cavalry. Bottom: training of knights. Engraving from the Thuróczy chronicle (1488)

Several theories exist about the army's name. The first recorded accounts using "black" description appear in written memoranda immediately after Corvinus' death, when the rest of the army was pillaging Hungarian, and later Austrian, villages when they were receiving no pay. One idea is that they adopted the adjective from a captain, "Black" John Haugwitz, whose nickname already earned him enough recognition to be identified with the army as a whole.

== Reforms of the draft of traditional feudal and levy armies ==
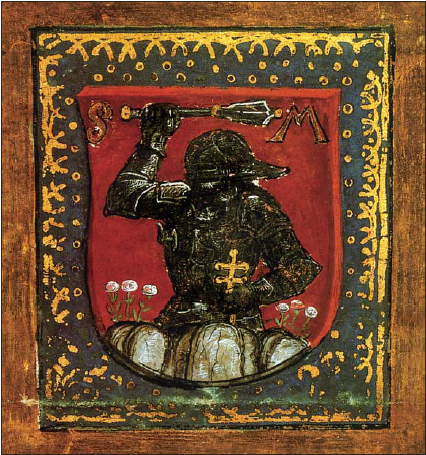
A knight from the Black Army

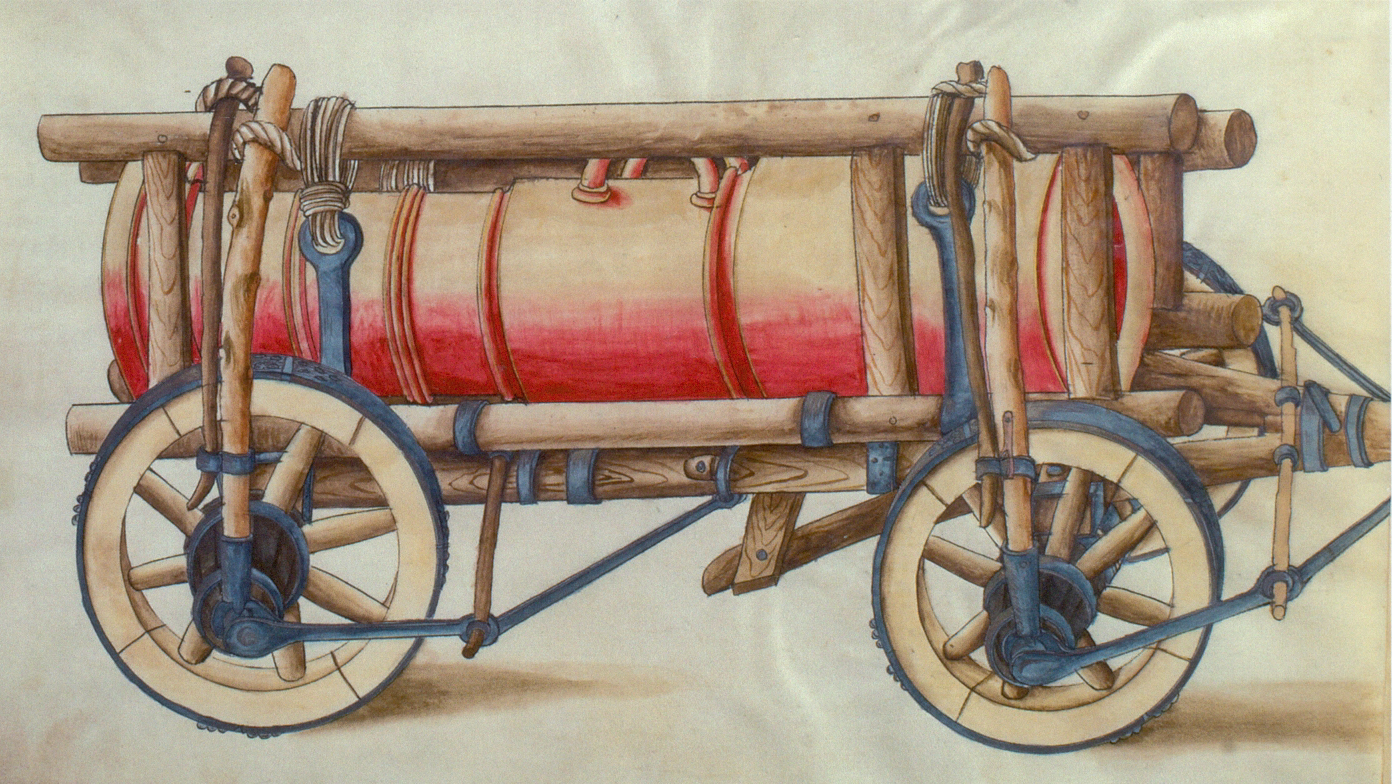
Jörg Kölderer: A big caliber siege cannon from the "Elephant" series of Matthias Corvinus.

In the first years of Matthias' rule, the structure of enlisting troops was built on the legacy of his ancestor Sigismund of Luxembourg. The majority of his army consisted of noble banners and the soldiers provided and regulated by the militia portalis (manor militia), which outlined that for every twenty serf-lots (portae, literally "gates"), a noble was ordered to raise and lend one archer to the king. Later, that obligation was reconsidered, and the limit was shifted to one archer per 33 manors and three mounted archers per 100 manors. Those who did not have serfs but owned manors as a noble had to join a regional count in state of war. No significant number of mercenaries were present in the Hungarian Army during Matthias' early years. (In the 1463 Janus Pannonius' report of the siege of Jajce Castle, there is no mention of them.)

In case of emergency, a last chance existed for the actual king in power to mobilize the population suddenly. Every noble, no matter his social class, had to participate in person with his weaponry and all of his personal guards made available. These were the estate armies. Whenever they were called upon, they were not allowed to fight for longer than 15 days, and their field of operations was restricted to within the borders of Hungary. The so-called insurrectio (noble "insurrection") was nothing more than an obsolete form of drafting, but it was valid until the Battle of Raab in 1809, mainly because it relieved the participating nobles of paying their taxes; but generally, these enlisted armada played a minor role in the Black Army, since Matthias decreased their participation gradually and called them up in large numbers early in his reign.

In the laws of 1459 of Szeged, he restored the basis of 20 serfs to induct an archer (this time it was based on the number of persons). The barons' militia portalis no longer counted in the local noble's banner but into the army of the country (led by a captain appointed by the king) and could have been sent abroad as well. He also increased the insurrectio's time of service from 15 days to three months.

== From mercenaries to regularly paid soldiers ==
Though these efforts were sound, the way they were carried out was not in any way supervised. In 1458, Matthias borrowed as many as 500 heavy cavalry from the Bohemian king, George of Poděbrady, to strengthen his situation at home against his rival landlords. This marks the turning point away from obsolete noble banners to skilled soldiers of fortune (in this case, they were remnants of the Hussites, whose battle tactics were later adapted by the Black Army). He needed more seasoned veterans, so he chose to settle a group of rogue Czech Army deserters led by John Jiskra who were already plundering the northern countryside seeking daily loot. Jiskra was promised a royal pardon and two castles, Solymos and Lippa (now Şoimuş and Lipova), in the Peace Treaty of Wiener Neustadt of 1463, and his soldiers received a payment of 25,000 ducats. He was stationed in Bosnia to fight the Ottomans the next year. Previously, in 1462, the King sent word to his equerry that he should hire 8,000 cavalry to start a holy war against the Ottoman Empire only if the Venetians – according to their promise – covered the expenses (unfortunately for the Hungarians, this financial aid was postponed from time to time). The first major and mass conscription of mercenaries appeared during the Bohemian Wars (1468–1478), whereas the core of his royal infantry, a force of 6,000–8,000 armed men, were incorporated into the Black Army (the origins of the moniker could also come from this era).

=== Funding ===
After Matthias's income increased periodically, simultaneously, the number of mercenaries increased as well. Historical records vary when it comes to numbers, mainly because it changed from battle to battle and most soldiers were only employed for the duration of combat or a longer conflict. Reckoning the nobility's banners, the mercenaries, the soldiers of conquered Moravia and Silesia, and the troops of allied Moldavia and Wallachia, the King could have gathered an army of 90,000 men. The nobility's participation in the battlefield was ignored by the time their support could have been redeemed in gold later on. The cities were also relieved of paying war levies if they supplied the craftsmanship and weapon production to equip the military.

King Matthias increased the serfs' taxes; he switched the basis of taxing from the portae to the households, and occasionally, they collected the royal dues twice a year during wartime. Counting the vassals' tribute, the western contributions, the local nobility's war payment, the tithes, and the urban taxes, Matthias's annual income reached 650,000 florins; for comparison, the Ottoman Empire had 1,800,000 per year. In contrast to popular belief, historians have speculated for decades that the actual sum altogether could circle around 800,000 florins in a good year at the peak of Matthias's reign, but never surpassed the financial threshold of one million florins, a previously commonly accepted number. In 1467, Matthias Corvinus reformed the coin system for easier accumulation of taxes and manageable disbursements and introduced an improved dinar, which had a finer silver content (500‰) and weighed half a gram. He also re-established its ratio, where one florin of gold equaled 100 dinars of silver, which was so stable that it remained in place until the mid-16th century.

The army was divided into three parts: the cavalry, paid three florins per horse; the pavisors, who received double the money; and the archers, light infantry and arquebusiers, with the latter consisting of mostly Czechs, Germans and Poles (all paid differently). Medieval gunpowder was quite expensive, so the King preferred adapting Hussite tactics to mounted warfare (based on defense, placing infantry behind wagon blockades or tall pavises, while the cavalry constantly harassed the enemy and guarded the "middle") and preferred archery to fusiliers, with the latter being engaged at the very start of the battle. With firearm production being made available by local marksmen in Transylvania, especially in Braşov, this type of ranged infantry became cheaper to handle for the Hungarians.

=== Improving the river fleet ===
The river fleet (Hungarian: flottila or naszád) was composed of wooden galleys, rowboats (later upgraded to gunboats), and smaller ships, which were capable of sailing up the rivers Danube, Tisza and Sava. The victory at the Belgrade (Nándorfehérvár) in 1456, where the fleet played a significant role in breaking through the Turkish river blockade to bring relief to the besieged city, showed its importance and signaled the beginning of a recognition of its significance. It also encouraged King Matthias to build a larger and better-equipped navy. Since they were manned by South Slavs, mainly Serbs and Croats, the two major ports of operations were Belgrade and Szabács (Šabac). In 1475, concomitantly with the introduction of field guns, he ordered the installation of artillery onto the river barges as well as bombards able to shoot cannonballs ranging from 100 to 200 pounds (45 to 91 kg). In 1479, he had a mixed fleet of 360 vessels, a crew of 2600 sailors, and a capacity of 10,000 soldiers on board. Matthias also secured an exit to the Adriatic Sea: the city-port of Zengg from which Matthias Balázs could embark for his maritime campaigns. King Matthias could also monitor the trade going through the Danube Delta to the Black Sea from the city of Kilia, but during his reign, it was seized by the Moldavian army supported by the Ottoman fleet.

== Branches, tactics, equipment ==
=== Tactics ===
... we regard the armored heavy infantry as a wall, who never give up their place, even if they are slaughtered to the last one of them, on the very spot they are standing. Light soldiers perform breakouts depending on the occasion, and when they are already tired or sense severe danger, they return behind the armoured soldiers, organizing their lines and collecting power, and stay there until, on occasion, they may break forth again. In the end, all of the infantry and shooters are surrounded by armoured and shielded soldiers, just as those were standing behind a rampart. Since, the greater pavieses, put next to each other in a circle, show the picture of a fortress, and are similar to a wall, in the protection whereof the infantry and all the ones standing in the middle, fight like from behind tower-walls or rampart, and they occasionally break out of there.

— Matthias Corvinus, in a letter to his father-in-law King Ferdinand I of Naples in the 1480s.

=== Heavy cavalry ===
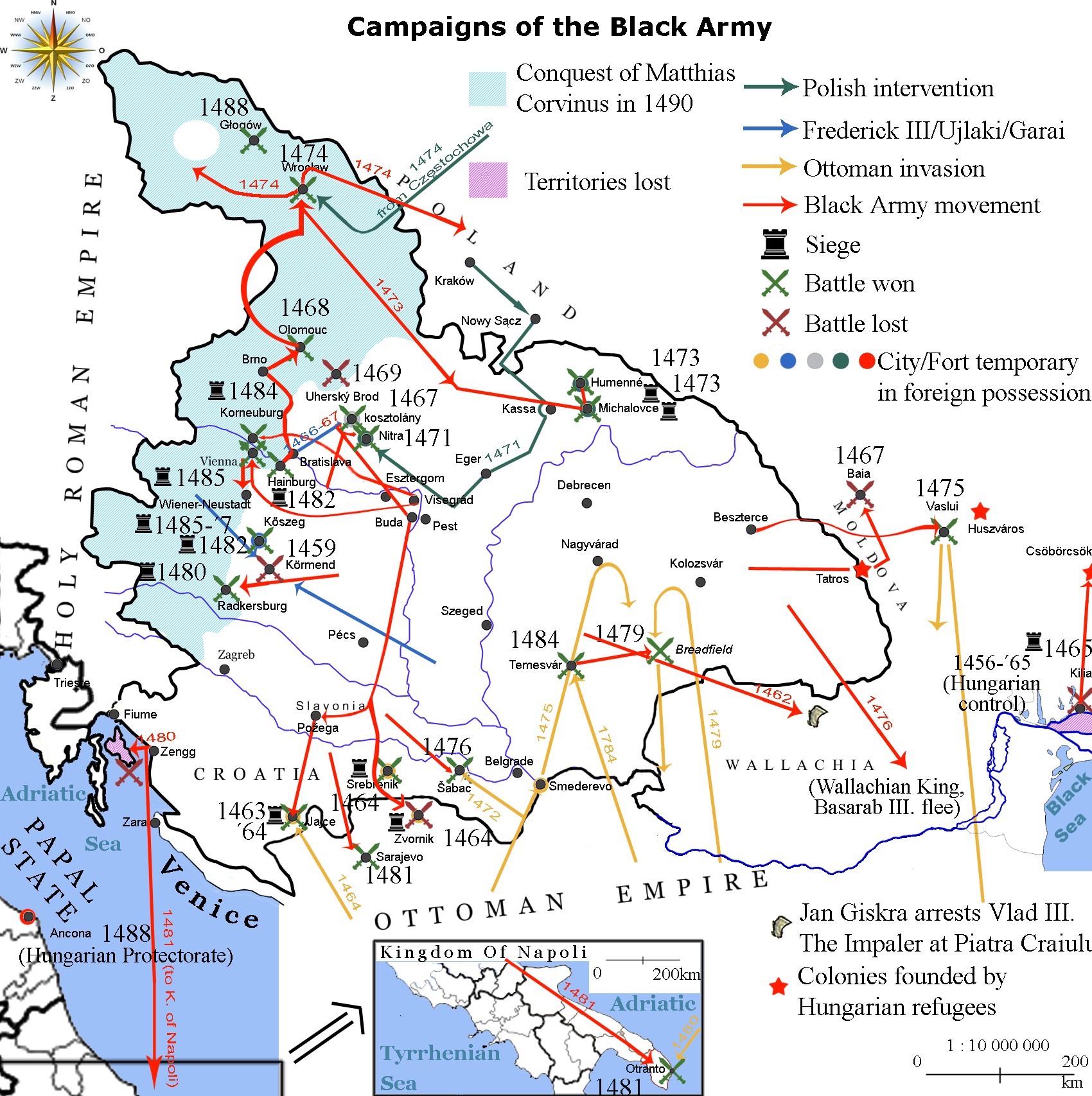
Military movements of Matthias Corvinus and the Black Army

At the height of the century, heavy cavalry was already at its peak, although it showed signs of declining tendencies. The striking power and the ability to charge without backup made it capable of forcing a decisive outcome in most battles. Although it was rarely deployed on their own, if it was, it would take square formations. Such turning points occurred at the Battle of Breadfield (1479). Usually, it made up one-sixth of the army and, with mercenary knights, was in the majority. Its armament was well prepared and of high quality except for the noble banners. This stands for proprietary arms, not the ones provided by the king.

==== Weaponry ====
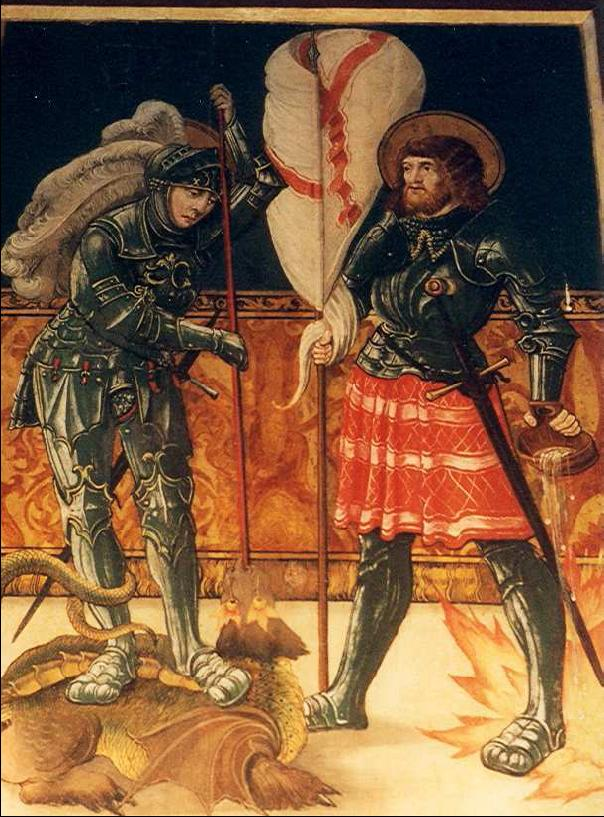
Saint George and Saint Florian, depicted in the armour suits of Black Army knights. Fresco of the Roman Catholic church of Pónik (now Póniky, Slovakia), 1478

- Lances: the lance was the principal assault weapon of the tilting heavy cavalry. They were up to four metres long, ranging from the classical lance type with a lengthened spearhead (often decorated with animal tails, flags or other ornaments) to the short conical spearheaded, one designed for piercing heavy armour. A buckler-like vamplate protected the hand and arm. Its stability was increased with a fastening hook (lance-arret) on the side of the horseman's cuirass.
- Swords: the most common swords of the era originated from southern Europe. They were one metre long, designed to cut rather than thrust, with an S-shaped crossguard. As in many medieval swords, the heavy pommel balanced the blade and could be used for striking in close combat. The other version, which became popular in the second half of the century, was of similar design except for the quillon, which was curved towards the blade for the purpose of breaking or clinching the enemy's blade. The 130–140 cm long bastard swords also came into use. As a companion weapon, daggers of saw-toothed and flame-form type were applied (both with ring-guard) and a misericordia.
- Apart from these, they carried auxiliary weapons, such as Gothic maces, flanged maces, axes, crossbows (balistrero ad cavallo) and short shields similar in design to the pavise (petit pavois) for defense.

=== Light cavalry ===
The traditional hussars were introduced by Matthias; henceforth, the light cavalry is called huszár, a name derived from the word húsz ("twenty" in English), which refers to the drafting scheme where for every twenty serfs a noble owned, he had to equip a mounted soldier. After the Diet of Temesvár (Timişoara) of 1397, the light cavalry was institutionalized as an army division. According to Antonio Bonfini, this lightly armed cavalry (expeditissimus equitatus) was not allowed to be part of the regular army when the order of the battle was formed, but was placed outside it in quite separate groups and used to destroy, burn, kill and instil fear in the civilian population, while they rode ahead of the regular army. They assembled from the militia portalis, a significant number of them insurrectios, the Moldavians and Transylvanians with the first having serfs with lesser accoutrement and the latter generally regarded as good horse archers. They were divided into groups of 25 (turma) led by a captain (capitaneus gentium levis armature). Their field of operation was scouting, securing, prowling, cutting enemy supply lines, and disarraying them in battle. They also served as an additional maneuverable flank (for swooping advance attacks) to strong centers of heavy cavalry. The medieval Hungarian written sources spoke disparagingly and contemptuously of the light cavalry and the hussars in general, and during battles the texts praised only the virtues, endurance, courage, training and achievements of the knights. During the Middle Ages, Hungarian soldiers of noble origin served exclusively as heavy armoured cavalry.

==== Weaponry ====
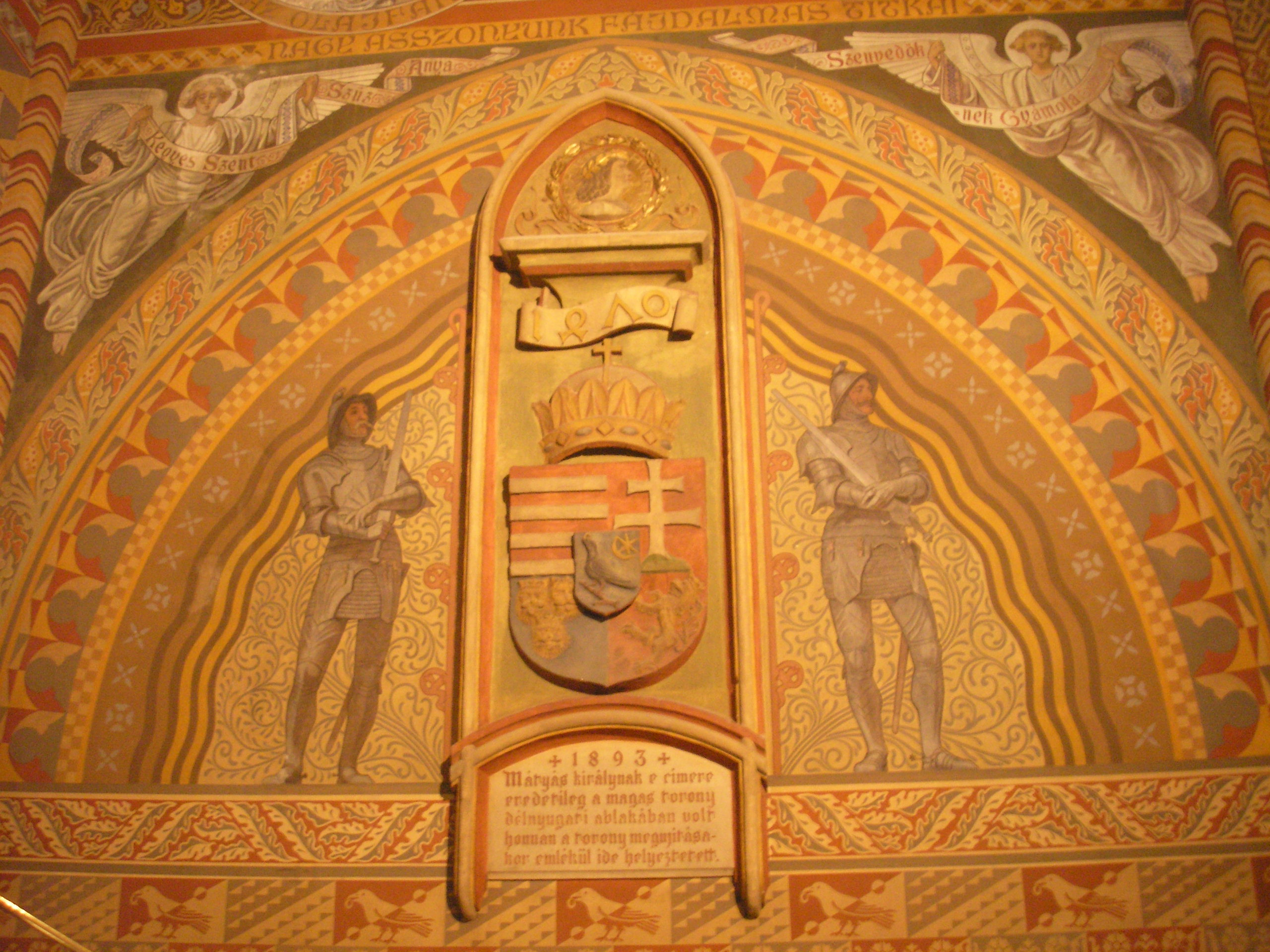
Medieval coat of arms of Matthias Corvinus, guarded by Black Army heavy infantry officers. Matthias Church, Budapest. The damaged art relic was renovated in 1893.

Helmet, mail shirt, sabre, targe, spear and, in some cases, axes (including throwing axes).

- Sabres (szablya): one type followed the tradition of southern European longswords (S-shaped crossguard), while gradually transforming into an Eastern-style blended (Turkish) sabre. The other type was the so-called huszarszablya (hussarsabre), a 40 mm wide multi-layered sabre stuck with 3–6 rivets.
- Bows: the traditional Magyar composite bow and, due to heavy Eastern influence, the more powerful Turkish-Tatar bow came into play.
- Axes: throwing axes could also have had some role in light cavalry tactics. It was made from one piece of metal, with a short engraved haft. If the arc of the blade is almost flat or slightly curved, it is called the "Hungarian-type axe". A subsidiary to the aforementioned beaked pickaxe was also favoured: it had a beak-like, protruding edge, resulting in a stronger piercing effect.

=== Infantry ===
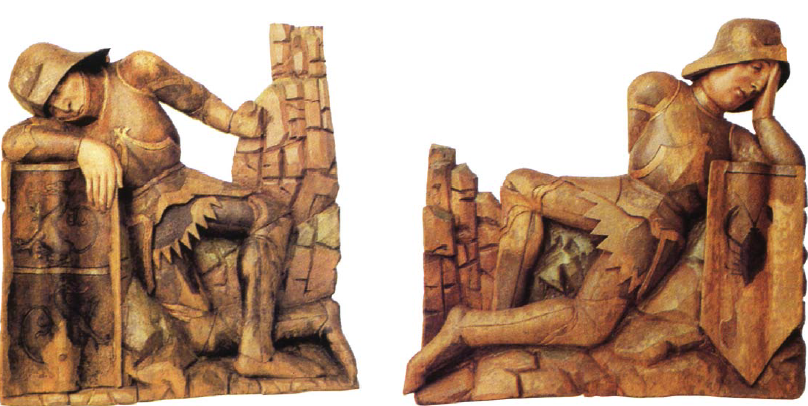
The ancient "Roman guards" of the tomb of Jesus Christ were depicted as contemporary infantrymen of the Kingdom of Hungary. Church of Hronský Beňadik (built around the 1470s, then called Garamszentbenedek).

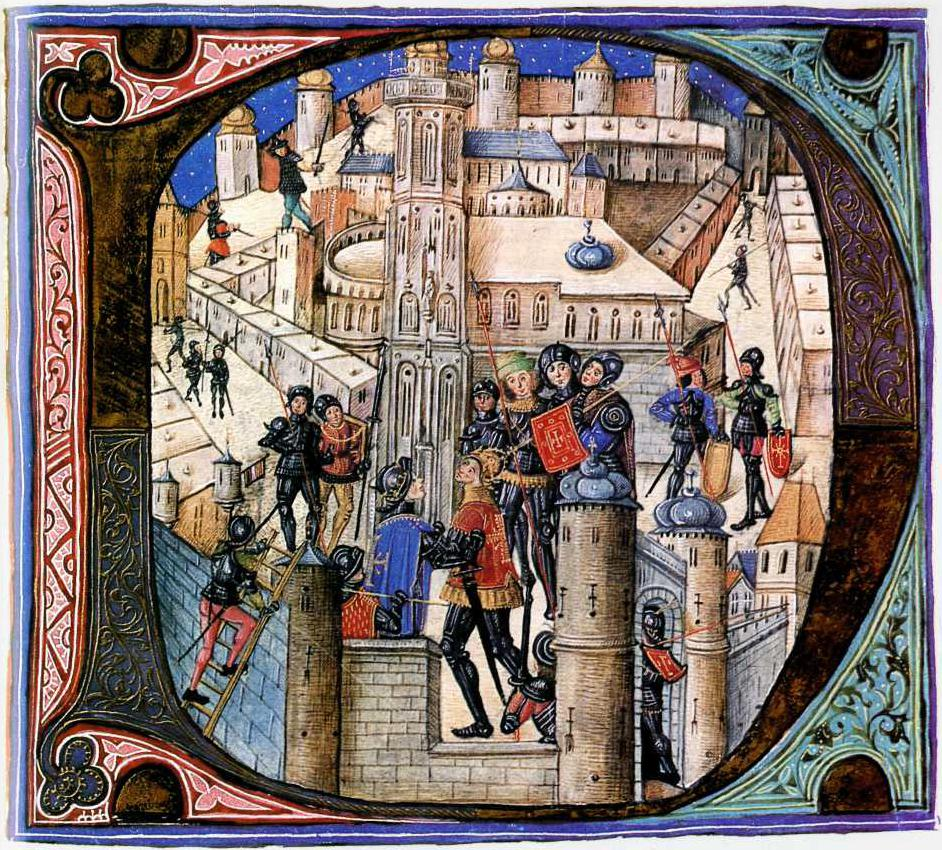
Black Army infantry in a castle 1480s.

Infantry was less important but formed a stable basis in the integrity of an army. They were organized from mixed ethnicities and were composed of heavy infantry, shielded soldiers, light infantry and fusiliers. Their characteristics include the combination of plate and mail armour and the use of the pavises (these painted willow-wood large shields were often ornamented and covered with leather and linen). The latter served multiple purposes: to hold off enemy attacks, to cover ranged infantry shooting from behind (fusiliers engage first, the archers fire constantly), and moveable hussite-style tabor (with a restricted deployment of war wagons in number). The infantry contained Swiss pikemen, who were held in high regard by the king. The heavily armoured infantry of the Black Army consisted of heavy pikemen, heavy halberdiers and heavy swordsmen.

In 1481, the Black Army's infantry was described as follows:

The third form of the army is the infantry, which divides into various orders: the common infantry, the armoured infantry, and the shield bearers. ... The armored infantry and shield bearers cannot carry their armor and shields without pages and servants, and since it is necessary to provide them with pages, each of them requires one page per armor and shield and double bounty. Then there are the handgunners ... These are very practical, set behind the shield-bearers at the start of the battle, before the armies engage, and in defense. Nearly all of the infantry and arbusiers are surrounded by armored soldiers and shield-bearers, as if they were standing behind a bastion. The large shields set together in a circle present the appearance of a fort and similar to a wall in whose defense the infantry and all those among them fight almost as if from behind bastion walls or ramparts and at the given moment break out from it.

— Matthias Corvinus's letter to Gabriele Rangoni, Bishop of Eger

==== Weaponry ====
Various long-range weapons including bows, crossbows, and arquebuses; all sorts of melee weapons, halberds, pikes, and awl-pikes; hussite/peasant weapons such as slings and flails; hand weapons such as morning stars and war hammers; and classical swords and sabres.

- Melee weapons: Corseques, glaives, partisans, Friulian spears, and halberds were all adapted depending on the social class and nationality of the infantrymen. The 15th-century type of halberd was a transition that mixed an axe blade with an awl-pike, sometimes affixed with a "beak" that was used to pull a knight off his horse and to increase its piercing impact. They were covered with metal langlets on the side to prevent being cut in two.
- Archery: The most valuable archers were the crossbowmen. Their number in Matthias' service reached 4,000 in the 1470s. They used sabres as a secondary weapon (which was unusual for infantry in those ages). Their primary advantage was the ability to shoot heavy armour, while the disadvantages were that they required defense to protect them while moving slowly in a standing position.
- Arquebusiers: These gunpowder troops charged in the early stages of battle. Their aiming ability, price and the danger of primitive hand cannons (self-exploding) prevented them from being highly effective, especially against smaller groups of people or hand-to-hand combat. A distinctive Hungarian feature was that they did not use a fork to stabilize their guns but put it on top of the pavese instead (or in some cases, on the parapet of a wagon). Two types were simultaneously brought to practice, the schioppi (handgun) in the beginning, and later the arquebus à croc (not to be confused with cannons). Three classes of handguns were distinguished: the "bearded" light guns; forked guns; the first primitive muskets (iron tube compounded with wooden grip to be pushed against the shoulder). Their calibers varied from 16 to 24 mm.
Arsenal

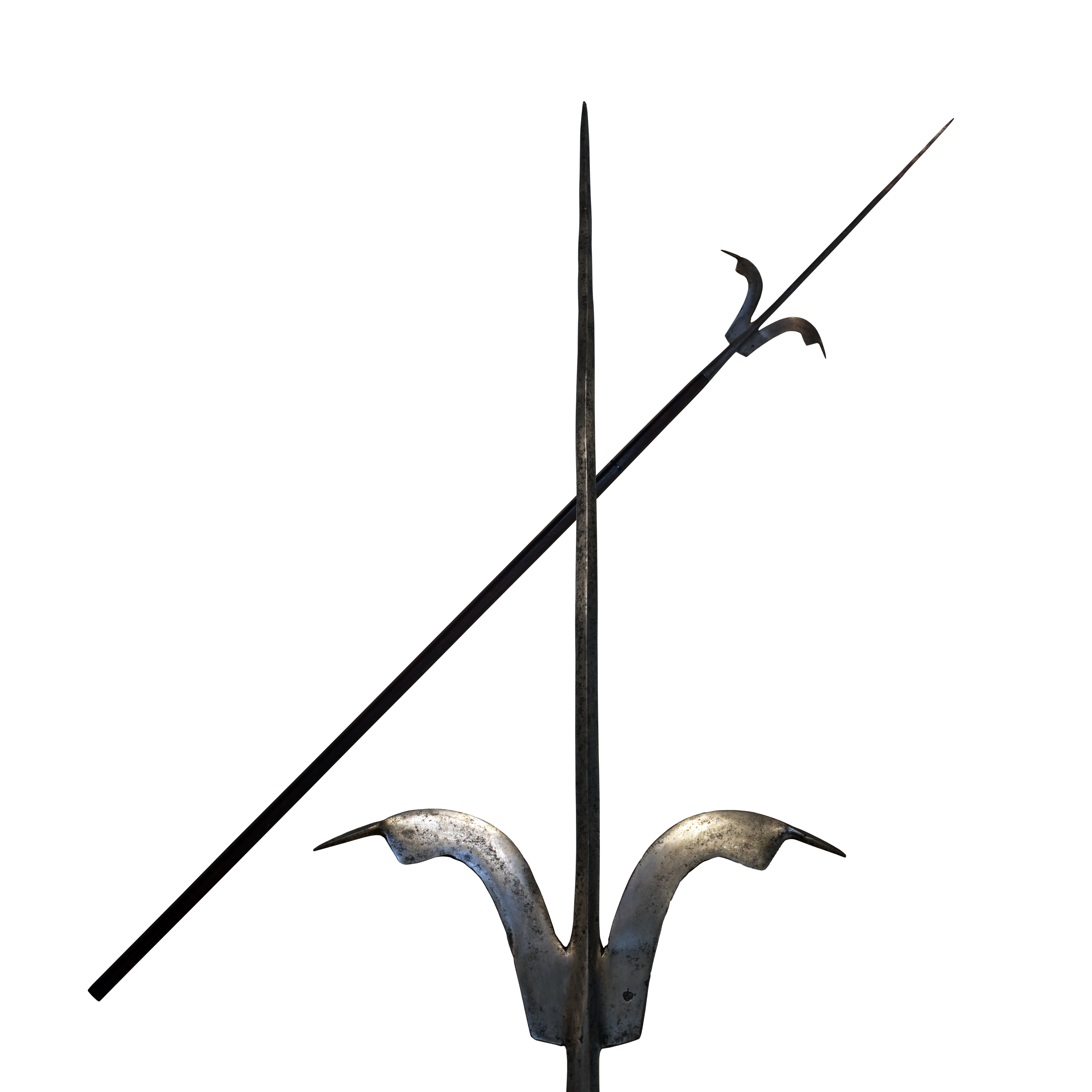
Corseque

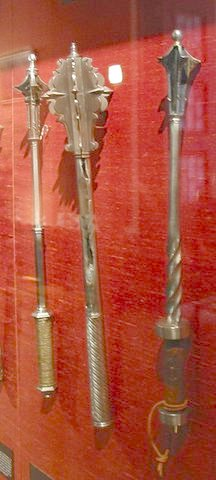
Flanged maces

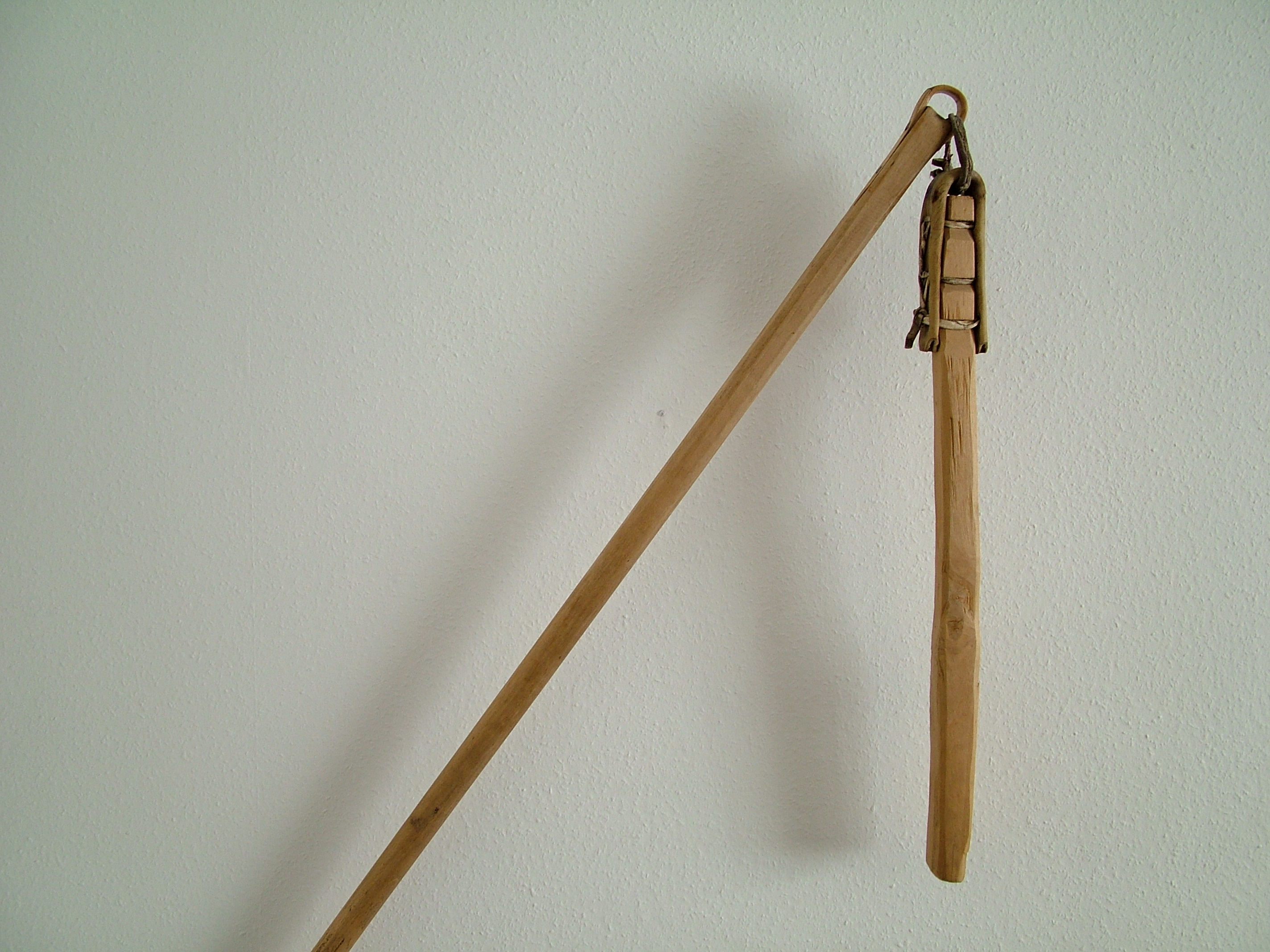
Peasant flail

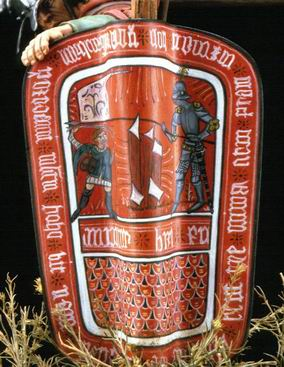
Pavise shield

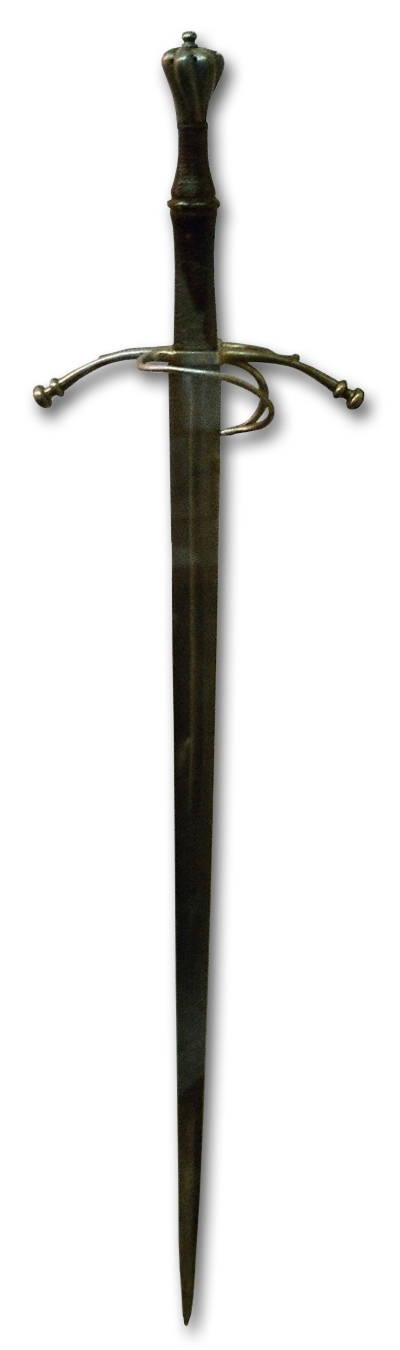
Bastard sword

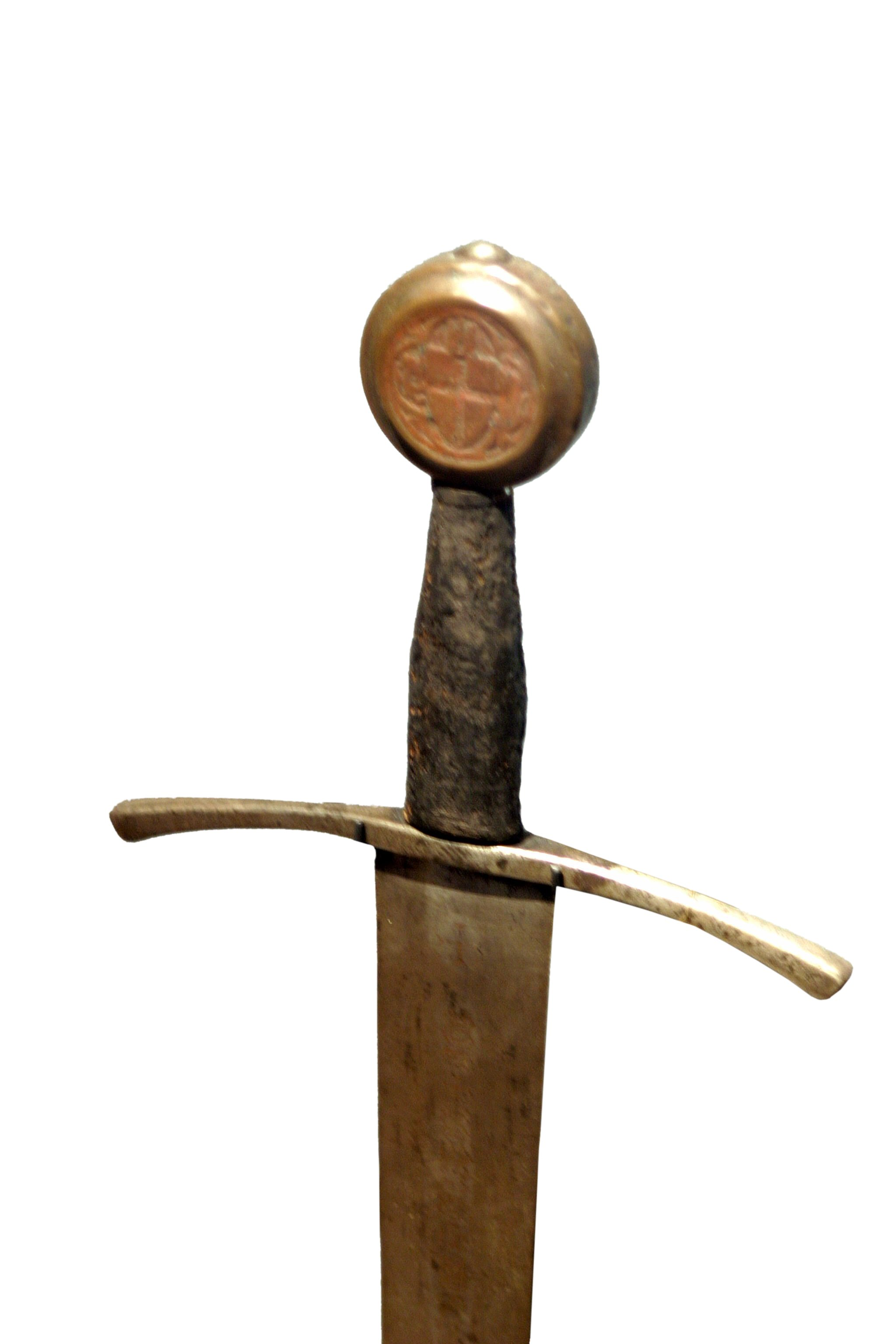
Blended crossguarded sword

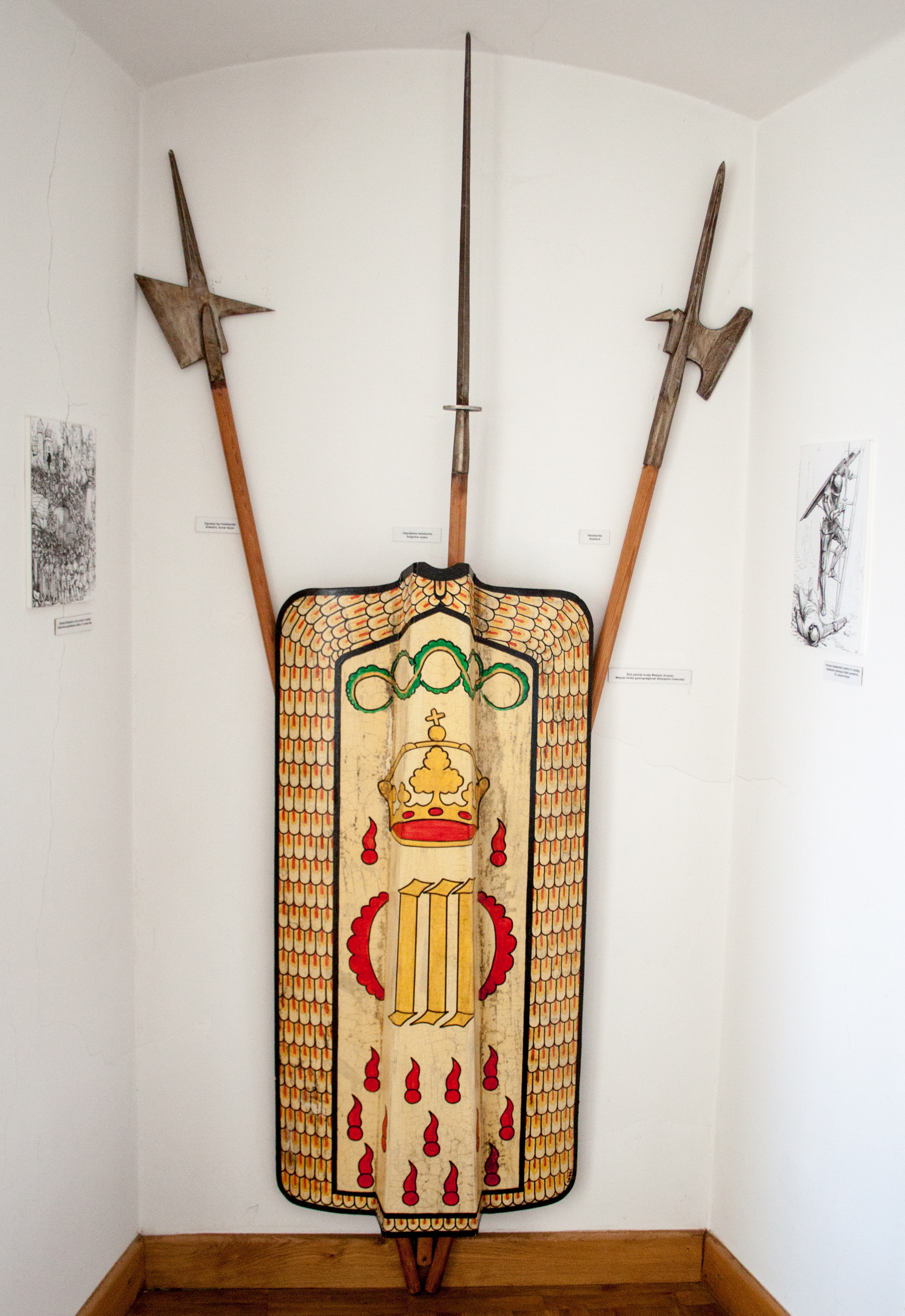
Pavise and halberds

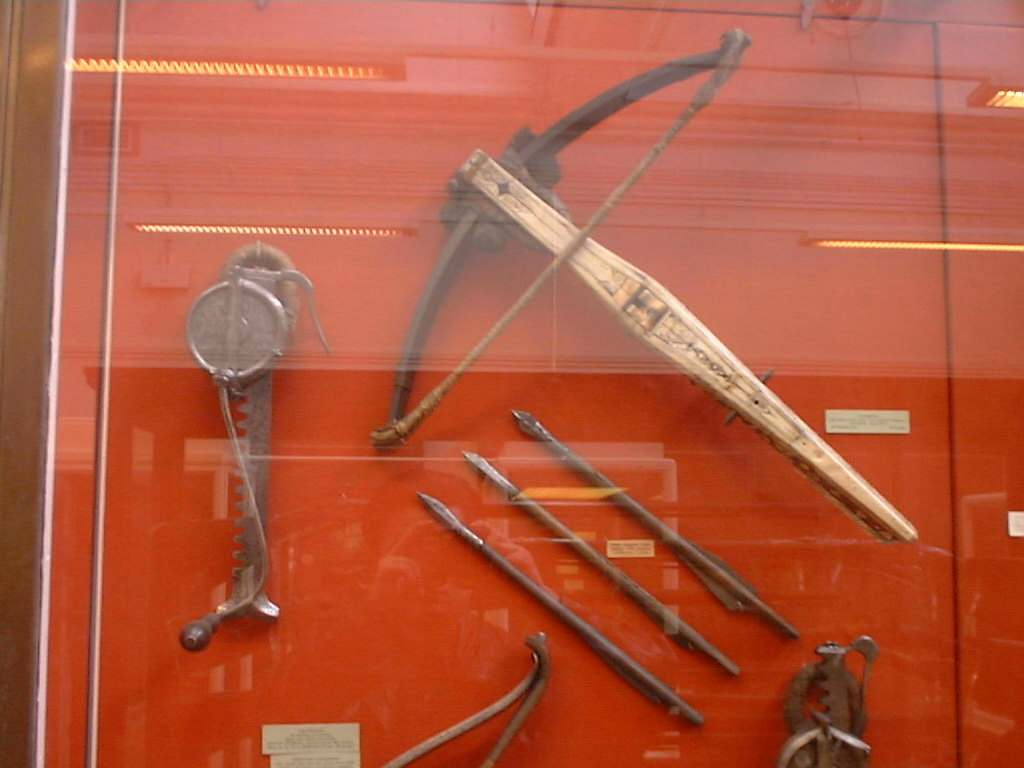
Crossbow and accessories

== Mutinies ==
The disadvantage of having periodically or occasionally paid recruits was that if their money had not arrived on time, they simply left the battlefield, or – in a worse scenario – they revolted, as happened in several instances. Since they were the same skilled men-at-arms led by the same leaders previously fighting under the Hungarian flag, they were as difficult to eliminate as the Black Army was to its enemies. However, they could be outnumbered, since it was always a flank or division which quit the campaign. An easier solution was to have the captain accept some lands and castles to be mortgaged in return of service (in one occasion the forts of Ricsó (Hričovský hrad) and Nagybiccse (Bytča) to František Hag). An example of mass desertion occurred in 1481 when a group of 300 horsemen joined the opposing Holy Roman forces. One of these recorded insurrections was conducted by Jan Švehla, who accompanied Corvinus to Slavonia in 1465 to beat the Ottomans; but when they were approaching Zagreb, Švehla asked for royal permission to officially quit the offensive with his mercenaries due to financial difficulty. His request was denied, and as a consequence, he and two of his vice-captains left the royal banner along with their regiments.

Following their breakaway, George of Poděbrady secretly supported their invasion into the Comitatus of Nitra and their occupation of the fort of Kosztolány, as the army was composed of Bohemian-Moravian professionals previously in service for George and Frederick III. Apart from the militia, there were religious outcasts (considered heretics) looking for shelter, including Hussite Bratriks ("Brothers" – Hussites in Slovakia/Upper Hungary) and rogue Žebraks (Note: Žebrák (Hungarian: Zsebrák) is a distinctive historical and military term deriving from the same Czech word meaning beggar. It refers to Czech booty-hunters ravaging the northern regions of Hungary in the 15th century (but would submit themselves to any service for proper pay).) who favoured pillaging instead of payment. Svehla established an ad hoc fort, and he appointed Jorig Lichtenburger and Vöttau as comeses for the county. The fort and its looting inhabitants had a surrounding sphere of influence ranging from the valleys of Váh and Nitra to the eastern provinces of Austria. Matthias realized the threat and ordered two of his "upper-land" captains to besiege Kosztolany, namely Stephen Zápolya and Ladislaus Podmaniczky. After returning from Slavonia, the king joined the siege. It is worth mentioning that here, among few occasions, Matthias cooperated with Frederick. He sent a strong-armoured mounted troop led by commander Ulrich von Grafeneck to help wipe out these brigades. When he reached Pozsony (Bratislava), he was reinforced by knight Georg Pottendorfer with his 600 crusader cavalry. This totaled 8,000–10,000 men ready to besiege, who began an assault after taking some minor fortifications on 1 January 1467. The vanguards of the Black Army officers were all present against their former ally. They included the Palatine Michael Ország, Jan Jiskra, Jan Haugwitz, Balázs Magyar, Pál Kinizsi, Nicholaus Ujlaki Ban of Macsó (Mačva), and Peter Sobi Ban of Bosnia-Croatia-Dalmatia, with the last dying in the assault. Before the siege began, Matthias offered Švehla the chance to return to his service in exchange for an unconditional surrender on all grounds. After a refusal, he immediately began the siege and the cannon firing despite the harsh winter conditions. Švehla and his 2,500 men (and additional citizens) resisted the superior besiegers, but food storages reached extremely low levels and all the efforts to break out were unsuccessful, so he decided to capitulate twice to Matthias with the aforementioned taking his revenge in rejecting it. After three weeks, Švehla feigned a breakout attempt in the front while getting out from the rear through a water channel. Though his physically weak and exhausted entourage of 2,000 infantry tried to elude the besieging forces, they were not fast enough to escape safely. Balázs Magyar and Pál Kinizsi rode down to the fort of Csejte (Čachtice), where they clashed. Almost all of the rioters fell, only 250 being taken prisoner. Svehla evaded capture again but was captured by peasants by the time he was too weak to fight.

Matthias condemned him to be hanged along with the remaining few hundred prisoners. This was a rather violent act regarding the campaigns of King Matthias Corvinus. On the very next day, 31 January 1467, witnessing the executions, the garrison asked for mercy, and it was granted; and after taking Kosztolány, he also offered František Hag – officer member of the resistance group – captainship in the Black Army, since he found him skilled enough. In another case in 1474, František Hag revolted due to lack of pay, but the conflict ended without violence, and he remained Matthias' subject until his death.

== Dissolution ==
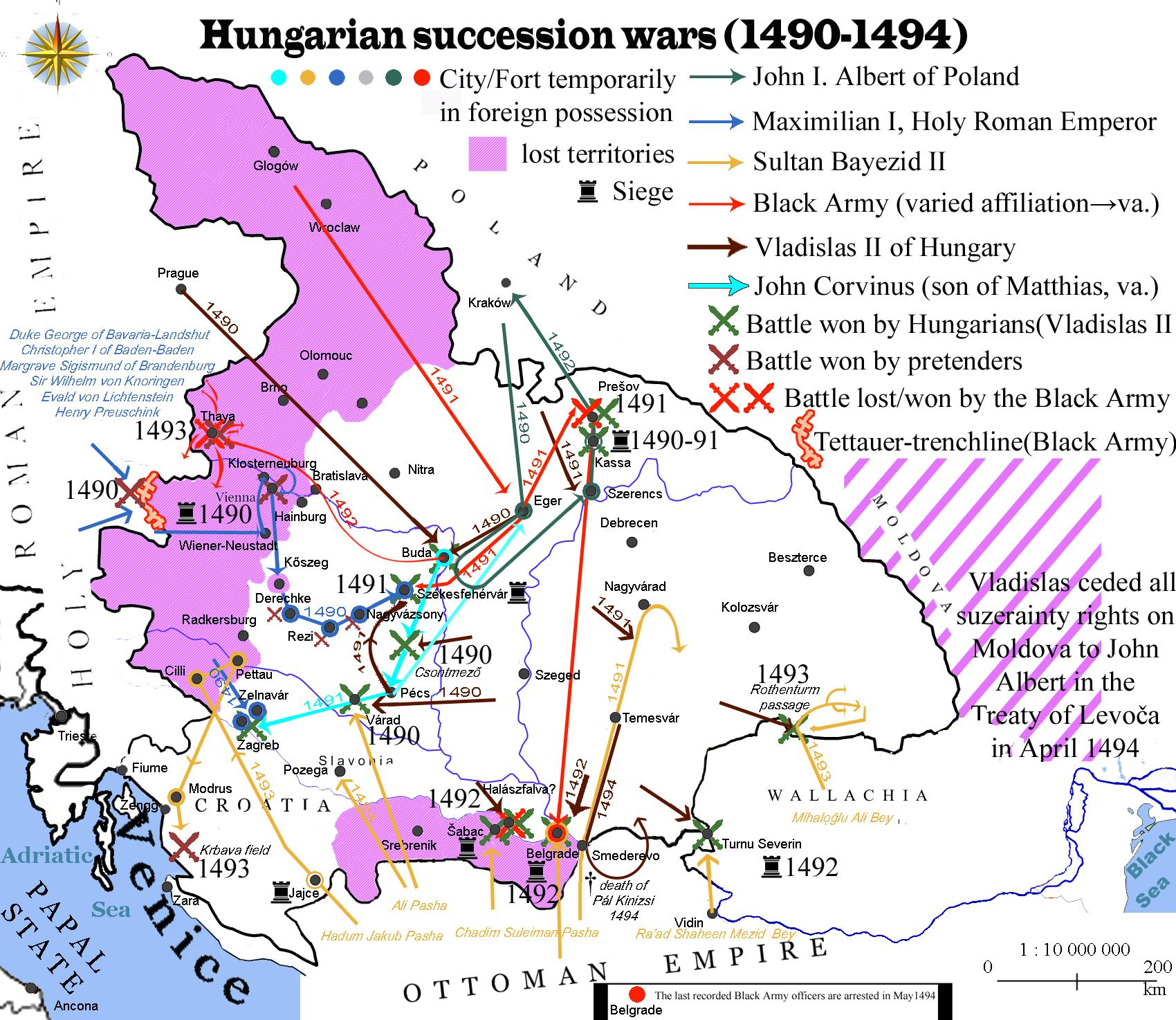
Actions of the Black Army after the death of King Matthias

Before his death on 6 April 1490, King Matthias asked his captains and barons to pledge an oath to his son John Corvinus and secure his succession to the throne. Though John was the biggest estate holder in Hungary and had the command over the Black Army, his stepmother, Queen Beatrice of Naples, invited two heirs, the Holy Roman Emperor Maximilian I and Polish prince John I Albert, for an assembly to be held at Buda to discuss who would inherit the throne. The former based his claim on the Peace Treaty of Wiener Neustadt, the latter on his family ties. Furthermore, the Hungarian barons invited a third pretender, the King of Bohemia and brother of John Albert, Vladislaus II. After the barons double-crossed John Corvinus, he escaped from the capital and was moving to Pécs, when he was attacked midway at Szabaton village and suffered a defeat from which he was able to retreat. No parts of the Black Army were yet involved, as their core was stuck in Silesia and Styria. Their famed captains Blaise Magyar and Paul Kinizsi joined the pretenders' side, John Albert and Vladislaus, respectively; the latter subsequently became the recognized king.

Maximilian immediately attacked the conquered territories in Austria in 1490. The Black Army fortified itself in the occupied forts on the western border. Most of them were captured by trickery, bribery, or citizen revolt in a few weeks without any major battles. The trenchline along the river Enns, which was built by mercenary captain Wilhelm Tettauer, resisted quite successfully for a month. Due to lack of payment, some of the Black Army mercenaries, mostly Czechs, switched sides and joined the Holy Roman army of 20,000 men in invading Hungary. They advanced into the heart of Hungary and captured the city of Székesfehérvár, which he sacked, as well as the tomb of King Matthias, which was kept there. His Landsknechts were still unsatisfied with the plunder and refused to go for taking Buda. He returned to the Empire in late December but left garrisons of a few hundred soldiers in those Hungarian cities and castles he occupied.

The National Council of the barons decided to recover the lost cities, especially Székesfehérvár. The Black Army was put in reserve at Eger, but their payment of 46,000 forints was late again, so they robbed the neighboring monasteries, churches, peasants and fiefdoms. After their dues were paid, appointed captain Steven Báthory gathered an army of 40,000 soldiers and began the siege in June 1491, which lasted for a month. More minor cities were recaptured, and without further support from the German nobility, Maximilian agreed to negotiate, and in the end, he signed the Peace of Pressburg in 1491, which included ceding the Silesian lands to him. John Haugwitz never recognized this treaty and held their possessions in Silesia afterwards.

Meanwhile, the disappointed John Albert gathered an army at the eastern border of Hungary and attacked the vicinity of Kassa (Košice) and Tokaj, also in 1490. John Corvinus accepted Vladislaus as his feudal lord and helped him in his coronation (he personally handed the crown to him). Vladislaus married the widowed Queen Beatrice in order to acquire her assets of 500,000 forints. This would have allowed him to cover the expenses of the Black Army stationed in Moravia and upper Silesia and the cost of transporting them home to Upper Hungary to defend it from the Polish army of John Albert. John Filipec, on behalf of the new king, helped to convince Silesian Black Army leader John Haugwitz to return to duty in exchange for 100,000 forints. The Hungarian–Czech army of 18,000 met the Polish troops in December 1491 in the Battle of Eperjes (Prešov), which was a decisive victory for the Black Army. John Albert withdrew to Poland and renounced his claim to the throne.

The Black Army was sent to the south region to fight the Ottoman invasions. While waiting for their wages, they sought plunder in the nearby villages. The National Council ordered Paul Kinizsi to stop the plundering at all costs. He arrived in Szegednic-Halászfalu in late August 1492, where he dispersed the Black Army led by Haugwitz. Of the 8,000 members, 2,000 were able to escape to western Styria, where they continued to pillage the countryside. The prisoners were escorted to Buda, where the Black Army was officially disbanded and they were allowed to leave abroad under the condition never to come back and claim their payment. They joined the forces already in Austria. They confronted Count Georg Eynczinger on 7 May 1493, at Thaya, where they were all killed or captured and tortured to death. The last remaining mercenaries were integrated into local garrisons, such as the one in Nándorfehérvár (Belgrade) under the leadership of Balthasar Tettauer, brother of Wilhelm Tettauer. They were so frustrated about their financial status that they allied with Ottoman Mihaloğlu Ali Bey to secretly hand over the fort to his sultan, Bayezid II. When their plan surfaced, Paul Kinizsi intervened in May 1494 before their act could take place. He arrested the captain and his troops for treason and starved them to death.

== Battles and respective captains of the Black Army ==
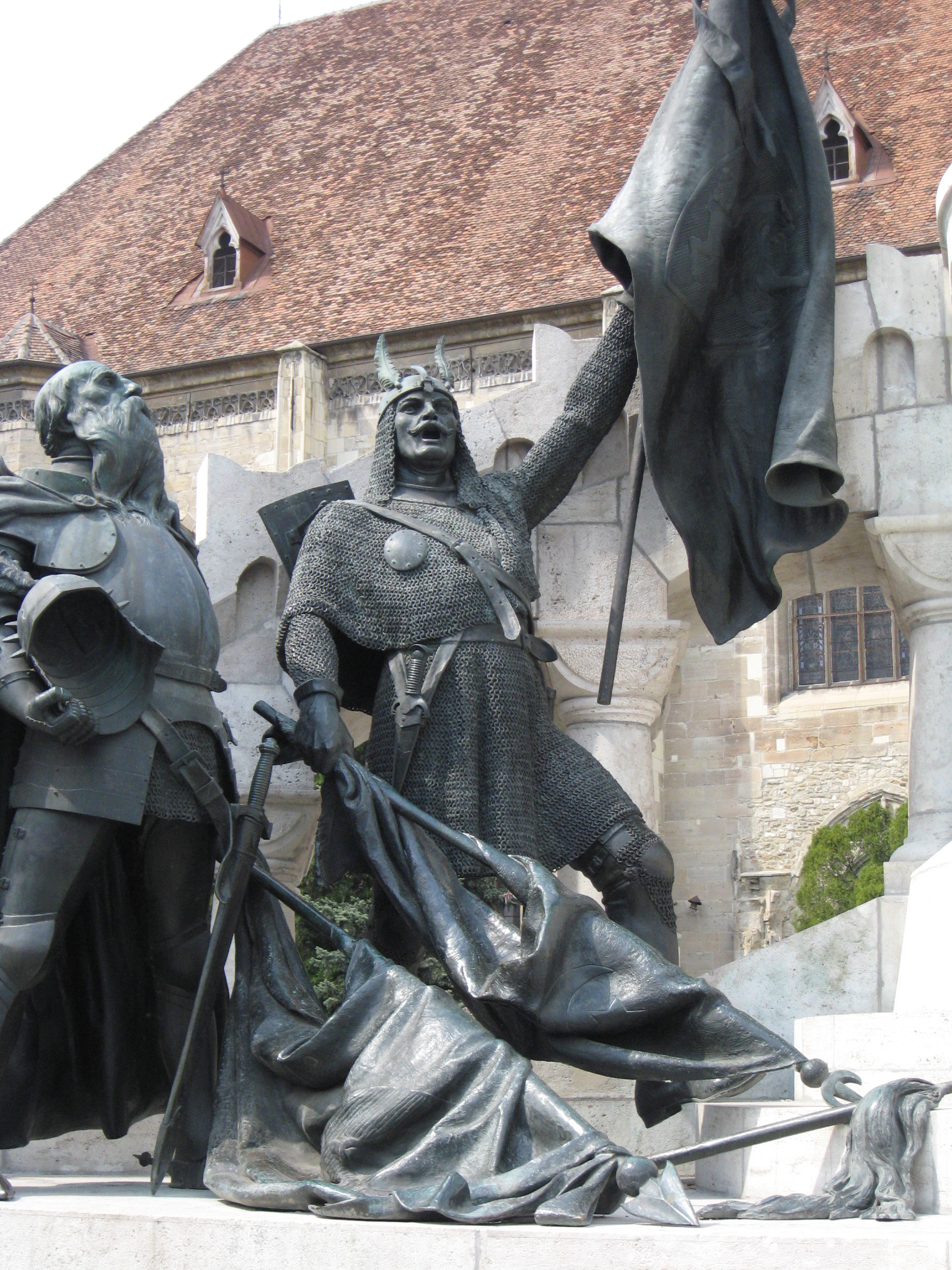
Paul Kinizsi, a Hungarian national hero. He was a general of the famed Black Army of the Kingdom of Hungary during the reign of King Mathias Corvinus. He is famous for his victory over the Ottomans at the Battle of Breadfield in 1479. He is reputed to have never lost a battle.

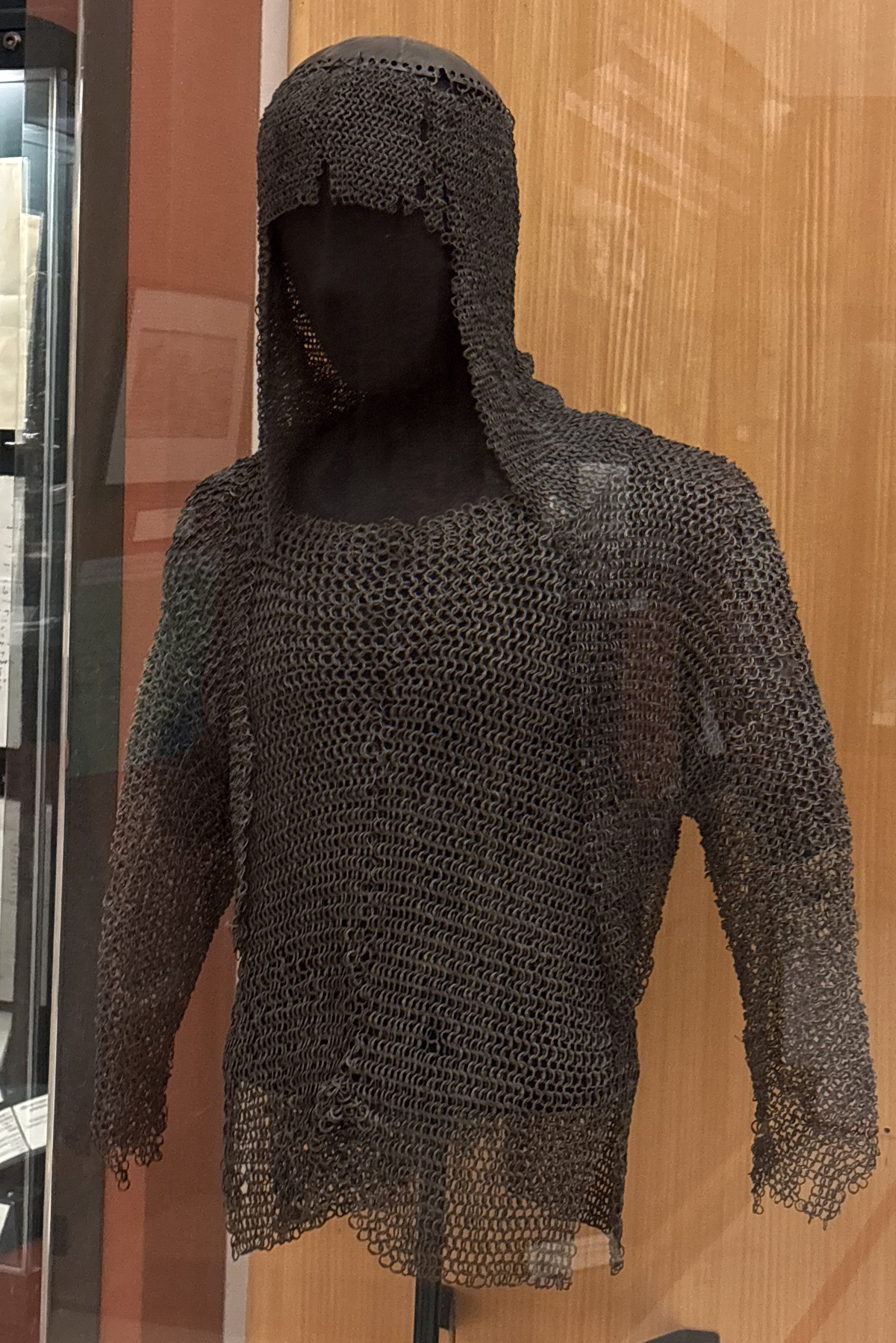
Chainmail shirt and mail coif of the Hungarian military commander Paul Kinizsi

Adolf Liebscher: George of Podjebrady observes the encircling army of Matthias.

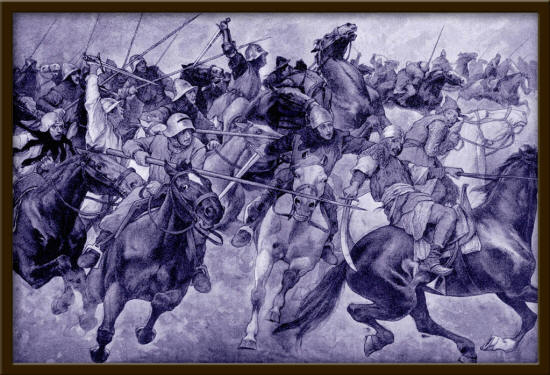
Věnceslav Černý: Henry Podebrady's victory over the Hungarians at Uherský Brod in 1469

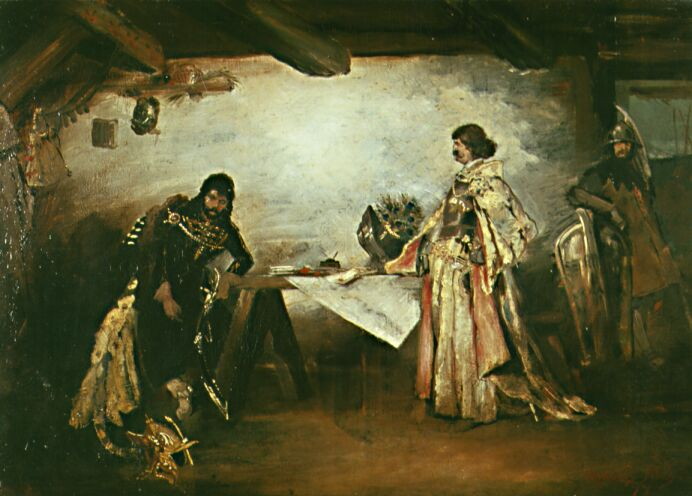
Mikoláš Aleš: Meeting of George of Podebrady with Matthias Corvinus

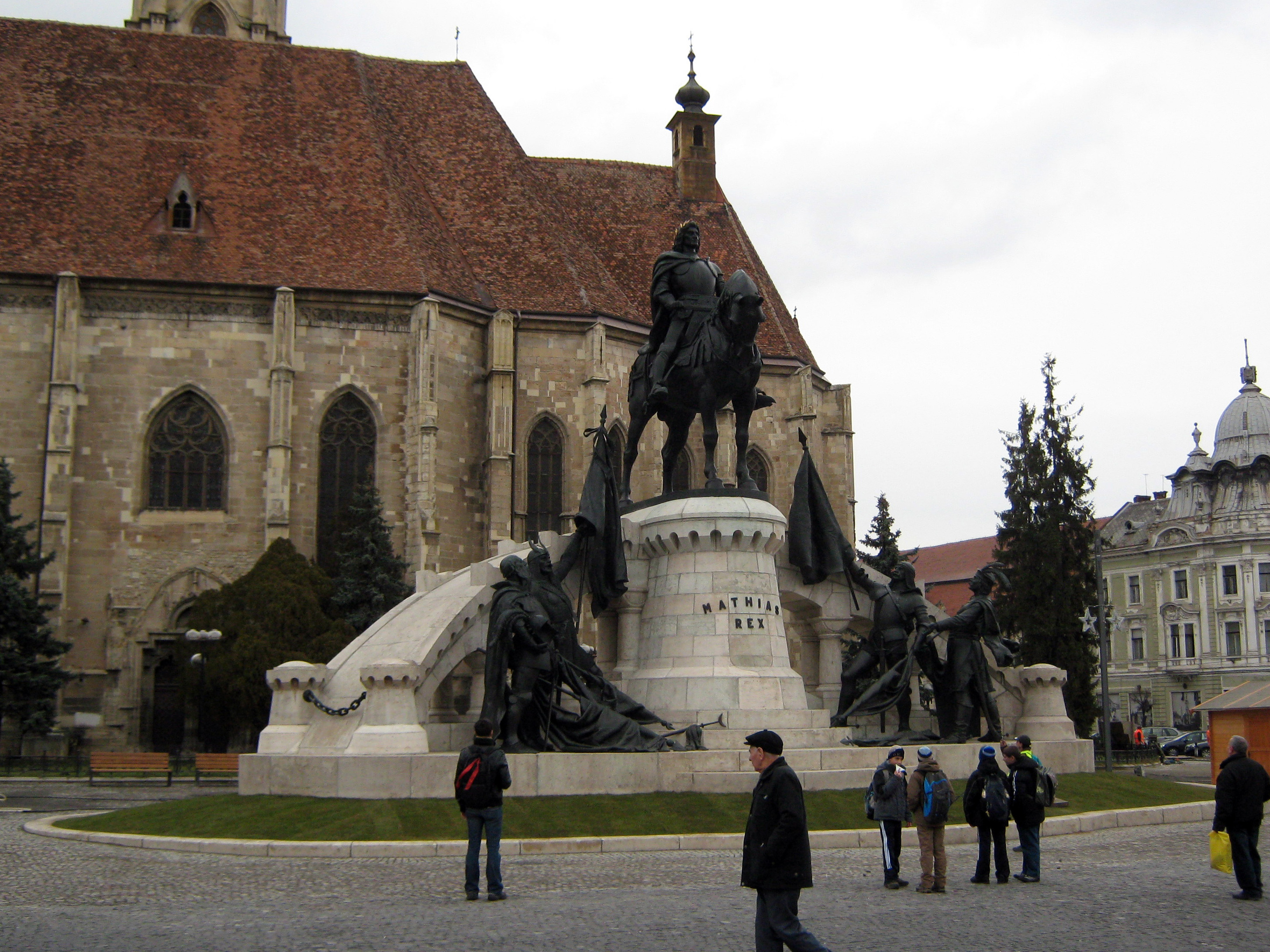
Statue of King Matthias and his generals in Cluj-Napoca. From left to right: Pál Kinizsi, Balázs Magyar, King Matthias, István Szapolyai and Stephen Báthory.

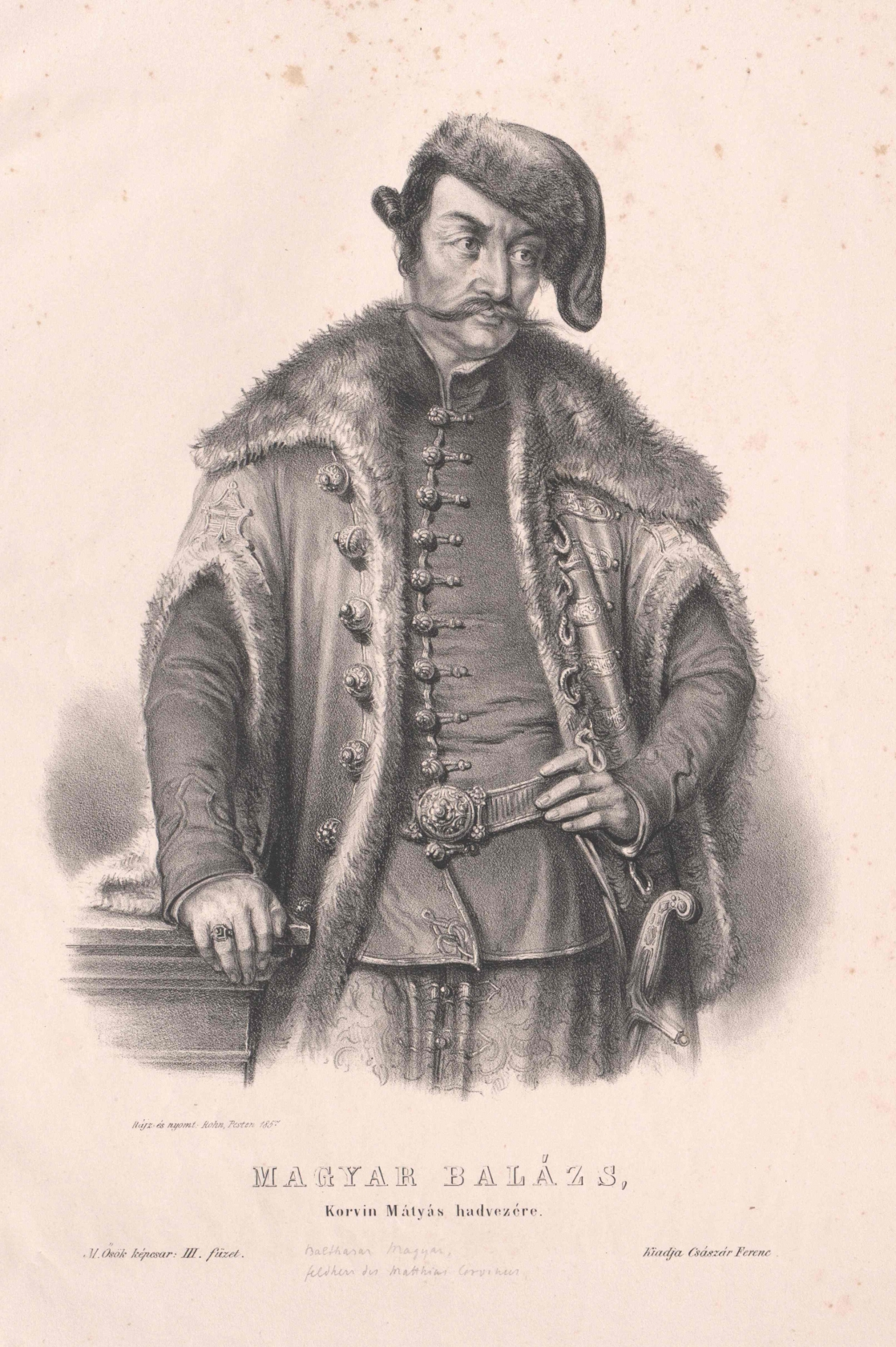
Portrait of Balázs Magyar

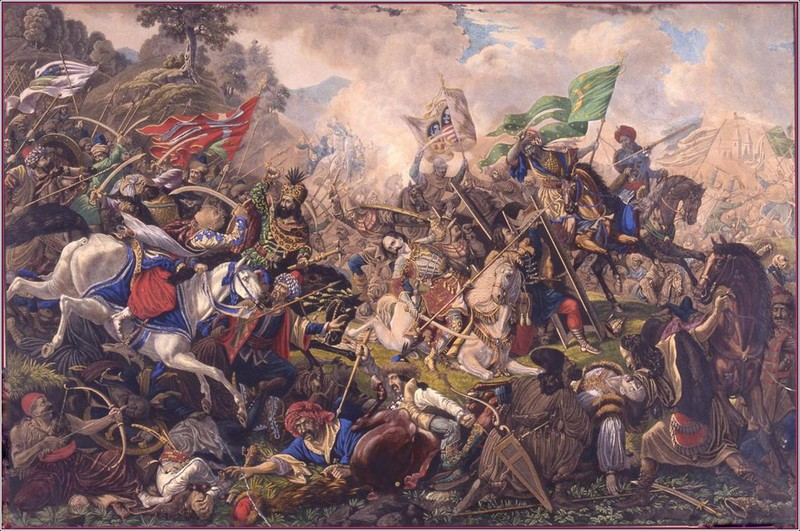
The Battle of Breadfield

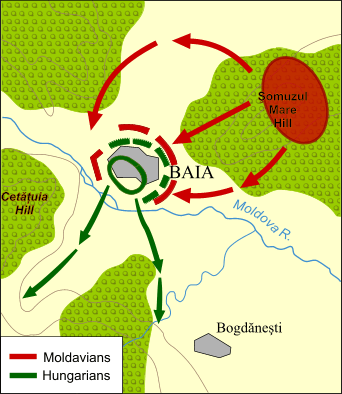
Battle plan at Baia depicting a typical wagon-fort formation, characteristic of Hungarian defense (and siege) strategy. Matthias was wounded in the back by arrows.

Battle plan at Vaslui

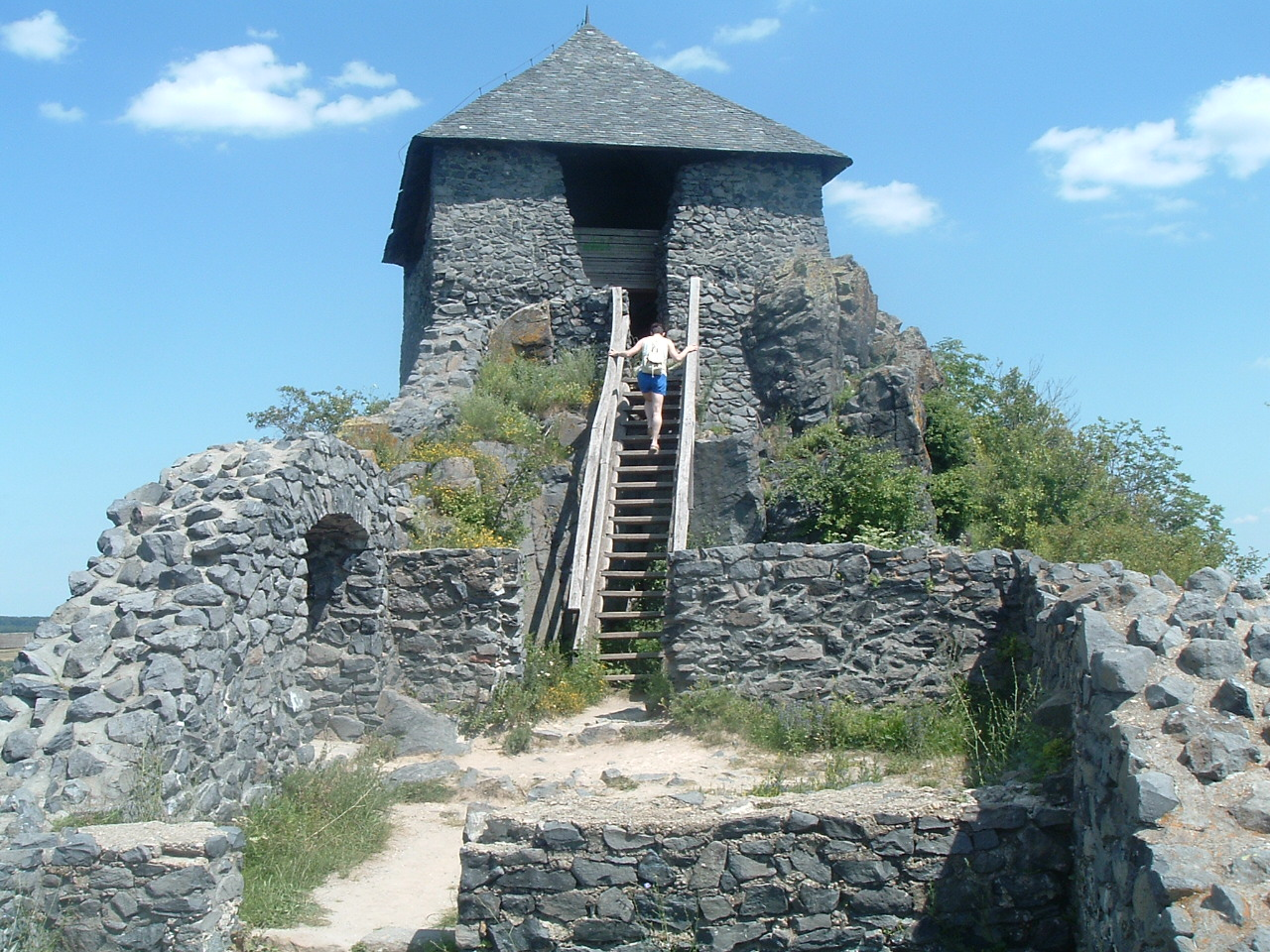
Castle of Salgó. Occupied by – then enemy – Jan Jiskra in 1450, it was retaken by Matthias in 1460. According to tradition, Matthias was cut on his face, and the scar angered him to the point where he launched an assault on the nearby Zagyvafő and destroyed the two castles to the ground.

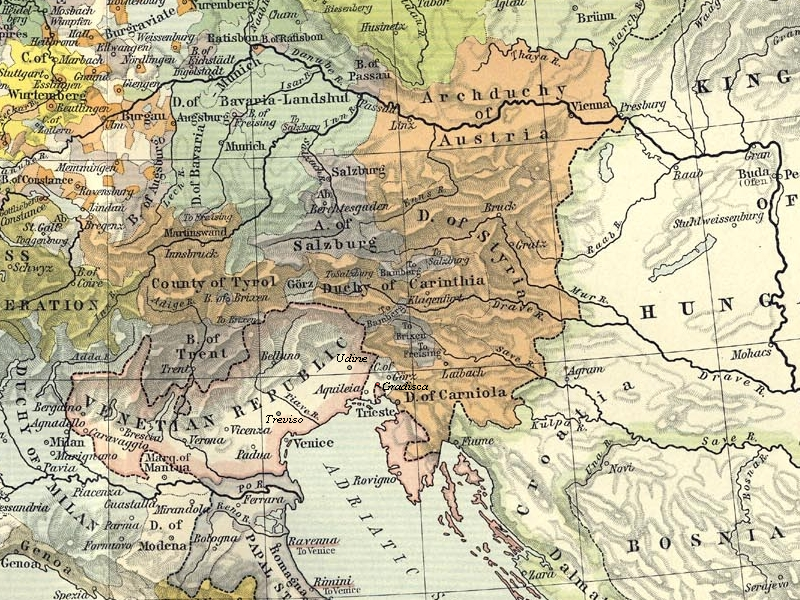
Austrian lands in 1477

List of battles and respective captains of the Black Army

Campaign color codes
| Against the Czechs |
| Against the Holy Roman Empire |
| Against the Ottomans |
| Against the Moldavians |
| Against the Papal State |
| Against Saxony |
| Against Venice |
| Against the Kingdom of Poland |
| Against the Hussites |

| War/ | Type | Size | Date | Location | Captain(s) commissioned | Outcome |
|---|---|---|---|---|---|---|
| Cz. | ۩ | | 1488 | ۩ Głogów, Duchy of Silesia | John Haugwitz; Wilhelm Tettauer; Francis Haraszthy | Victory |
| HRE | ỗ← | | 1484 | Leitzersdorf, Archduchy of Austria | Stephen Dávidházy; Tobias von Boskowitz und Černahora | Victory (Details) |
| HRE | ۩ | | 1484 | Korneuburg, Archduchy of Austria | Stephen Dávidházy^{†} Tobiáš of Boskovice and Černá Hora | Victory |
| Cz. Pl. | ۩ | | 1474 | Wrocław, Duchy of Silesia | Matthias Corvinus; Melchior Löbel; Jan II the Mad | Victory |
| Cz. | ỗ← | | 1468 | Olomouc, Margravate of Moravia | Matthias Corvinus | Victory |
| Cz. | ỗ← | | 1469 | Hradiště, Margravate of Moravia | Matthias Corvinus | Defeat |
| HRE | ۩ | | 1485 | Vienna, Archduchy of Austria | Matthias Corvinus | Victory (Details) |
| HRE | ۩ | | 1487 | Wiener-Neustadt, Archduchy of Austria | Matthias Corvinus; Emeric Zápolya; Wilhelm Tettauer; Bartholomew Drágffy of Beltiug; Jacob Szekler; Ladislaus Kanizsay; Peter Geréb of Vingard; Matthias Geréb of Vingard; Stephen V Báthory | Victory (Details) |
| HRE | ۩ | | 1480 | Radkersburg, Duchy of Styria | Stephen Zápolya; Jacob Szekler | Victory |
| HRE | ۩ | | 1482 | Hainburg, Archduchy of Austria | Stephen Zápolya; Wilhelm Tettauer | Defeat (Details) |
| HRE | ۩ | | 1482 | Hainburg, Archduchy of Austria | Matthias Corvinus; Stephen Zápolya | Victory (Details) |
| Ott. | ỗ← | | 1479 | Breadfield, Kingdom of Hungary | Paul Kinizsi Stephen V Báthory; Vuk Grgurević; Basarab Laiotă cel Bătrân | Victory (Details) |
| Mld | ỗ← | | 1467 | Baia, Principality of Moldavia | Matthias Corvinus Stephen V Báthory | Defeat (Details) |
| Ott. | ỗ← | | 1475 | Vaslui, Principality of Moldavia | Michael Fants (modest armed support for the main Moldavian core) | Victory (Details) |
| Ott. | ۩ | | 1463 | Jajce, Bosnia | Matthias Corvinus; John Kállay V. George Parlagi; Paul Kállay I. Provost Gaspar Bak of Berend; Matthias Geréb of Vingard | Victory (Details) |
| Ott. | ۩ | | 1464 | Jajce, Bosnia | Emeric Zápolya; Jacob Szekler | Victory |
| Ott. | ۩ | | 1464 | Srebrenik, Bosnia | Matthias Corvinus; Emeric Zápolya | Victory |
| Ott. | ۩ | | 1464 | Zvornik, Bosnia | Matthias Corvinus; Emeric Zápolya Count Sigismund Szentgyörgyi; Berthold Elderbach Monyorókeréki; Nicholas Székely Szentgyörgyi; Ladislaus Kanizsay | Defeat |
| Ott. | ỗ← | | 1476 | Šabac, Banate of Bosnia | George Matucsinai; Stephen V Báthory; František Hag^{†} Vuk Grgurević; Vlad Țepes; Sir Richard Champleyn | Victory |
| Ott. | ỗ← | ≠ | 1481 ≠ | Otranto, Kingdom of Napoli | Blaise Magyar | Victory (Details) |
| Pope | ỗ← | ≠ | 1488 | Naples, Kingdom of Napoli | Relief troops for his father-in-law the Neapolitan King | Victory |
| Sax. | ỗ← | ≠ | 1487 | Sankt Pölten, Archduchy of Austria | Matthias Corvinus | Victory (Details) |
| HRE | ỗ← | | 1459 | Körmend, Kingdom of Hungary | Simon Nagy Szentmártoni; Michael Rozgonyi^{†} (Note: Matthias I was proclaimed king by the Estates, but he had to wage war against Frederick III, Holy Roman Emperor who claimed the throne for himself. Several magnates, such as the Újlaki family, the Garai family and the Szentgyörgy family, supported the emperor's claim and proclaimed him king against King Matthias; the emperor rewarded the brothers Sigismund and John of Szentgyörgy and Bazin with the hereditary noble title "count of the Holy Roman Empire" in 1459 and they thus were entitled to use red sealing wax. Although the Counts Szentgyörgyi commenced using their title in their deeds, in the Kingdom of Hungary, public law did not distinguish them from other nobles. The tide turned when they were pleased by Matthias' promises, changed their affiliation and joined forces with him. The second battle thus was successful in defending the Hungarian crown and the integrity of the nobility. The precise location of the battle is unknown since the historical records only guess where it could have situated.) | Defeat |
| HRE | ỗ← | | 1459 | Upper Pannonia, Kingdom of Hungary | Simon Nagy Szentmártoni | Victory |
| HRE | ۩ | | 1484 | Bruck, Archduchy of Austria | Stephen Dávidházy | Victory |
| Ott. | ỗ← | | 1484 | Temesvár, Kingdom of Hungary | Paul Kinizsi | Victory |
| Ott. | ỗ← | | 1463 | Temesvár, Kingdom of Hungary | Ladislaus Pongrácz | Victory |
| Ott. | ỗ← | | 1476 | Pančevo, Despotate of Serbia | Béla Nagy; Ambrus Nagy; Peter Dóczy; Ladislaus Dóczy; Francis Dóczy; Emeric Nifor; Jan Chepely; Vuk Grgurević Demeter Jaksics; Francis Arifti; Jan Adei; Sebastian Abraham; Michael Pétsei; Markus Henei; Ladislaus Henei | Victory |
| Ott. | ỗ← | | 1482 | Zrenjanin, Despotate of Serbia | Paul Kinizsi; Peter Dóczy; Vuk Grgurević | Victory |
| Cz. | ỗ← | | 1469 | Vilémov, Kingdom of Bohemia | Matthias Corvinus (surrender) (Note: Matthias' attack followed a papal call for crusade against the heretic Bohemian king. He was promised that Frederick III would join, but it remained oral aid. The defeat at Vilémov happened to be a surrender by Matthias without actual battle due to him wrongly choosing the battleground. He was easily encircled by George of Poděbrady and was left with no option but to set an agreement. They met in a cottage in Ouhrov where they settled the conflict under the terms by which Matthias would help George's coronation be acknowledged by Pope Paul II. Furthermore, the succession of the Bohemian crown was set between the two kings with George ruling until his death and Matthias inheriting the throne afterwards. Matthias was set free in the counterpart though he abrogated the deal by crowning himself King of Bohemia shortly after.) | Defeat |
| Cz. | ỗ← | | 1469 | Uherský Brod, Margravate of Moravia | Matthias Corvinus | Defeat |
| Cz. | ۩ | | 1469 | Špilberk Castle, Margravate of Moravia | Matthias Corvinus | Victory |
| Ott. | ỗ← | | 1481 | Bosnasaray, Ottoman Empire | Matthias Corvinus; Vuk Grgurević | Victory |
| Ven. | ỗ← | | 1479 | Veglia, Principality of Krk | Blaise Magyar | Defeat |
| Pl. | ۩ | | 1471 | Nitra, Kingdom of Hungary | Matthias Corvinus; Emeric Zápolya (Note: Several sources differ whether a siege, sparse fightings, or retreat caused by famine occurred during the Polish-Hungarian conflict. Caused and followed by an internal revolt of Hungarian nobles and religious leaders led by Janus Pannonius, János Vitéz, and Emeric Zápolya. Casimir IV of Poland was invited and supported by the rebelling nobles so he stepped in and sent his son Casimir as a pretender to the Hungarian throne. He was promised Hungarian reinforcement as the nobles were to join him when he crossed the border. He led his army of 12,000 men towards Kassa where he was about to take the city without resistance. Meanwhile, Matthias was able to settle his dispute with the rebelling factions and convinced them to take his side. The parties agreed and so did Zápolya along with Nicolaus Chiupor de Monoszló who stopped the approaching Polish invasion from attempting to besiege Kassa by taking the city before him and fortifying themselves in. The prince turned to Nitra instead and occupied it. Matthias arrived there to liberate the city with his army of 16,000 mercenaries and banderias (banners). From this point on, the events are unclear; what is sure is that Casimir retreated with an escort cavalry and the rest of the Polish main forces were released shortly after. Finally the conflict was settled in the Treaty of Ófalu Contemporary historians' presentations differ on the causes of the outcome. Italian historian Antonio Bonfini commissioned by Matthias refers to it as being a siege, which resulted in heavy loss for the besieged due to famine for the first wave. He states that the second wave of Poles was slaughtered by peasants and citizens while marching home, while the prince fled days before, after meeting Matthias and had been spared by him. Hungarian Johannes de Thurocz agrees while adding that a counterattack followed the events where Hungarians attacked the counties of Zemplén and Sáros still under Polish possession and drove them out and intruded into Poland as well for prowling (it is worth noting that these events show remarkable similarities to those that took place two years later). While Polish historian Jan Długosz argues that the incursion happened upon invitation and that no state of war came into existence. He recalls the nobility's actions as betrayal and Casimir's steps as aid or some sort of help for the counts of Hungary. He also questions the circumstances of the retreat claiming it was a peaceful return after Casimir IV met with the Pope Sixtus IV's emissary in Kraków who intervened and urged the maintenance of peace. Based upon the aforementioned, the causes of retreat might be (any or multiple): Famine caused by siege; Casimir's disappointment with his former Hungarian allies and frustration that the project became more difficult to carry out; Agreement of military matters with Matthias on diplomatic grounds (status quo); Mediation of the pope and his calling for peace; Casimir's fear of being captured and Matthias' fear of triggering a possible "official" war with Casimir IV (reason for letting them retreat); Intrigue of the nobility to both sides) | Victory |
| Pl. | ۩ | | 1473 | Michalovce, Kingdom of Hungary | Matthias Corvinus; Demeter Jaksics; Michael Csupor^{†} | Victory |
| Pl. | ۩ | | 1473 | Humenné, Kingdom of Hungary | Matthias Corvinus | Victory |
| hss | ۩ | | 1460 | Salgó Castle, Kingdom of Hungary | Matthias Corvinus | Victory |
| hss | ۩ | | 1460 | Zagyvafő Castle, Kingdom of Hungary | Matthias Corvinus | Victory |
| hss | ۩ | | 1459 | Sajónémeti, Kingdom of Hungary | Matthias Corvinus | Victory |
| hss | ۩ | ≠ | 1459 | Hlohovec, Kingdom of Hungary | Sebastian Rozgonyi bishop Ladislaus Héderváry | Victory |
| hss | ۩ | ≠ | 1458 | Vadna, Kingdom of Hungary | Sebastian Rozgonyi bishop Ladislaus Héderváry | Victory |
| hss | ۩ | | 1459 | Sárospatak, Kingdom of Hungary | Sebastian Rozgonyi bishop Ladislaus Héderváry; Blaise Magyar | Victory |
| hss | ۩ | ≠ | 1460 | Gyöngyöspata, Kingdom of Hungary | Matthias Corvinus; Sebastian Rozgonyi bishop Ladislaus Héderváry | Victory |
| hss | ۩ | ≠ | 1458 | Jasov, Kingdom of Hungary | Sebastian Rozgonyi | Victory |
| hss | ۩ | ≠ | 1458 | Nižná Myšľa, Kingdom of Hungary | Sebastian Rozgonyi bishop Ladislaus Héderváry; Blaise Magyar | Victory |
| hss | ۩ | | 1462 | Kežmarok Castle, Kingdom of Hungary | Stephen Zápolya | Victory |
| hss | ۩ | ≠ | 1458 | Sečovce, Kingdom of Hungary | Sebastian Rozgonyi; Blaise Magyar | Victory |
| hss | ỗ← | | 1458 | Rimavská Seč, Kingdom of Hungary | Sebastian Rozgonyi | Victory |
| Mld | ۩ | | 1462 | Kiliya, Voivodate of Wallachia | Vlad Țepes (Hungarian garrison) | Victory |
| Mld | ۩ | ≠ | 1465 | Kiliya, Voivodate of Wallachia | (Hungarian garrison) | Defeat |
| Ott. | ۩ | ≠ | 1474 | Várad, Kingdom of Hungary | unknown, bishopric castle personnel (Note: On 7 February 1474, Mihaloğlu Ali Bey's unexpected attack took the town by storm. Ahead of his 7,000 horsemen, he broke through its wooden fences and pillaged the town, burned the houses and took the population as prisoners. Their goal was to rob the treasury of the episcopate, but were resisted by the refugees and clergy in the bishop's castle (at the time the bishop's rank was absent, and no records mention the identity of a possible captain). The town fell but the castle stood, forcing the Turks to give up the fight after one day of siege. While retreating, they devastated the surrounding areas.) | Def. Vic. |
| Cz. | ỗ← | | 1488 | Thomaswalde, Duchy of Silesia | John Haugwitz | Victory |
| hss | ۩ | ≠ | 1458 | Plaveč, Kingdom of Hungary | Emeric Zápolya | Victory |
| Pl. | ۩ | ≠ | 1474 | Árva, Kingdom of Hungary | Matthias Corvinus | Victory (Note: In March 1474, Polish booty-hunter mercenary captain Peter Komorovszki had already penetrated into the upper border region of Hungary and held several forts. He supported Prince Casimir in his attempt to acquire the Hungarian throne. Fed up with his presence King Matthias launched a campaign to regain his fortresses. The castles of Ružomberok, Hrádek, Sklabiňa, Olováry and Chynadiyovo surrendered without resistance. The remaining stronghold of Árva had been fortified and Komorovszki defended it himself. The standoff resulted in Matthias' offer of 8,000 gold florins in exchange for the castles, which Komorovszki accepted. He even agreed to let his mercenaries join the Black Army.) |
| Pl. | ۩ | ≠ | 1474 | Likavka, Kingdom of Hungary | Matthias Crovinus | Victory |
| HRE | ۩ | | 1480 | Maribor, Duchy of Styria | Stephen Zápolya; Wilhelm Tettauer | Defeat |
| Ott. HRE | ۩ | ≠ (Note: In 1480, Ottomans sought an option to plunder Styria. The Austro-Hungarian wars mobilized the Christian troops out of the area thus the Ottomans chose to interfere. Having been informed of the Ottoman approach Matthias sent John Haugwitz and his 1,500 mercenaries to face the Ottomans. After their arrival Haugwitz realized that the several thousand sipahis outnumbered them and chose to occupy the nearby fort of Neumarkt in Steiermark, which was still in the hands of the Holy Roman Emperor. The inhabitants sought protection against the Ottomans and so let Haugwitz's army into the city, successfully repelling the siege. After the relief of the beleaguerment, the Hungarians continued to hold the city until the death of Matthias in 1490) | 1480 | Neumarkt in Steiermark, Archduchy of Austria | John Haugwitz | Victory |
| HRE | ۩ | ≠ | 1477 | Stein, Archduchy of Austria | Johann Zeleny of Schonau | Defeat |
| HRE | ۩ | ≠ | 1477 | Gozzoburg, Archduchy of Austria | Johann Zeleny of Schonau | Defeat |
| HRE | ۩ | | 1486 | Eggenburg, Archduchy of Austria | Matthias Corvinus; Bartholomew Drágffy of Beltiug | Victory |
| HRE | ۩ | | 1486 | Laa an der Thaya, Archduchy of Austria | Matthias Corvinus | Victory |
| HRE | ۩ | | 1486 | Retz, Archduchy of Austria | Matthias Corvinus | Victory (Details) |
| HRE | ۩ | | 1485 | Kaiserebersdorf, Archduchy of Austria | Matthias Corvinus; Tobias von Boskowitz und Černahora | Victory (Details) |
| HRE | ۩ | | 1485 | Pitten, Archduchy of Austria | Matthias Corvinus | Victory |

Key

^{†} : Denotes captain deceased in battle
۩ : Denotes a siege (the dates at sieges concerns to the end of siege)
ỗ← : Denotes an open field battle
≠ : Denotes a minor conflict involving less than 5,000 Hungarian units
Cz. : Czechs
HRE : Holy Roman Empire
Ott. : Ottomans

Mld : Moldavians
Pope : Papal State
Sax. : Saxony
Ven. : Venice
Pl. : Kingdom of Poland
hss : Hussites
HUN : Hungary

Post-Matthias
Against Hungary

| War/ | Type | Size | Date | Location | Captain(s) commissioned | Outcome |
|---|---|---|---|---|---|---|
| HRE | ۩ | ≠ | 1490 | Ernsthofen, Kingdom of Hungary | Wilhelm Tettauer | Defeat |
| HRE | ۩ | | 1491 | Székesfehérvár, Kingdom of Hungary | Stephen V Báthory (supporting army) | Victory |
| Pl. | ỗ← | | 1491 | Prešov, Hungary | Stephen Zápolya; John Haugwitz (supporting army) | Victory |
| HUN | ỗ← | | 1492 | Szegednic, Halászfalu; Kingdom of Hungary | John Haugwitz | Defeat |
| HRE | ỗ← | ≠ | 1493 | Thaya, Holy Roman Empire | John Haugwitz^{†} | Defeat |
| HUN | ۩ | ≠ | 1494 | Belgrade, Kingdom of Hungary | Balthasar Tettauer^{†} | Defeat |

== Notes ==
=== Name variations ===
International usage of historical names
| Hungarian (surname, given name) | English (given name, surname) | Ethnolect (given name, surname) |
|---|---|---|
| Hunyadi Mátyás (Mátyás király) | Mat(t)hias Rex, Mat(t)hias Corvin, Mat(t)hias Corvinus, Mat(t)hias Hunyadi, Mat(t)hias Korwin | Czech: Matyáš Korvín, Croatian: Matijaš Korvin, German: Matthias Corvinus, Medieval Latin: Mattias Corvinus, Polish: Maciej Korwin, Romanian: Matia/Matei/Mateiaş Corvin, Serbian: Матија Корвин/Matija Korvin, Slovak: Matej Korvín, Slovene: Matija Korvin, Russian: Матьяш Корвин/Matyash Corvin |
| Magyar Balázs | Balázs/Balazs Magyar, Blaž the Magyar | Croatian:Blaž Mađar, Slovak: Blažej Maďar, Spanish:Blas Magyar, German:Blasius Magyar, Italian:Biagio Magiaro |
| Kinizsi Pál | Paul/Pál Kinizsi | Romanian:Pavel Chinezul, Slovak: Pavol Kiniži, Spanish:Pablo Kinizsi |
| (S)Zápolya(i) Imre, S)Zapolya(i) Imre, Szipolyai Imre | Emeric Zapolya, Emeric Zapolyai, Emeric Szapolya, Emeric Szapolyai, Emrich of Zapolya | Polish: Emeryk Zápolya, Slovak: Imrich Zápoľský, Spanish: Emérico Szapolyai (de Szepes), German: Stefan von Zips |
| Gis(z)kra János | John Giskra, John Jiskra | Czech: Jan Jiskra z Brandýsa, German: Johann Giskra von Brandeis, Italian:Giovanni Gressa, Slovak: Ján Jiskra z Brandýsa |
| Löbl Menyhért | Melchior Löbel, Melchior Loebel, Melchior Löbl, Melchior Loebl | German: Melchior Löbel |
| Haugwitz János | John Haugwitz | German: Johann Haugwitz, Czech: Hanuš Haugvic z Biskupic |
| Báthory István, Báthori István | Stephen V Báthory, Stephen Báthory of Ecsed | Romanian: Ștefan Báthory, German: Stephan Báthory von Ecsed, Italian: Stefano Batore, Slovak: Štefan Bátory |
| Csupor Miklós | Nicolaus Chiupor, Nicolaus Csupor | Romanian: Nicolae Ciupor |
| Jaksics Demeter | Demetrius Jaksic | Serbian: Dmitar Jakšić |
| Újlaki Miklós | Nicholaus of Ujlak, Nicholaus Iločki | Croatian: Nikola Iločki |
| Hag Ferenc | František Hag | Czech: František z Háje, German: Franz von Hag |
| Tettauer Vilmos | Wilhelm Tettauer | Czech: Vilém Tetour z Tetova |

== See also ==
- Austrian–Hungarian War (1477–88)
- Bohemian–Hungarian War (1468–78)
- Battle of Leitzersdorf
- Growth of the Ottoman Empire
- Hussite Wars
- Siege of Hainburg
- Second siege of Hainburg
- Siege of Kaiserebersdorf
- Siege of Retz
- Siege of Vienna (1485)
- Siege of Wiener Neustadt
- Wagon fort
