= Siege of Retz =

1486 siege of the Austrian–Hungarian War

- Part of the Austrian–Hungarian War (1477–1488)
Date	4 October 1486^{[a]} – 10 October 1486
Location	Retz, Lower Austria
Result	Hungarian victory

Belligerents
Holy Roman Empire	Kingdom of Hungary

Commanders and leaders
Unknown	Matthias Corvinus

Units involved
Imperial Army	Black Army of Hungary

The siege of Retz was a conflict between the Holy Roman Empire and the Kingdom of Hungary in 1486. It was part of the Austro-Hungarian War. The Hungarian capture of the town eventually led to the prosperity of its wine industry.

== The siege ==
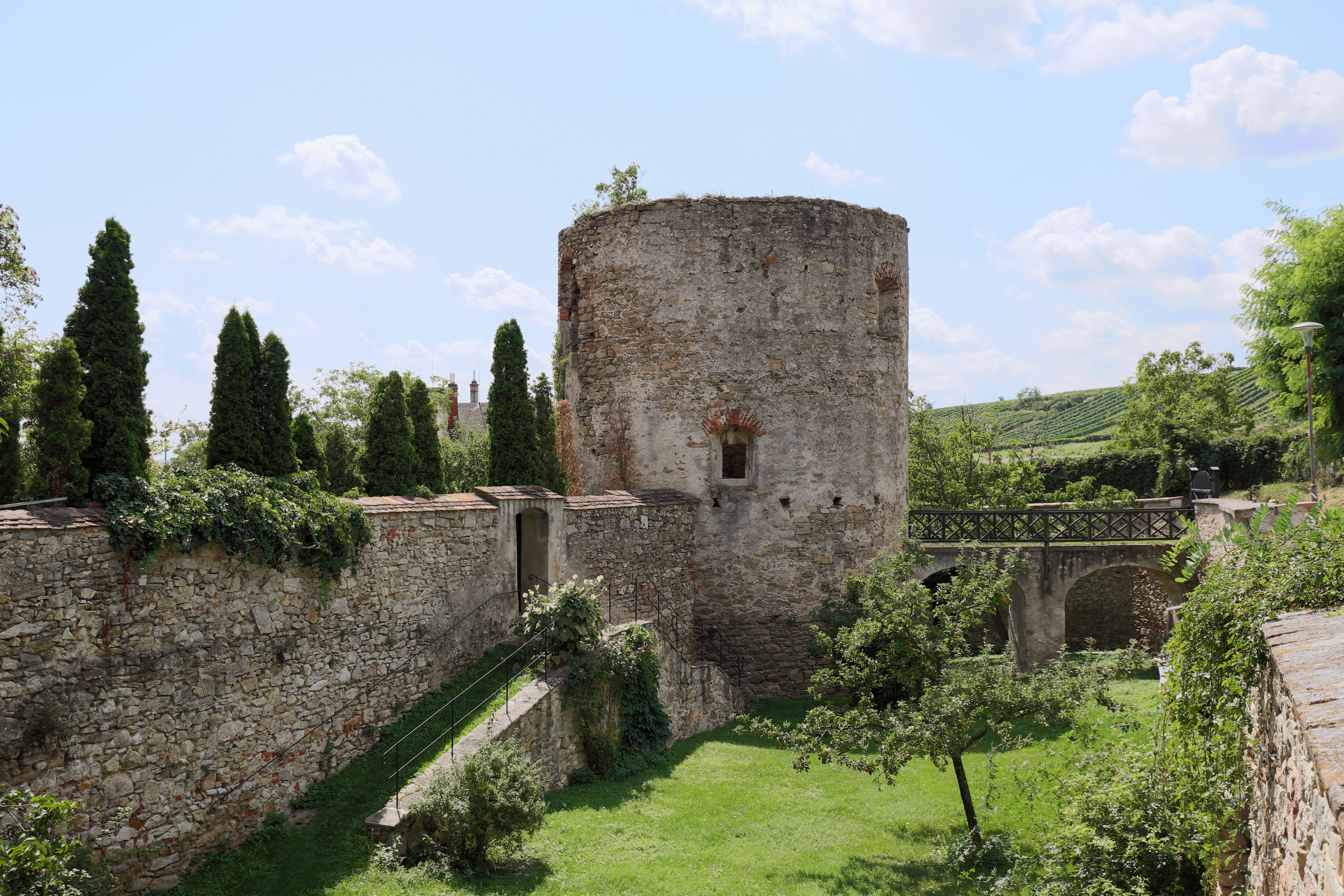
Haberveld tower of the fortification of Retz, Lower Austria

After the fall of Laa the Hungarian King Matthias Corvinus turned to Retz. He was accompanied by his son John Corvinus. He divided his army into three branches, one composed of mainly Bohemians, the second of Hungarians, and the third of the light cavalry of the Raci. He besieged the town with them on 4 October. The town was heavily fortified and required the engagement of siege weaponry. The garrison accomplished several break-outs, targeting the supply transports for the besiegers' encampment. These skirmishes caused minor casualties but were disturbing enough to make the king decide to draw the encirclement closer to the walls and to order their cannon bombardment. His army also undermined the towers of the town fort. The citizens of Retz realized it was time to surrender. The citizens were granted a royal pardon and Matthias entered the city on 10 October 1486.

== Aftermath ==
After the capture of the city he appointed Nikolaus Bethlen the captain of the city who started to build the castle later known as Gatterburg. Matthias Corvinus reissued the town's privileges, which is regarded as the origin of the construction of the multi-storeyed central wine cellars, and on 11 November, he ordered ten suburban villages to submit fermented wine to the town. In the same year he also allowed the citizens of Retz to export their wines to Northern Europe and even to the court of the Grand Duke of Moscow Ivan III of Russia. The architecture in the main square of Retz reflects the accumulated wealth from that time due to the greater growth of Retz's wine industry from Matthias's decision. Matthias stayed in the town several times, receiving envoys from France as well as the historian Antonio Bonfini, whom – after this visit – he hired as his personal historian.

== Footnotes ==
- ^{a} The earliest known recording is a letter from Matthias written from the encampment around Retz on 4 October, in which he orders the king's court judges to suspend the ruling over the dispute on Töttös de Báthmonostor-heritage between Auxiliary bishop Matthias Várday, Aladar Várday, Michael Várady and Jannus Várday until his arrival from Austria, whereas the King would judge the case in person.
