= Siege of Hainburg =

First siege of Hainburg
- Part of the Austrian-Hungarian War (1477–1488)
| Date | July 1482 |
| Location | Hainburg, Lower Austria |
| Result | Holy Roman Empire victory, Hungarians regroup at Pressburg. |

Belligerents
| Holy Roman Empire | Kingdom of Hungary |

Commanders and leaders
| Ruprecht von Reichenberg | Wilhelm Tettauer (POW); Stephen Zápolya (POW) |

Units involved
| Imperial Army | Black Army of Hungary |

Strength
| 1,000 cavalry 3,000 foot soldiers | 900 cavalry 200 foot soldiers |

Casualties and losses
| Unknown | 300 dead 70 POWs including Zápolya and Tettauer |

The siege of Hainburg was a two-siege of Hainburg conducted by Matthias I, King of Hungary, during the Austro-Hungarian War (1477–88). The first siege was broken in July 1482 by the Imperial Army of the Holy Roman Empire. Corvinus laid siege to the town again in August 1482, this time with better preparations, and took Hainburg in September 1482.

== Background ==
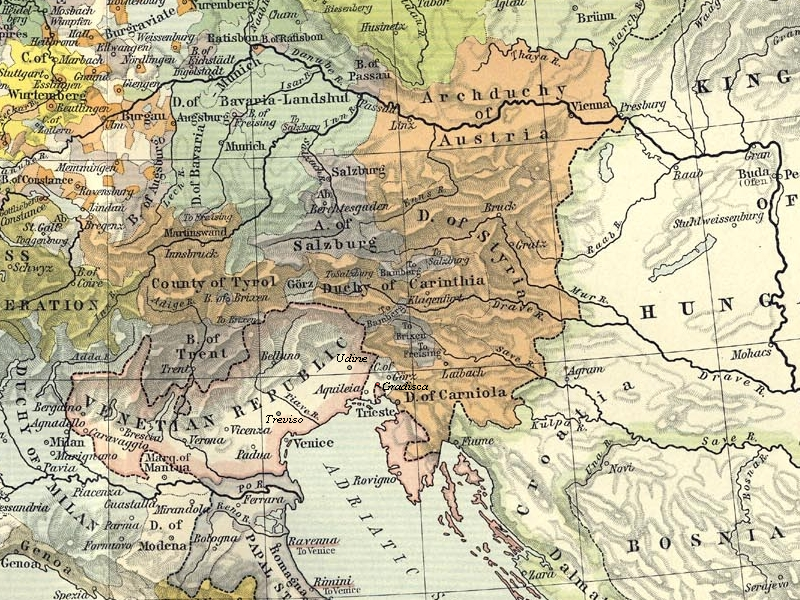
Duchies and principalities in the Austrian province in 1477

Matthias I assisted Frederick III, Holy Roman Emperor, during the Bohemian Wars. Subsequently, relations deteriorated when Frederick III formed a Holy Roman-Czech-Polish alliance in Nürnberg on 11 March 1474 against Hungary.

A period of rearmament and mobilization in 1477, followed by a short war, resulted in the Treaty of Korneoburg-Gmunden; the treaty required the Holy Roman Empire to pay 100,000 florins of reparations to Hungary. However, the sum was never paid despite several warnings and delays. As tensions rose, both countries began looking for allies amongst the other's nobility.

The situation was further inflamed by the defection of Johann Beckensloer, Archbishop of Esztergom in Hungary, to the Holy Roman Empire, where he laid claim to the Archbishopry of Salzburg. He left Hungary on a feigned pilgrimage to Aachen; the real reason was that he did not favor the Gabriel Rangoni of Verona, the Bishop of Gyulafehérvár. Beckensloer took part of the Hungarian treasury he had access to and lent it to Frederick III in exchange for Salzburg. The incumbent, Bernard II of Rohr, was convinced to step down, but Bernard II recanted and reasserted his claim the same year. The emperor had the canons of Salzburg ignore Bernard II's claim, who in turn sought the protection of Matthias I of Hungary on 18 November 1481. On Bernard II's behalf, Hungary seized the properties of the archdiocese of Salzburg in Styria and Carinthia by the end of the year. Since the archdiocese was a secular-independent principality with holdings spread across the secular provinces, this did not mean war with the Empire.

The Hungarian army confronted Imperial troops several times during the seizures. The ambiguous state of conflict led the Hungarians to occupy some Imperial castles, including Radkersburg, and resulted in the siege of Graz. Frederick III declared this a breach of the peace, but Matthias I replied that Hungarian troops were entering territories belonging to Archbishop Bernard II, and were there on the archbishop's invitation. Furthermore, the Hungarian king reminded the Emperor of the outstanding reparations payment from the Treaty of Korneoburg-Gmunden, which entitled Hungary to collect the debt by other means. Finally, Matthias I accused the Empire of taking advantage of Hungary during the then-ongoing Ottoman–Hungarian Wars, using the southern deployment of the Hungarian army to violate Hungarian territory, including an attack on Győr that killed 800 civilians.

In the spring of 1482, Matthias I sent 4,000 cavalry, led by Captain Johann Zeleny of Schonau, to plunder Austrian territory along the Danube up to Passau. The incursion was stopped by the intervention of Cardinal Antonio Caffarelli, Bishop of Ascoli, who organized a truce. Nonetheless, war was inevitable as both sides continued to strengthen their forces.

== First siege ==
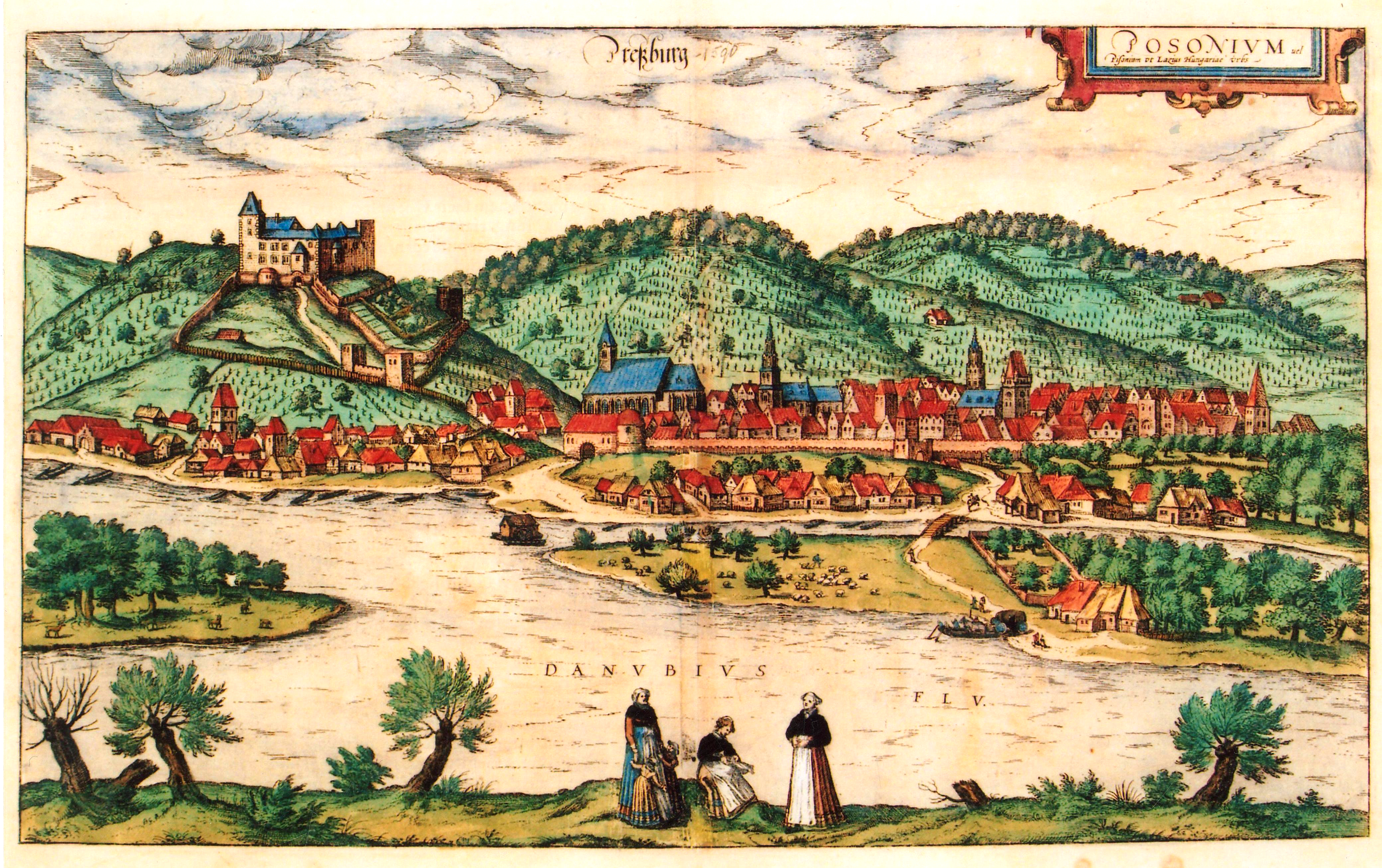
Presburg in the 16th century

On 4 July 1482, Matthias I assembled an army at Köpcsény and departed for Hainburg. The castle was situated on a hilltop surrounded by the Danube; the siege proceeded slowly due to the lack of siege weapons. The Empire deployed an army of 4,000 troops, led by Ruprecht von Reichenberg, to lift the siege. Matthias I dispatched troops to determine the size and location of the relief force. The Hungarian scouts ran into the Imperial army at Rohrau and launched a cavalry assault but could not break through the enemy's quadratic defense formation. The stiff resistance caused the Hungarians to retreat in disorder; Hungarian captains Wilhelm Tettauer and Stephen Zápolya attempted to hold the line but were trapped with 70 other nobles by Imperial pursuers.

The advance of the Imperial army forced Matthias I to lift the siege. The Hungarians abandoned their equipment and supplies as they retreated hastily to Presburg. Zápolya was taken prisoner but managed to escape after drawing the sword of a custodian and using it to kill the custodian; he rejoined the army at Presburg. The King of Hungary appealed to the nobility for reinforcements to join him at Presburg. Urban Dóczi, Bishop of Győr, raised 5,000 troops in 50 days at his own expense. The Raci horsemen of Slavonia also responded. Learning from the first experience, siege engines were also added, including the "Varga-mortar," which required 80 horses to move.

== Second siege ==
Second siege of Hainburg
- Part of the Austrian-Hungarian War (1477–1488)
| Date | mid-August 1482 – 30 September 1482 |
| Location | Hainburg, Lower Austria |
| Result | Hungarian Victory |

Belligerents
| Holy Roman Empire | Kingdom of Hungary |

Commanders and leaders
| Wolfgang Fuchs | Matthias Corvinus; Urban Dóczi; Johann Zeleny of Schonau; Bartholomew Beriszló † Francis Haraszti; Moses of Buzla; Vuk Grgurević; Stephen Zápolya |

Units involved
| Imperial Army | Black Army of Hungary |

Strength
| 1500 garrisoned 10.000 relief army | 15.000–18.000 men-at-arms supplies of 3000 wagons and 500 flotilla |

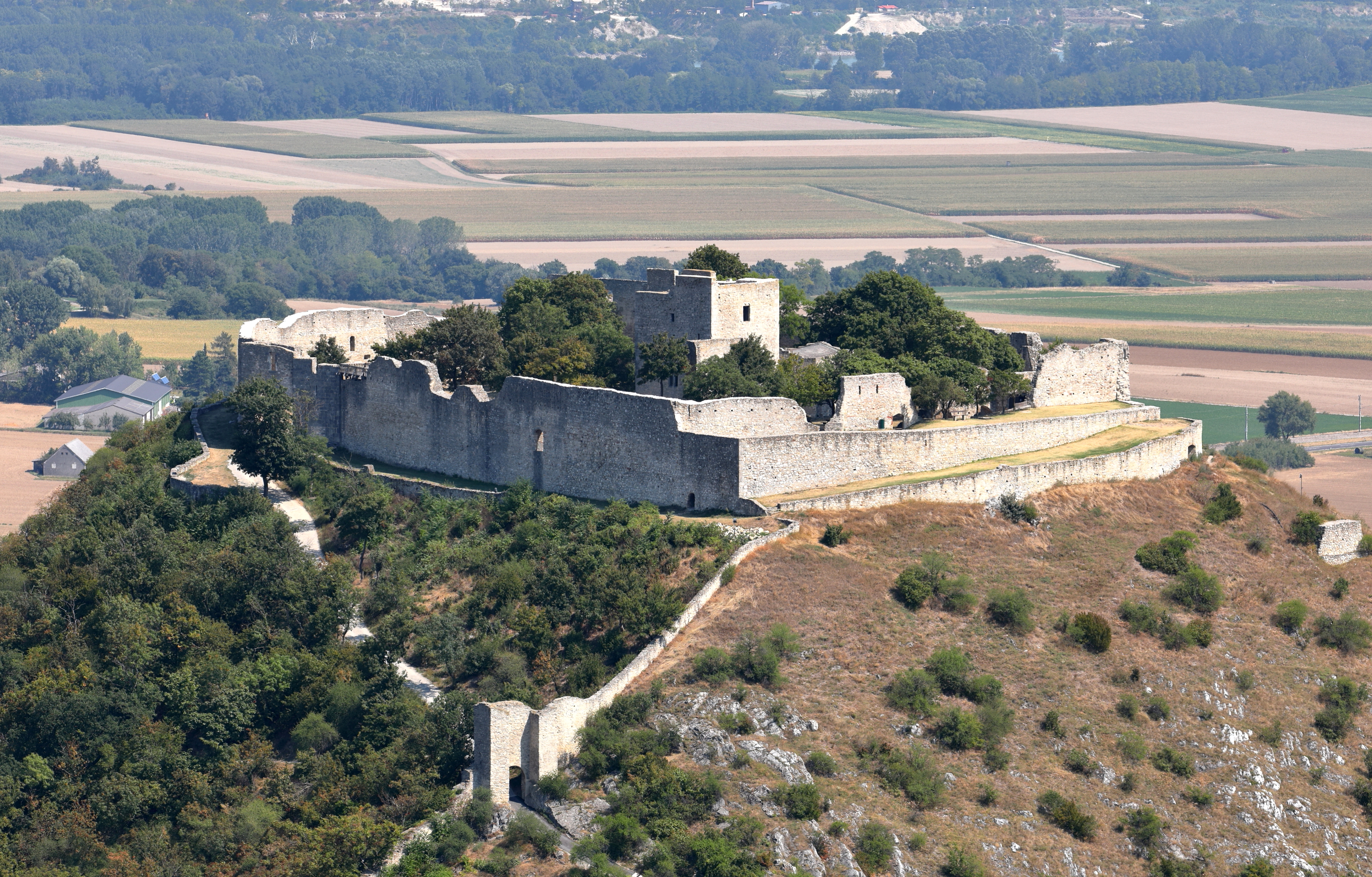
the castle of Hainburg

The quick regeneration of the Hungarian army at Presburg allowed the Hungarians to seize the initiative and march against Hainburg. On 20 September 1482, the Imperial army, now expanded to 10,000 troops, began the march back to lift the siege. Matthias I took 8,000 troops to attack the relief army, leaving the rest to maintain the siege. The Hungarians dug in after seeing the size of the enemy army, while the Imperial army prepared to send supplies into the town. During the lull, both sides bombarded the other's outposts. Hungarian sentries foiled an attempt by the Empire to sneak 42 wagons into Hainburg.

On 23 September 1482, Prior Bartholomew Beriszló launched a surprise, and unauthorized, cavalry attack on Imperial positions; this caused Imperial forces to abandon their fortifications and retreat with their wagons towards Bruck. Matthias I declined to pursue despite the urgings of several subordinates. Nonetheless, Francis Haraszti and Moses of Buzla led an unauthorized cavalry assault on the Imperial remnants; Haraszti died from a shoulder cut, and Moses was also wounded. All other attempts were forbidden.

Matthias I returned to Hainburg to prosecute the siege. The town fell after a week of heavy bombardment. The defenders, led by Wolfgang Fuchs, agreed to surrender in exchange for 3000 florins and free passage. Taking the town had cost the King of Hungary 200.000 florins.
