= Corseque =

Renaissance polearm

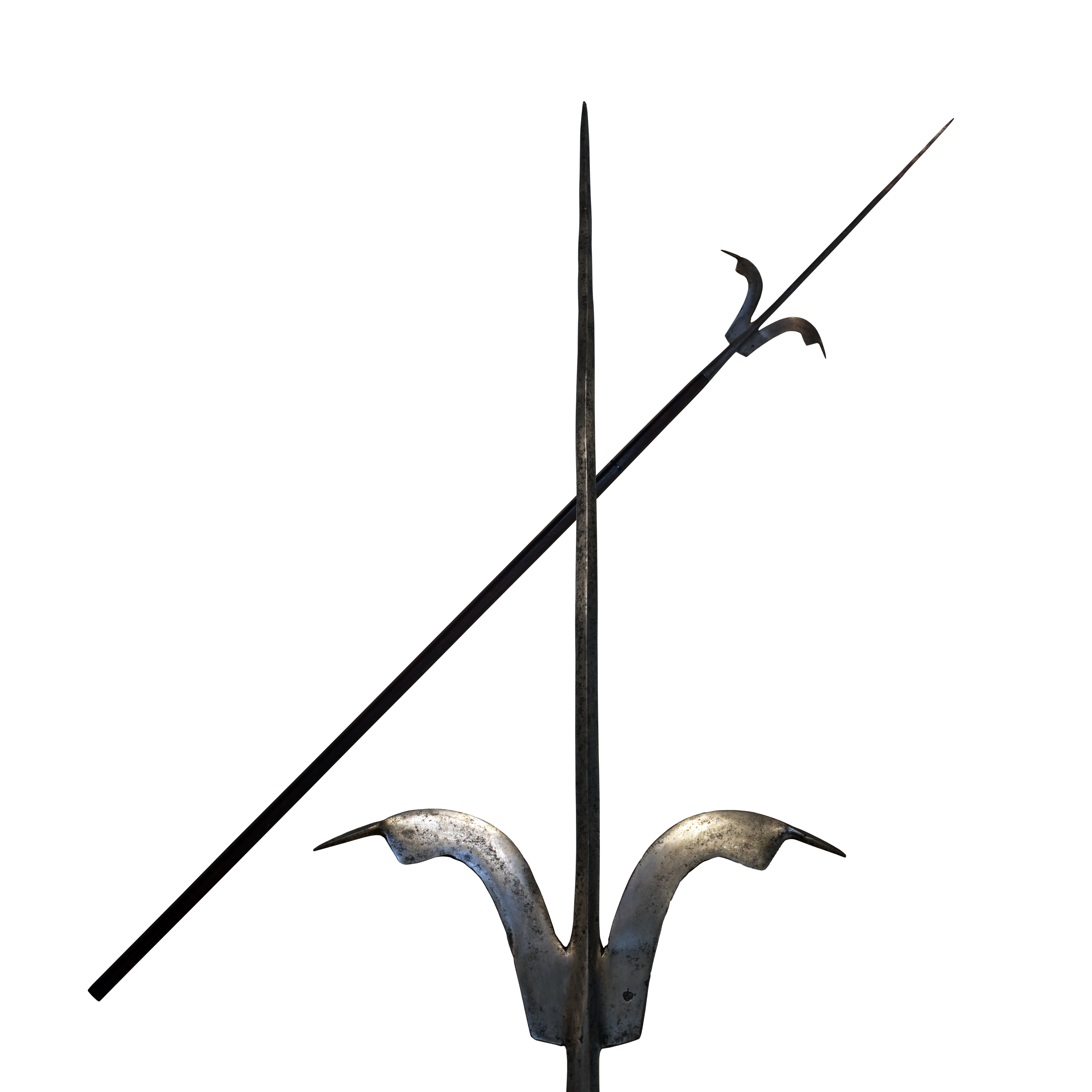
Corseque, ca. late 16th – early 17th century. On display at Morges military museum.

The corseque is a type of European polearm, characterised by a three-lobe blade on a 1.8 to 2.5 m (5 ft 11 in to 8 ft 2 in) shaft. The head features a long spike and two shorter and stronger lateral blades.

The Corseque is said to have originated in Corsica, from where it takes its name; at the end of the Middle Ages many Corsicans leaving the island to become mercenaries in Terra Firma

It would have evolved from the spetum or pertuisnane, in the later Middle Ages.

It was popular in Europe in the 16th and 17th centuries. Surviving examples have a variety of head forms, but there are two main variants, one with the side blades (known as flukes or wings) branching from the neck of the central blade at 45 degrees, the other with hooked blades curving back towards the haft. The corseque is usually associated with the rawcon, ranseur and runka. Another possible association is with the "three-grayned staff" (grayned meaning "bladed") listed as being in the armoury of Henry VIII in 1547 (though the same list also features 84 rawcons, suggesting the weapons were not identical in 16th century English eyes). Another modern term used for particularly ornate-bladed corseques is the chauve-souris.
