= Nižná Myšľa =

Nižná Myšľa Alsómislye
- Municipality
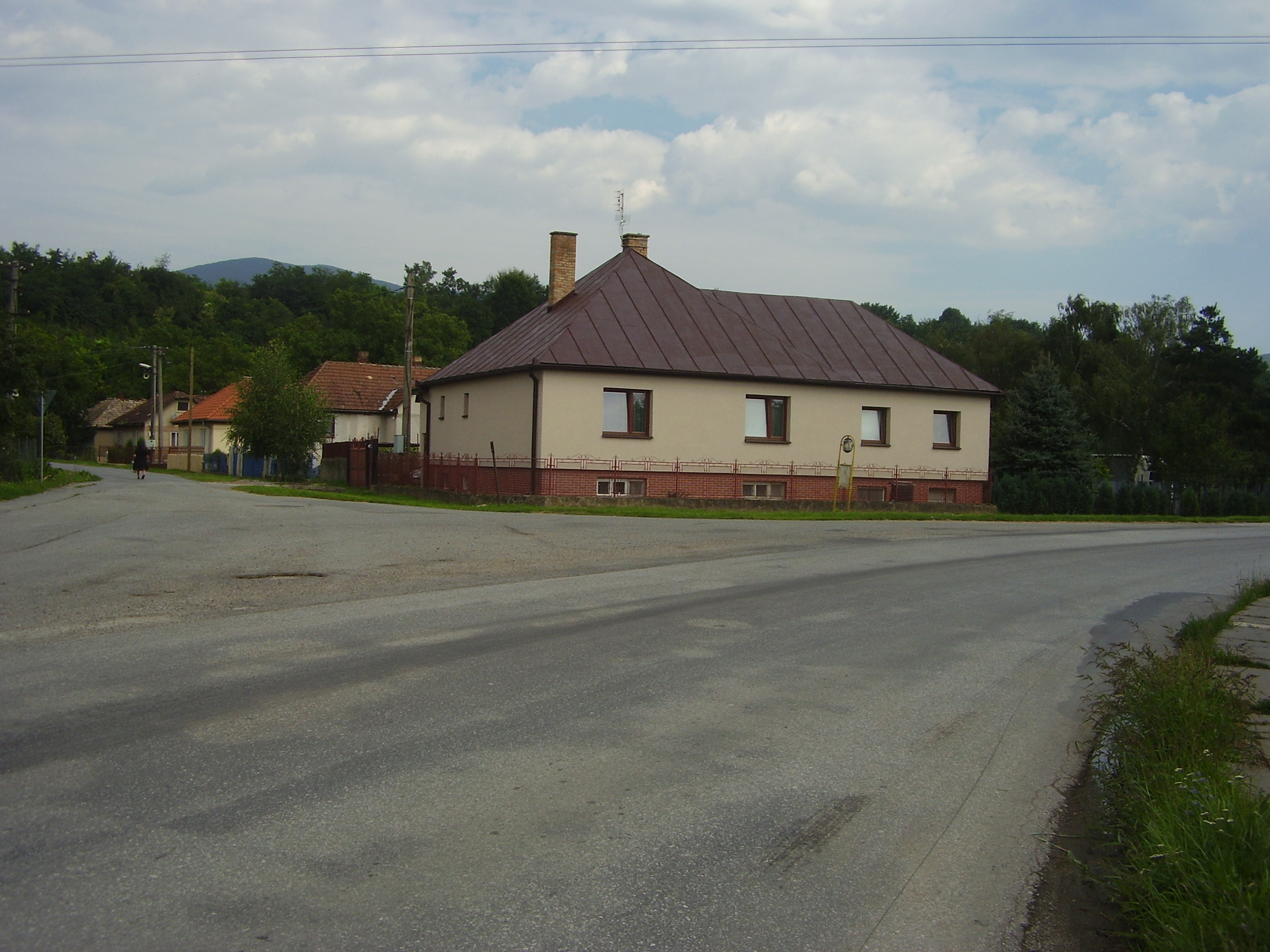

- Flag

- Location of Nižná Myšľa in the Košice Region Location of Nižná Myšľa in Slovakia
- Coordinates: 48.62°N 21.37°E
- Country: Slovakia
- Region: Košice Region
- District: Košice-okolie District
- First mentioned: 1270

Area
  - Total: 12.61 km^{2} (4.87 sq mi)
- Elevation: 207 m (679 ft)

Population (2025)
  - Total: 1,615
- Time zone: UTC+1 (CET)
  - Summer (DST): UTC+2 (CEST)
- Postal code: 441 5
- Area code: +421 55
- Vehicle registration plate (until 2022): KS
- Website: www.niznamysla.sk

Nižná Myšľa (Hungarian: Alsómislye) is a village and municipality in the Košice-okolie District in the Kosice Region of eastern Slovakia.

== History ==
In historical records, the village was first mentioned in 1270.

== Geography ==
The municipality lies at an altitude of 207 metres (679 ft) and covers an area of 12.61 km^{2} (4.87 sq mi) (2025).

== Population ==
Population statistic (10 years)
Year	1995	2005	2015	2025
Count	1240	1416	1679	1615
Difference		+14.19%	+18.57%	−3.81%

Population statistic
Year	2024	2025
Count	1615	1615
Difference		+1.42%

It has a population of 1615 people (31 December 2025).

=== Ethnicity ===
Census 2021 (1+ %)
Ethnicity	Number	Fraction
Slovak	1448	92.34%
Romani	243	15.49%
Not found out	96	6.12%
Rusyn	16	1.02%
Total	1568	

In year 2021 was 1568 people by ethnicity 1448 as Slovak, 243 as Romani, 96 as Not found out, 16 as Rusyn, 15 as Czech, 5 as Polish, 5 as Other, 2 as Chinese, 2 as Ukrainian, 2 as Russian, 2 as Hungarian, 2 as French, 1 as Jewish and 1 as Irish.

Note on population: The difference values of population numbers in the table "Population statistic" and in the sections "Ethnicity" & "Religion" is caused by the use of various statistical methods.

=== Religion ===
Census 2021 (1+ %)
Religion	Number	Fraction
Roman Catholic Church	1161	74.04%
None	208	13.27%
Not found out	109	6.95%
Greek Catholic Church	42	2.68%
Total	1568	

In year 2021 was 1568 people by religion 1161 from Roman Catholic Church, 208 from None, 109 from Not found out, 42 from Greek Catholic Church, 13 from Calvinist Church, 11 from Eastern Orthodox Church, 9 from Evangelical Church, 3 from Other, 3 from Seventh-day Adventist Church, 3 from Apostolic Church, 2 from Paganism and natural spirituality, 1 from Christian Congregations in Slovakia, 1 from Hinduism, 1 from United Methodist Church and 1 from Bahá'i Community.
