= List of wars involving Austria =

This article is an incomplete list of wars and conflicts involving Austria.

Victory
Defeat
Another result
Ongoing

Date	Name of Conflict	Allies	Enemies	Outcome
170	Battle of Carnuntum	Roman Empire	Marcomanni; Quadi	Germanic victory
10/12 August 943	Battle of Wels (part of Hungarian invasions of Europe)	East Francia: Duchy of Bavaria; March of Carinthia	Principality of Hungary	Bavarian–Carantanian victory

== Margraviate of Austria (976–1156) ==
Start	Finish	Name of Conflict	Belligerents		Outcome
Start	Finish	Name of Conflict	Allies	Enemies	Outcome
976	978	War of the Three Henries (976–978)	Holy Roman Empire	Duchy of Bavaria	Bavarian defeat: Birth of Austria, Leopold I becomes Margrave of Austria
1015	1015	Bolesław I's first invasion of the Austria	Holy Roman Empire	Duchy of Poland	Victory: Polish invasion of Austria fails
1017	1017	Bolesław I's second invasion of the Austria	Holy Roman Empire	Duchy of Poland	Victory: Polish invasion of Austria fails
1030	1031	Conrad II's invasion of Hungary	Holy Roman Empire	Kingdom of Hungary	Defeat
1040	1041	Henry III's invasion of Bohemia	Holy Roman Empire	Duchy of Bohemia	Victory
1042	1044	Henry III's invasion of Hungary	Holy Roman Empire; Peter Orseolo's Hungary	Samuel Aba's Hungary	Victory: Battle of Ménfő; Peter Orseolo reinstated as king of Hungary
29 June 1073	27 October 1075	Saxon Rebellion	Holy Roman Empire	Duchy of Saxony	Victory: Rebellion suppressed
12 May 1082	12 May 1082	Battle of Mailberg	Margraviate of Austria: County of Bogen	Duchy of Bohemia	Defeat
11 September 1146	11 September 1146	Battle of the Fischa	Duchy of Bavaria: March of Austria	Kingdom of Hungary	Defeat
1147	1150	Second Crusade	Kingdom of France; Holy Roman Empire; Byzantine Empire; Kingdom of England; Kingdom of Sicily; Kingdom of Portugal; County of Barcelona; León–Castile; Kingdom of Jerusalem; County of Tripoli; Principality of Antioch; Knights Templar	Seljuk Empire; Fatimid Caliphate; Almoravids	Defeat: Lisbon captured by the Portuguese; Tarragona and Tortosa captured by the Catalans

== Duchy of Austria (1156–1453) ==
Start	Finish	Name of Conflict	Belligerents		Outcome	Notable battles
Start	Finish	Name of Conflict	Allies	Enemies	Outcome	Notable battles
11 May 1189	2 September 1192	Third Crusade	Angevin Empire; Holy Roman Empire; Kingdom of Hungary; Republic of Genoa; Kingdom of Navarre; Republic of Pisa; Kingdom of Jerusalem; Principality of Antioch; Knights Templar; Knights Hospitaller; Teutonic Order	Ayyubid Sultanate; Sultanate of Rum; Nizari Ismaili state (the Assassins); Byzantine Empire; Cyprus	Victory: Treaty of Ramla	
22 September 1197	1 July 1198	Crusade of 1197	Holy Roman Empire; Kingdom of Cyprus; Duchy of Brabant; Duchy of Austria; Landgraviate of Thuringia; County Palatine of the Rhine; Duchy of Merania; Bishopric of Passau; Bishopric of Hildesheim; Bishopric of Halberstadt; County of Gorizia	Ayyubids	Victory: Beirut restored to the Kingdom of Jerusalem; Jaffa Re-Captured by the Ayyubids after the Third Crusade; Crusader Failure to Re-Capture Jerusalem	
July 1209	April 12, 1229	Albigensian Crusade	Crusade: Crusader volunteers; Episcopal Inquisition; Dominican Order; Kingdom of France	Cathars; County of Toulouse; Viscounty of Béziers and Albi; Crown of Aragon; County of Foix; Viscounty of Carcassonne; Kingdom of England	Victory: Treaty of Paris	
1217	1221	Fifth Crusade	Crusaders: Holy Roman Empire; Kingdom of Portugal; Kingdom of Hungary; Kingdom of France; Kingdom of Germany; Levant: Kingdom of Jerusalem; Kingdom of Cyprus; Latin Empire; Military orders: Knights Templar; Teutonic Order; Knights Hospitaller	Muslim forces: Ayyubid Sultanate	Defeat: Ayyubid victory	
1217	1274	Prussian Crusade	Crusaders: Teutonic Order; Order of Dobrin; Duchy of Masovia; Kingdom of Poland; Holy Roman Empire; Kingdom of Bohemia; Duchy of Silesia; Duchy of Brunswick-Lüneburg; Principality of Brunswick-Wolfenbüttel; Margraviate of Brandenburg; Margraviate of Meissen; Margraviate of Lusatia; Landgraviate of Thuringia; Duchy of Austria; Margraviate of Moravia; Duchy of Saxony; Principality of Anhalt; County of Mark; County of Jülich; Burgraviate of Magdeburg; County of Regenstein; County of Schwarzburg; County of Habsburg; Duchy of Pomerania (turned); Duchy of Pomerelia; Duchy of Gdańsk; Duchy of Świecie and Lubiszewo; Duchy of Lubiszewo; Kingdom of Galicia–Volhynia; Order of Calatrava; other guest crusaders, especially from the HRE	Baltic pagans: Prussians; Bartians; Galindians; Natangians; Nadruvians; Pomesanians; Pogesanians; Sambians; Warmians; Yotvingians (Sudovians); Skalvians; Allies of Prussians: Grand Duchy of Lithuania; Duchy of Pomerania	Victory: Teutonic Knights gain control of Prussia	
1241	1242	Mongol incursions in the Holy Roman Empire	Holy Roman Empire	Golden Horde	Victory	
15 June 1246	15 June 1246	Austrian-Hungarian War (1246–1254)	Duchy of Austria	Kingdom of Hungary	Victory	
July 1260	31 March 1261	War of Styria	Czech lands: Kingdom of Bohemia; Margraviate of Moravia; Duchy of Austria; Duchy of Styria; Duchy of Silesia; Duchy of Carinthia	Kingdom of Hungary; Kingdom of Croatia; Duchy of Kraków; Principality of Galicia–Volhynia	Victory: Peace of Vienna	
26 August 1278	26 August 1278	Habsburg–Přemyslid War	Kingdom of Hungary (including Cumans and Szeklers); Kingdom of Germany; Duchy of Austria; Burgraviate of Nuremberg; Mercenaries: Duchy of Swabia; Duchy of Styria; Duchy of Upper Bavaria	Czech lands: Kingdom of Bohemia; Margraviate of Moravia; Duchy of Głogów; Duchy of Lower Bavaria; Duchy of Silesia; Mercenaries: March of Brandenburg; Duchy of Styria; March of Meissen; Lesser Poland; Greater Poland	Victory	
1291	1474/1511	Swiss-Habsburg war	Holy Roman Empire	Old Swiss Confederacy	Defeat: Growth of the Old Swiss Confederacy; Shift of the center of power of the Habsburg possessions to the east, in Austria	
2 July 1298	2 July 1298	Battle of Göllheim	Duchy of Austria; Kingdom of Bohemia	County of Nassau; Electoral Palatinate	Victory	
31 May 1307	31 May 1307	Battle of Lucka	Holy Roman Empire	Margraviate of Meissen	Defeat	
9 November 1313	9 November 1313	Battle of Gammelsdorf	Duchy of Austria	Duchy of Bavaria	Defeat	
15 November 1315	15 November 1315	Battle of Morgarten	Duchy of Austria	Forest Cantons (Swiss Confederacy): Schwyz; Uri; Unterwalden	Defeat	
28 September 1322	28 September 1322	Battle of Mühldorf	Duchy of Austria; Duchy of Carinthia; Prince-Archbishopric of Salzburg; Bishopric of Passau	Duchy of (Upper) Bavaria; Kingdom of Bohemia; Burgraviate of Nuremberg	Defeat: Capture of Frederick of Habsburg	
9 July 1363	9 July 1369	Bavarian invasion of Tyrol (1363-1369)	Archbishopric of Salzburg	Duchy of (Upper) Bavaria Commune of Milan	Victory	
9 July 1386	9 July 1386	Battle of Sempach	Duchy of Austria	Old Swiss Confederacy: Lucerne; Uri; Schwyz; Unterwalden	Defeat	
9 April 1388	9 April 1388	Battle of Näfels	Duchy of Austria	Old Swiss Confederacy: Glarus; Uri; Schwyz	Defeat	
1401	1429	Appenzell Wars	Abbey of Saint Gall Diocese of Konstanz Diocese of Augsburg Counts of Toggenburg Knights of Saint George	Apenzell St. Gallen Canton of Schwyz	Stalemate: Apenzell joins Old Swiss Confederacy	
30 July 1419	30 May 1434	Hussite Wars	Crusaders and Catholic loyalists: Hungary-Croatia (Note: Hungary and Croatia were in a personal union. Sigismund of Luxembourg was the king of Hungary and at the same time the king of Croatia.): Cumans (Note: The Cumans (or Kumans) were a Turkic nation settled on Hungarian territory (Kunság), where were incorporated into Hungarian forces as mercenaries. During the invasion they were characterized by cruelty to civilians and increased plundering of villages.); Holy Roman Empire (also German Kingdom (Note: Sigismund of Luxembourg was crowned Holy Roman Emperor in 1433. Until that, he had invaded Bohemia as the king of Germany and the king of Hungary.)): Bohemian Crown; Landfrieden of Plzeň (Note: The Landfrieden of Plzeň remained the major power of the Bohemian loyalists and Catholicism of the entire Kingdom of Bohemia.); Bohemian Catholic nobility and cities; German Bohemians (Note: Hussitism spread especially among the Czech-speaking people, while the Bohemian Germans remained loyal to the Catholic Church and Emperor Sigismund. In some cases, German burghers took part in a defense of city during a Hussite siege. This seriously caused hostility between the Slavic Czechs and the German population of Bohemia.); Moravia; Olomouc; Silesian duchies; Oels; Nysa; Oława; Świdnica; Münsterberg; Żagań; Wrocław; Troppau; Upper Lusatia; Lower Lusatia; Egerland; Kladsko; Meissen (until 1423); Saxony (since 1423); Austria; Palatinate; Brandenburg; Bavaria-Landshut; Trier; Cologne; Mainz; Thuringia; Hesse; Würzburg; Brunswick-Lüneburg; Swabian cities; Free imperial cities (several participated); Various mercenaries and crusaders; Teutonic Order; Order of Rhodes; Papal States; England (Note: Participated in the Third anti-Hussite Crusade under the leadership of Henry Beaufort.); Serbia; Poland (Note: The Poles supported the Czech Hussites in their efforts, except when Hussitism spread to Poland. The Polish Hussites were defeated in the battle of Grotniki (1439).); Allies: Moderate Hussite faction (since 1423): Praguers; Bohemian Hussite nobility; Split taborite group: Radical Picards/Neo-Adamites (Note: Considered and persecuted by Hussites as heretics. Adam de Rohan, a famed Adamite leader involved against Jan Žižka, along with others, perhaps survived the wars and then lived in secret.)	Bohemia & Moravia: Hussite movement (Note: The Hussite movement was formed by pilgrims and followers in southern and western Bohemia, Plzeň and in the newly founded town of Tábor.)(1419–20); Hussite Bohemia (Note: The Kingdom of Bohemia under the Hussite movement was controlled by various Hussite unions (factions) led by hetmans (military commanders), the most strongest of which were Taborites, Praguers, Orebites (later Osphans), etc.) (1420–23): Taborites; Praguers (Note: The "Praguers" were a Hussite union in central Bohemia and centered in the capital city of Prague.); Orebites (Note: The Orebites were a Hussite union in Eastern Bohemia.); Union of Žatec and Louny (Note: The Hussites of Žatec and Louny were a union in Northern Bohemia.); Bohemian Hussite nobility and cities; Moravian Hussites: Moravian Hussite nobility; New Tábor (1420–21); Radical Hussite faction (1423–34): Taborites; Orebites (until 1424); Orphans (since 1424) (Note: The Orebites renamed themselves "Orphans" (Sirotci) after Žižka's death (1424).); Allies: Lithuania (Note: Lithuania supported the Hussite revolution in the hope of receiving the Bohemian royal crown for itself. For this purpose the Lithuanian duke Sigismund Korybut came to Bohemia and was designed by the Hussites as their additional hetman (military commander).); Supported by: Poland Polish–Hussite invasion of Prussia (1433): Poland; Pomerania-Stolp; Orphans as mercenaries Poland: Polish Hussites	Victory: Victory of the moderate Hussites (Utraquists or Calixtines) and Catholics over the radical Hussites: Compromise between moderate Hussites and the Catholic Church; both join forces to fight the radical Hussites; The moderate Hussites are recognized by the Catholic Church and allowed to practice their own rite; The radical Hussites are defeated, and their rites forbidden; Sigismund of Luxembourg becomes King of Bohemia; The Basel Compacts, signed by Emperor Sigismund and Catholic and Hussite representatives, effectively end the Hussite Wars	Battle of Waidhofen (1431)
2 November 1440	12 June 1446	Old Zürich War	Imperial City of Zurich; Habsburg Further Austria; France	Old Swiss Confederacy: Canton of Bern; Canton of Lucerne; Canton of Uri; Canton of Schwyz; Canton of Unterwalden; Canton of Glarus; Canton of Zug; Vogteien of Appenzell	Victory: Settled by the Peace of Einsiedeln, 13 July 1450, Zurich re-admitted to the Confederation; Southern Zurich littoral (March and Höfe) lost to Schwyz; Kyburg lost to the Habsburgs (until 1452)	

War of the Babenberg Succession:

- Battle of Kressenbrunn - 1260
- Battle on the Marchfeld - 1278

== Archduchy of Austria (1453–1804) ==
Start	Finish	Name of Conflict	Belligerents (excluding Austria, mentioned as a state of the Holy Roman Empire)		Outcome	Notable battles
Start	Finish	Name of Conflict	Allies	Enemies	Outcome	Notable battles
1458	1465	Inner Austrian War		Albert VI, Archduke of Austria; Kingdom of Bohemia	Victory	
4 March 1459	April 1462	Austrian–Hungarian War (1459–62)		Kingdom of Hungary	Defeat	
26 July 1468	27 August 1468	Waldshuter war		Old Swiss Confederacy	Defeat	
1 February 1469	October 1469	Baumkircher feud		Supporters of Andreas Baumkircher	Victory	
1474	5 January 1477	Burgundian Wars	Old Swiss Confederacy; Duchy of Lorraine; Upper Alsace	(Duchy of Burgundy) Burgundian State; Duchy of Savoy	Victory: Extinction of Valois Burgundy and division between Valois France and Habsburg heirs	
19 August 1477	23 December 1482	War of the Burgundian Succession	Burgundy-Habsburg: Burgundian State	Valois-Orléans: Kingdom of France	Defeat: Treaty of Arras (1482); France annexes several Burgundian territories, including the two Burgundies and Picardian counties.	
1477	1488	Austrian–Hungarian War (1477–88)	Holy Roman Empire	Kingdom of Hungary	Defeat: The Black Army captures Vienna	Siege of Hainburg – 1482; Battle of Leitzersdorf – 1484; Siege of Vienna (1485); Siege of Retz – 1486; Siege of Wiener Neustadt (1486 - 1487)
2 February 1478	1478	Carinthian Peasant Revolt	Austria	Carinthian Peasants League Ottoman Empire	Victory: Rebellion suppressed	
5 June 1483	June 1485	Flemish revolt of 1483–1485		Flemish rebels	Victory: Rebellion suppressed	
June 1486	22 July 1489	Mad War	Rebellious nobles: Lorraine; Brittany; Albret; Orange; Angoulême; Supported by: Holy Roman Empire; England; Castile	France	Defeat: Treaty of Frankfurt (1489)	
1487	1487	Battle of Calliano (1487)	(Holy Roman Empire) Bishopric of Trent (Holy Roman Empire) County of Tyrol	Republic of Venice	Victory	
November 1487	1492	Flemish revolt of 1487–1492			Victory	
1490	7 November 1491	Austrian–Hungarian War (1490–91)	Holy Roman Empire	Kingdom of Hungary	Victory: Peace of Pressburg (1491)	
1491	1492	Bread and Cheese Revolt		Bread and Cheese Folk	Victory	
1494	1495	Italian War of 1494–1495	1494: Kingdom of Naples 1495: League of Venice; Papal States; Republic of Venice; Kingdom of Naples; Kingdoms of Spain; Duchy of Milan; Holy Roman Empire; Republic of Florence England (1496–98); Margraviate of Mantua; Republic of Genoa	Kingdom of France: (Old Swiss Confederacy) Swiss mercenaries; Duchy of Milan (before 1495); Duchy of Ferrara (officially neutral)	Victory	
20 January 1499	22 September 1499	Swabian War	Swabian League Forces of the Holy Roman Empire	Old Swiss Confederacy Three Leagues of the Grisons	Defeat	Peace of Basel; Swiss Confederacy exempt from the resolutions of the Imperial Diet of Worms (1495); Battle of Hard - 1499; Battle of Frastanz - 1499
1502	1543	Guelders Wars	Habsburg Netherlands	Duchy of Guelders	Victory: The Duchy of Guelders is incorporated into the Seventeen Provinces	
1505	19 July 1506	Austrian–Hungarian War (1505–06)	Holy Roman Empire	Kingdom of Hungary	Victory: Treaty of Vienna (1506)	
February 1508	4 December 1516	War of the League of Cambrai	1508–1510: League of Cambrai: Papal States; France; Holy Roman Empire; Spain; Duchy of Ferrara; 1511–1513: Holy League: Papal States; Venice; Spain; Holy Roman Empire; England; (Old Swiss Confederacy) Swiss mercenaries; 1513–1516: Papal States; Spain; Holy Roman Empire; England; Duchy of Milan; (Old Swiss Confederacy) Swiss mercenaries	1508–1510: Venice; 1513–1516: Venice; France; Scotland; Duchy of Ferrara	Defeat	
1515	1515	Slovene peasant revolt of 1515		Slovenian rebels	Victory	
1515	1523	Arumer Zwarte Hoop	Habsburg Netherlands	Arumer Zwarte Hoop Charles II, Duke of Guelders	Victory	
1521	14 January 1526	Italian War of 1521–26	Holy Roman Empire; Spain; England; Papal States (1521–1523 and 1525–1526)	France: (Old Swiss Confederacy) Swiss mercenaries; Republic of Venice; Papal States (1524–1525); Marquisate of Saluzzo	Victory: Capture of Francis I of France at the Battle of Pavia; Treaty of Rome (1525) (Note: Francesco II Sforza restored to power in the Duchy of Milan under the protection of Emperor Charles V and Pope Clement VII, who abandons a temporary alliance with Francis I of France.); Treaty of Madrid (1526) (Note: Liberation of Francis I under the condition that France abandons its claims on the Imperial Duchy of Milan and cedes the Duchy of Burgundy to the House of Habsburg.)	
16 April 1520	25 October 1521	Revolt of the Comuneros	Royalist Castilians	Comuneros rebels	Victory	
1524	1525	German Peasants' War	Swabian League; partly: Landgraviate of Hesse; Principality of Brunswick-Wolfenbüttel; Electorate of Saxony	Peasants' army	Victory: Suppression of revolt and execution of its participants, as well as a major influence on the Anabaptist movement	
22 May 1526	10 August 1530	War of the League of Cognac	Pro-Habsburg: Holy Roman Empire; Spain; Duchy of Ferrara; Republic of Genoa (1528–1530); Duchy of Mantua (1528–1530); Papal States (1530)	League of Cognac: Kingdom of France; Swiss mercenaries; Papal States (1526–1529); Swiss Guards; Republic of Venice; Republic of Florence; Kingdom of England; Republic of Genoa (1526–1528); Kingdom of Navarre; Duchy of Milan	Victory: Treaty of Cambrai (1529); End of the Florentine Republic (1530); Transformation of Florence into a hereditary monarchy by Pope Clement VII (1532)	
17 December 1526	22 July 1533	Ottoman-Habsburg War (1526–1533)	Holy Roman Empire: Archduchy of Austria; Kingdom of Bohemia; Duchy of Styria; Duchy of Carniola; Royal Hungary; Kingdom of Croatia; Spanish Empire; Papal States	Ottoman Empire; John Szapolyai's Hungarian kingdom Kingdom of France	Defeat: Hungary was divided into larger Ottoman and smaller Habsburg spheres of influence, as well as a semi-independent Hungarian vassal state of Transylvania.	Siege of Vienna (1529); Battle of Leobersdorf (1532)
June 1535	June 1535	Conquest of Tunis (1535)	Spanish Empire: Kingdom of Naples; Kingdom of Sicily; Holy Roman Empire: County of Flanders; Kingdom of Portugal; Papal States; Republic of Genoa (Sovereign Military Order of Malta) Knights of Malta	Ottoman Empire	Victory: Muley Hassan of the Hafsid dynasty restored as client ruler of Tunis and Spanish-Imperial tributary.	
March 1536	18 June 1538	Italian War of 1536–38	Holy Roman Empire; Spain	Kingdom of France; Ottoman Empire	Defeat: Savoy and Piedmont acquired by France	
May 1536	19 June 1547	Ottoman-Habsburg War (1536–1547)	Holy Roman Empire: Archduchy of Austria; Kingdom of Bohemia; Duchy of Styria; Duchy of Carniola; Royal Hungary; Kingdom of Croatia; Spanish Empire; Papal States	Ottoman Empire; John Szapolyai's Hungarian kingdom Kingdom of France	Defeat: Truce of Adrianople (1547)	
October 1539	November 1540	Revolt of Ghent (1539–1540)	Holy Roman Empire	Ghent rebels	Victory	
October 1541	November 1541	Algiers expedition (1541)	Empire of Charles V: Holy Roman Empire; Spain; (Kingdom of Naples) Naples; Sicily; (Sovereign Military Order of Malta) Order of Saint John; Republic of Genoa; Papal States; Kingdom of Kuku	Regency of Algiers	Defeat	
12 July 1542	18 September 1544	Italian War of 1542–46	Holy Roman Empire; Spain; Kingdom of England	France Ottoman Empire; Jülich-Cleves-Berg	Inconclusive: Treaty of Crépy	
10 July 1546	23 May 1547	Schmalkaldic War	Empire of Charles V: Holy Roman Empire; Spain	Schmalkaldic League	Victory: Capitulation of Wittenberg	
January 1547	July 1547	The Estates Revolt in Bohemia in 1547	Empire of Charles V	Bohemian rebels	Victory	
1551	1559	Italian War of 1551–1559	Empire of Charles V: Holy Roman Empire; Spain; England	France Ottoman Empire	Victory	
1551	27 November 1562	Ottoman-Habsburg War (1551–1562)	Holy Roman Empire; Spain; Papal States	Ottoman Empire; France	Defeat: Treaty of Frankfurt (1562)	
1566	17 February 1568	Ottoman-Habsburg War (1566–1568)	Holy Roman Empire; Spain; Papal States	Ottoman Empire	Defeat: Treaty of Adrianople (1568)	
23 May 1568	30 January 1648	Eighty Years' War	Holy Roman Empire; Spain	United Provinces; Kingdom of France; England	Defeat: Peace of Münster: Independence of Netherlands from HRE.	
1573	1573	Croatian–Slovene Peasant Revolt	Kingdom of Croatia	Croatian and Slovenian rebels	Victory	
22 August 1587	9 March 1589	War of the Polish Succession (1587–88)	Supporters of Maximilian III, Archduke of Austria	Supporters of Sigismund III Vasa	Defeat: Treaty of Bytom and Będzin	
29 July 1593	11 November 1606	Long Turkish War: includes the Bocskai uprising	Holy Roman Empire; Transylvania; Wallachia; Moldavia; Zaporozhian Host; Spain; Serbian rebels Papal States; Venice; Saxony; Tuscany; Persia; Knights of St. Stephen; Bulgarian rebels Duchy of Ferrara; Duchy of Mantua; Duchy of Savoy	Ottoman Empire; Nogai Khanate	Inconclusive: Peace of Zsitvatorok	
10 June 1609	24 October 1610	War of the Jülich Succession	Holy Roman Empire; Principality of Strasbourg; Prince-Bishopric of Liège; Catholic League Spain	Margraviate of Brandenburg; Palatinate-Neuburg; United Provinces; Kingdom of France; Protestant Union	Defeat: Treaty of Xanten	
July 1612	September 1614	Rappenkrieg		Peasant rebels	Victory: Rebellion suppressed	
January 1616	26 September 1617	Uskok War	Holy Roman Empire Spain	Republic of Venice Dutch Republic; England	Defeat: Treaty of Madrid (1617)	
23 May 1618	24 October 1648	Thirty Years' War: includes the War of the Mantuan Succession, Bohemian Revolt and Palatinate campaign	Holy Roman Empire: Catholic League; Bavaria; Spain and its possessions Denmark-Norway (1643–1645)	Sweden France; Bohemia; Denmark-Norway (1625–1629); Saxony; United Provinces; Electorate of the Palatinate; Brunswick-Lüneburg; England; Scotland; Brandenburg-Prussia; Transylvania; Hungarian Anti-Habsburg Rebels; Ottoman Empire	Peace of Westphalia	
1620	1644	Vlach uprisings in Moravia	Holy Roman Empire	Moravian Wallachia	Victory	
May 1626	December 1626	Upper Austrian peasant war of 1626	Bavaria	Austrian Rebels	Victory: Rebellion suppressed	
1626	1629	Polish–Swedish War (1626–1629)	Poland-Lithuania Holy Roman Empire	(Sweden) Swedish Empire	Defeat: Truce of Altmark	
27 May 1657	3 May 1660	Second Northern War	Poland (Poland–Lithuania); Denmark–Norway; Russia (1656–58); Crimean Khanate; Brandenburg-Prussia (1655–56, 1657–60); Dutch Republic	(Sweden) Swedish Empire; Brandenburg-Prussia (1656–57); Principality of Transylvania; Ukrainian Cossacks (1657); Grand Duchy of Lithuania; Wallachia; Moldavia	Inconclusive: Treaty of Oliva	
12 April 1663	10 August 1664	Austro-Turkish War (1663–1664)	Holy Roman Empire; League of the Rhine	Ottoman Empire	Austrian military victory Ottoman diplomatic and commercial victory: Peace of Vasvár	
1665	1666	Varaždin rebellion		Serbo-Croatian rebels from Slavonian Military Frontier	Victory: Rebellion suppressed	
1 July 1673	26 January 1679	Franco-Dutch War	Dutch Republic; Holy Roman Empire: Brandenburg-Prussia; Spain; Denmark-Norway; England (1678)	France; England (1672–74); Sweden; Münster; Cologne	Defeat: Treaties of Nijmegen	
1680	1680	Peasant Uprising		Czech Peasants	Victory: Rebellion suppressed	
1683	15 August 1684	War of the Reunions	Holy Roman Empire; Spain; Republic of Genoa	Kingdom of France	Defeat: Truce of Ratisbon	
14 July 1683	26 January 1699	Great Turkish War	Holy Roman Empire; Tsardom of Russia; Cossack Hetmanate; Polish–Lithuanian Commonwealth; Republic of Venice; Albanian rebels Serb rebels Greek rebels Spain	Ottoman Empire; Crimean Khanate	Victory: Treaty of Karlowitz	Battle of Vienna (1683)
27 September 1688	20 September 1697	Nine Years' War	Grand Alliance: Dutch Republic; England; Holy Roman Empire; Spain; Piedmont-Savoy; Sweden (until 1691); Scotland	France; Irish Jacobites	Inconclusive: Treaty of Ryswick	
9 July 1701	7 March 1714	War of the Spanish Succession: includes the Rákóczi's War of Independence and Bavarian uprising of 1705–1706	Spain loyal to Archduke Charles; England; Great Britain; Dutch Republic; Duchy of Savoy; Prussia; Kingdom of Portugal	Spain loyal to Philip V of Spain; Kingdom of France; Electorate of Bavaria; Kurucs (Kingdom of Hungary); Principality of Transylvania	Phillip V confirmed as King of Spain Habsburg territorial gains: Treaty of Rastatt; Austria successfully crushes revolutions in Hungary and Bavaria	Battle of Saint Gotthard (1705)
13 April 1716	21 July 1718	Austro-Turkish War of 1716–1718	Republic of Venice	Ottoman Empire	Victory: Treaty of Passarowitz	
2 August 1718	17 February 1720	War of the Quadruple Alliance	Great Britain; France; Holy Roman Empire; Dutch Republic; Savoy	Spain	Victory: Treaty of The Hague (1720)	
10 October 1733	3 October 1735	War of the Polish Succession	Poland loyal to Augustus III Russian Empire; Holy Roman Empire: Saxony; Prussia	Poland loyal to Stanisław I France; Spain; Kingdom of Sardinia; Duchy of Parma	Augustus III confirmed as King of Poland: Treaty of Vienna; Duchy of Lorraine ceded to Stanisław I; Naples and Sicily ceded to Spain; Compensated with gain of Duchy of Parma	
12 July 1737	18 September 1739	Russo-Austrian-Turkish War (1735–1739)	Russian Empire	Ottoman Empire	Defeat: Treaty of Belgrade	
16 December 1740	18 October 1748	War of the Austrian Succession: includes the First Silesian War and the Second Silesian War.	Great Britain (Province of Hanover) Hanover; Dutch Republic; Saxony (1743–45); Kingdom of Sardinia (1742–48); Russia (1741–43) (1748)	Kingdom of Prussia (1740–42) (1744–45); Kingdom of Spain (1740–1746); Kingdom of France; Bavaria (1741–45); Saxony (1741–42) (Kingdom of the Two Sicilies) Naples and Sicily; Republic of Genoa; Sweden (1741–43); Kingdom of Sardinia (1741–42)	Mixed results Austrian defensive victory overall: Pragmatic Sanction recognized, Maria Theresia keeps the Austrian throne and a potential Austrian partition is avoided Austrian defeat in Silesian Wars against Prussia: Habsburg territorial losses: Treaty of Aix-la-Chapelle (1748)	Battle of Schärding (1742); Capitulation of Linz (1742)
29 August 1756	15 February 1763	Seven Years' War: includes the Third Silesian War.	France; Russia; Spain; Sweden; Saxony	Prussia; Great Britain (Province of Hanover) Hanover; Brunswick-Wolfenbüttel; Kingdom of Portugal; Hesse-Kassel; Schaumburg-Lippe; Iroquois Confederacy	Military stalemate Status quo ante bellum in Europe: Treaty of Hubertusburg	
1774	1774	Revolt of Horea, Cloșca and Crișan		Romanian peasants	Victory: Revolution suppressed	
July 1778	13 May 1779	War of the Bavarian Succession		Kingdom of Prussia; Electorate of Saxony; Bavaria	Inconclusive: Treaty of Teschen	
8 October 1784	8 October 1784	Kettle War		Dutch Republic	Inconclusive	
18 August 1789	12 January 1791	Liège Revolution	Prince-Bishopric of Liège	Republic of Liège; United Belgian States; Kingdom of Prussia	Victory: Revolution suppressed	
24 October 1789	3 December 1790	Brabant Revolution		United Belgian States; Republic of Liège; Kingdom of Prussia	Victory: Revolution suppressed	
February 1788	4 August 1791	Austro-Turkish War (1788–1791)	Russian Empire	Ottoman Empire	Victory: Treaty of Sistova	
20 April 1792	18 April 1797	War of the First Coalition	Holy Roman Empire; Prussia; Great Britain (Kingdom of France) French Royalists; Spain (1793–95); Portugal; Sardinia (Kingdom of the Two Sicilies) Naples and Sicily; Other Italian states Ottoman Empire; Dutch Republic	(France) French Republic; Spain (1796–97)	Defeat: Treaty of Leoben; Treaty of Campo Formio	
June 1794	November 1794	Kościuszko Uprising	Russian Empire; Prussia	Polish forces	Victory: Third Partition of Poland	
26 June 1797	July 1797	Denisko uprising		Polish rebels	Victory: Rebellion suppressed	
12 March 1799	9 February 1801	War of the Second Coalition	Russian Empire Great Britain (Kingdom of France) French Royalists; Portugal; Two Sicilies; Ottoman Empire	(France) French Republic Spain; Denmark-Norway	Defeat: Treaty of Lunéville	

For 1792–1815 Coalition Wars: See

- List of battles of the War of the Second Coalition (1798/9 – 1801/2); see Battle of Feldkirch
- List of battles of the War of the Third Coalition (1803/1805–1805/1806); see "Front: Austria"
- List of battles of the War of the Fifth Coalition (10 April – 14 October 1809); see "Front: Austria"
- List of battles of the War of the Sixth Coalition (3 March 1813 – 30 May 1814); see Battle of Feistritz

== Austrian Empire (1804–1867) ==
Start	Finish	Name of Conflict	Belligerents (excluding the Austrian Empire)		Outcome	Emperor	Casualties	Notable battles
Start	Finish	Name of Conflict	Allies	Enemies	Outcome	Emperor	Casualties	Notable battles
9 August 1805	26 December 1805	War of the Third Coalition	United Kingdom; Russian Empire (Kingdom of the Two Sicilies) Kingdom of Sicily (Kingdom of the Two Sicilies) Kingdom of Naples; Portugal; Sweden	(France) First French Empire; Spain	Defeat: Peace of Pressburg	Francis I	90,000 casualties	
3 April 1807	14 April 1807	Tican's rebellion		Serbian rebels	Victory: Rebellion suppressed	Francis I	? casualties	
12 July 1808	12 July 1808	Kruščica rebellion		Serbian rebels Romanian rebels	Victory: Rebellion suppressed	Francis I		
10 April 1809	14 October 1809	War of the Fifth Coalition: includes the Austro-Polish War, Tyrolean Rebellion and 1809 Gottscheer Rebellion	United Kingdom (Kingdom of the Two Sicilies) Sicily; Sardinia; Black Brunswickers	(France) First French Empire French client states	Defeat: Treaty of Schönbrunn	Francis I	170,000 casualties	
24 June 1812	30 January 1813	French invasion of Russia	(France) First French Empire; Prussia	Russia; United Kingdom; Sweden	Austria joins the Coalition: Truce of Pläswitz	Francis I	? casualties	
15 August 1813	11 April 1814	War of the Sixth Coalition	Russia; Prussia; United Kingdom; Sweden; Spain; Portugal (Kingdom of the Two Sicilies) Sicily; Sardinia	(France) First French Empire French client states	Victory: Treaty of Fontainebleau (1814); Congress of Vienna	Francis I	Unknown total casualties, 15,000 Austrian casualties at the Battle of Leipzig	
20 March 1815	8 July 1815	War of the Seventh Coalition: includes the Neapolitan War	Seventh Coalition: Russian Empire; Prussia; United Kingdom (Province of Hanover) Hanover; Nassau; Brunswick; Sweden; United Netherlands; Spain; Portugal; Sardinia (Kingdom of the Two Sicilies) Sicily; Tuscany; Switzerland (Kingdom of France) French Royalists	(France) First French Empire (Kingdom of the Two Sicilies) Naples	Victory: Treaty of Paris (1815); Treaty of Casalanza	Francis I	5,000 casualties	
1820	1821	Carbonari uprisings of 1820–1821: includes the Battle of Rieti		Carbonari	Victory	Francis I	? casualties	
February 1821	August 1821	Wallachian uprising of 1821	Ottoman Empire: Danubian Sich; Arnauts; Austrian Empire: (Ottoman Empire) Moldavian insurgents	Wallachia (revolutionary): (Wallachia) Wallachian Divan (conservative); Arnauts; Greek revolutionaries: Filiki Eteria; Sacred Band; Arnauts	Stalemate: End of Phanariots era	Francis I		
3 June 1829	2 February 1830	Austrian expedition against Morocco (1829)		Morocco	Victory • Austrian ship returned to Austria	Francis I	36 casualties	
1831	1831	1831 Italian insurrections		Duchy of Modena and Reggio Duchy of Parma Papal States	Victory	Francis I	? casualties	
1839	1841	Second Egyptian-Ottoman War: includes the Oriental Crisis of 1840	Ottoman Empire (United Kingdom) British Empire Russian Empire Prussia	Egypt (France) Kingdom of the French (Spain) Spanish Empire	Victory: Convention of London (1840)	Ferdinand I of Austria	? casualties	
20 February 1846	4 March 1846	Kraków uprising	Russian Empire	Polish independence movement	Victory	Ferdinand I of Austria	? casualties	
15 March 1848	13 August 1849	Revolutions of 1848 in the Austrian Empire: Hungarian Revolution of 1848; Prague Uprising of 1848; Slovak Uprising of 1848–49; Serb uprising of 1848–49	Austrian Empire: Kingdom of Hungary; Kingdom of Croatia; Kingdom of Bohemia; Kingdom of Lombardy–Venetia; Kingdom of Galicia and Lodomeria; Russian Empire: Grand Duchy of Finland	Revolutionaries: German Empire; Hungarian State; Republic of San Marco; Provisional Government of Milan; (Poland) Polish National Committee; Romanians in Transylvania; Supreme Ruthenian Council; Prague Slavic Congress; Slovak National Council; Serbian Vojvodina	Victory: Surrender at Világos	Francis Joseph I	Heavy but unknown total casualties	Battle of Schwechat (1848)
23 March 1848	22 August 1849	First Italian War of Independence	(France) Second French Republic (since 1849) Papal States (since 1849)	Kingdom of Sardinia (Tuscany) Grand Duchy of Tuscany; Briefly allied with: Papal States (until 1848); Kingdom of the Two Sicilies	Victory	Francis Joseph I	15,580 casualties	
12 January 1848	27 October 1848	Revolutions of 1848 in the Italian states	Papal States; Kingdom of the Two Sicilies Tuscany	Kingdom of Sicily Provisional Government of Milan Republic of San Marco Roman Republic Supported by: Kingdom of Sardinia	Victory	Francis Joseph I		
29 April 1859	11 July 1859	Second Italian War of Independence		Kingdom of Sardinia (France) Second French Empire	Defeat: Armistice of Villafranca	Francis Joseph I	12,568 deaths, total casualties unknown	
8 December 1861	21 June 1867	Second French intervention in Mexico	France; Mexican Empire; Supported by: Spain (1861–1862); United Kingdom (1861–1862); Austria; Belgium; Egypt (including Sudanese slave soldiers); Polish exiles	Mexico; Supported by: United States (1865–1867)	Defeat: Death of Maximilian I of Mexico	Francis Joseph I		
1 February 1864	30 October 1864	Second Schleswig War	Prussia	Denmark	Victory: Treaty of Vienna (1864)	Francis Joseph I	1,000 casualties	
14 June 1866	23 August 1866	Austro-Prussian War: includes the Third Italian War of Independence	German Confederation: Saxony; Bavaria; Baden; Württemberg; Hanover; Hesse-Darmstadt; Hesse-Kassel; Reuss Elder Line; Saxe-Meiningen; Schaumburg-Lippe; Nassau; Free City of Frankfurt	Prussia Italy; Mecklenburg-Schwerin; Mecklenburg-Strelitz; Oldenburg; Anhalt; Brunswick; Saxe-Altenburg; Saxe-Coburg and Gotha; Lippe; Schwarzburg; Waldeck; Bremen; Hamburg; Lübeck	Defeat: Peace of Prague (1866)	Francis Joseph I	106,796 casualties	

== Austro-Hungarian Empire (1867–1918) ==
Start	Finish	Name of Conflict	Belligerents (excluding the Austro-Hungarian Empire)		Outcome	Emperor	Casualties
Start	Finish	Name of Conflict	Allies	Enemies	Outcome	Emperor	Casualties
19 June 1875	20 October 1878	Great Eastern Crisis: Occupation of Bosnia and Herzegovina	Russia: Grand Duchy of Finland; Romania Bulgaria Montenegro Serbia Austria-Hungary: Greek rebels; Supported by: Germany France	Ottoman Empire: Bosnia vilayet; Egypt; Supported by: United Kingdom	Victory: Treaty of Berlin (1878); Austro-Hungarian rule in Bosnia and Herzegovina		7,447 casualties
1879	1880	Uprising of Sheikh Ubeydullah	Ottoman Empire Persia	Kurdish tribes	Victory: Austro-Hungarian military mission in Persia help success in crush the rebellion.		
14 November 1885	28 November 1885	Serbo-Bulgarian War	Serbia Support: Austria-Hungary Russian Empire	Bulgaria	Defeat: Bulgarian unification	Francis Joseph I (1867–1916), Charles I of Austria (1916–1918)	
January 1897	October 1898	Cretan Revolt of 1897-1898	Cretan revolutionaries Kingdom of Greece International Squadron: United Kingdom; France (Kingdom of Italy) Italy; Russian Empire; Austria-Hungary (until March 1898); German Empire (until November 1897)	Ottoman Empire	Victory: Ottoman withdrawal from Crete; Establishment of the Cretan State	Francis Joseph I (1867–1916), Charles I of Austria (1916–1918)	Unknown
2 November 1899	7 September 1901	Boxer Rebellion	Eight-Nation Alliance: Japan; Russia; United Kingdom; France; United States; Germany; Italy	Righteous Harmony Society Qing Empire	Victory	Francis Joseph I (1867–1916), Charles I of Austria (1916–1918)	Unknown but very light casualties
28 July 1914	3 November 1918	World War I	Central Powers Germany; Austria-Hungary; Ottoman Empire; Bulgaria (1915–18)	Allies: France; British Empire; Russia (1914–17); Italy; United States (1917–18); Serbia and others	Defeat, the Austro-Hungarian Empire is dissolved.: Paris Peace Conference, 1919; Treaty of Saint-Germain-en-Laye (1919)	Francis Joseph I (1867–1916), Charles I of Austria (1916–1918)	1,200,000 to 1,494,200 deaths
28 October 1918	31 October 1918	Aster Revolution	Austria-Hungary	Hungarian National Council: Hungarian Social Democratic Party	Defeat, Austro-Hungarian Compromise is abolished.: Start of Revolutions and interventions in Hungary (1918–1920)		
1 November 1918	1 November 1918	November Uprising (Lviv, 1918)	Austria-Hungary	West Ukrainian People's Republic	Defeat, Inclusion of Lemberg into the Ukrainian State.: Start of the Polish-Ukrainian War		

== Republic of German-Austria (1918–1919) ==
Start	Finish	Name of Conflict	Belligerents (excluding German-Austria)		Outcome	Chancellor	Casualties
Start	Finish	Name of Conflict	Allies	Enemies	Outcome	Chancellor	Casualties
23 November 1918	31 July 1919	Austro-Slovene conflict in Carinthia		State of Slovenes, Croats and Serbs (before unification) Kingdom of Serbs, Croats and Slovenes (after unification)	Ceasefire: In Carinthian plebiscite southeastern Carinthia votes in favour of joining Austria.; Territorial changes are coordinated by Treaty of Saint-Germain-en-Laye.; Majority of southeastern Carinthia is ceded to Austria.; Meža Valley and Jezersko are ceded to Kingdom of Serbs, Croats and Slovenes.	Karl Renner	1,000 casualties

== First Austrian Republic (1919–1934) ==
Start	Finish	Name of Conflict	Belligerents (excluding Austria)		Outcome	Chancellor	Casualties
Start	Finish	Name of Conflict	Allies	Enemies	Outcome	Chancellor	Casualties
28 August 1921	13 October 1921	Uprising in West Hungary	Austria; Hungary (disarmament of the rebels in 1922); Czechoslovakia (small border conflicts) (French Third Republic) France (Non-combatant military mission): French Algeria	Rongyos Gárda; Lajtabánság; Bosnian and Albanian Muslim volunteers	Hungarian victory, referendum called, Sopron and its area remained in Hungary	Johannes Schober	12 killed
12 February 1934	15 February 1934	Austrian Civil War	First Austrian Republic: Fatherland Front; Federal Army; Federal Police; Federal Gendarmerie; Heimwehr; Ostmärkische Sturmscharen	SDAPÖ: Republikanischer Schutzbund	Fatherland Front victory: Demise of multi-party system; Establishment of the Federal State of Austria	Engelbert Dollfuß	Thousands of casualties

== Federal State of Austria (1934–1938) ==
Start	Finish	Name of Conflict	Belligerents (excluding Austria)		Outcome	Chancellor	Casualties
Start	Finish	Name of Conflict	Allies	Enemies	Outcome	Chancellor	Casualties
25 July 1934	30 July 1934	July Putsch	VF: Federal Army; Police; Gendarmerie; Heimwehr	Schutzstaffel (SS): SS Standarte 89; (Nazi Germany) Austrian Nazi Party	Government victory: Nazi coup d'état failed; Fatherland Front remains in power; Chancellor Engelbert Dollfuss is killed	† Engelbert Dollfuß (assassinated), Kurt Schuschnigg after the assassination	200+ killed on both sides (including Engelbert Dollfuß)

== Ostmark Reichsgau of Nazi Germany ==
Start	Finish	Name of Conflict	Belligerents (excluding Austria)		Outcome	Chancellor	Casualties
Start	Finish	Name of Conflict	Allies	Enemies	Outcome	Chancellor	Casualties
12 March 1938	8 May 1945	Austrian resistance	Nazi Germany	Austrian resistance: (Austrian Empire) Catholic-monarchist resistance; Social-democrats and liberal resistance; Communist Party of Austria; Supported by: Carinthian Slovenes (Yugoslav Partisans) Bavarian monarchists United Kingdom Soviet Union Vatican City	Moscow Declarations seizured Austrian independence, but Otto von Habsburg didn't reign Austria.	Adolf Hitler	?
17 September 1938	16 March 1939	Undeclared German–Czechoslovak War: Invasion of Czechoslovakia (1939)	Nazi Germany (Kingdom of Hungary) Hungary (Second Polish Republic) Poland	Czechoslovakia	Munich Agreement and First Vienna Award: Occupation of Czechoslovakia (1938–1945) and establishment of the Protectorate of Bohemia and Moravia.; Territorial gains for Hungary and Poland.	Adolf Hitler	22 killed
1 September 1939	8 May 1945	World War II: European theatre of World War II; Bombing of Vienna in World War II; Vienna offensive; Battle of Castle Itter; Mediterranean and Middle East theatre of World War II	Axis Nazi Germany (Kingdom of Italy) Fascist Italy (Empire of Japan) Japanese empire (Kingdom of Hungary) Hungary Slovakia Croatia Finland (until 1944) Romania (until 1944) Bulgaria (until 1944)	Allies United Kingdom; France; United States; Soviet Union (Second Polish Republic) Poland; Czechoslovakia; Netherlands; Belgium (Kingdom of Yugoslavia) Yugoslavia; Greece; Finland (since 1944); Romania (since 1944); Bulgaria (since 1944) (Austria) Austrian resistance	End of German Anschluss and Allied occupation of Austria.	Adolf Hitler	70–85 million people death

== See also ==
- History of Austria
- Austrian Armed Forces
- Military history of Austria
- Category:Wars involving the Holy Roman Empire
- Archduke Franz Ferdinand of Austria
- Adolf Hitler
