= Wiener Neustadt (disambiguation) =

Wiener Neustadt is a city located south of Vienna.

== Other articles ==
- Wiener Neustadt East Airport
- Wiener Neustadt West Airport
- Wiener Neustadt Canal
- Wiener Neustadt Hauptbahnhof
- Wiener Neustadt Island
- Wiener Neustadt-Land District
- Wiener Neustädter Lokomotivfabrik
- Bombing of Wiener Neustadt in World War II
- Burg Wiener Neustadt
- Diocese of Wiener Neustadt
- Peace Treaty of Wiener Neustadt
- SC Wiener Neustadt
- Siege of Wiener Neustadt
- Stadion Wiener Neustadt
- University of Applied Sciences Wiener Neustadt
