= Battle of Zagreb (1491) =

- Part of the War of the Hungarian Succession
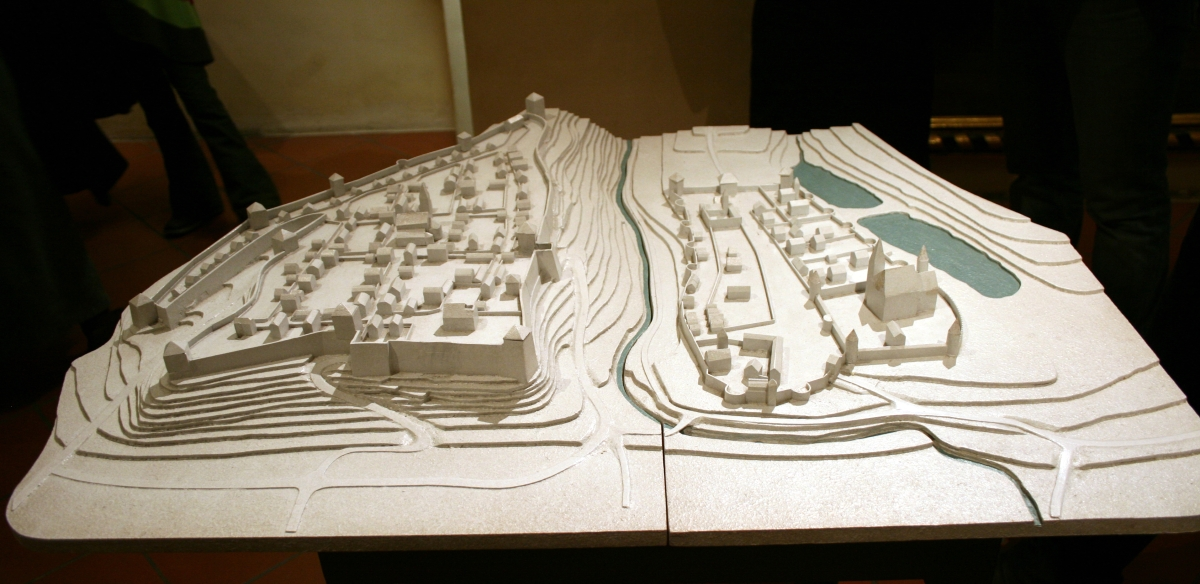
- A model of medieval Zagreb.
Date	July 1491
Location	Kaptol, Kingdom of Slavonia, Kingdom of Hungary
Result	Jagiellon victory

Belligerents
Kingdom of Hungary	Habsburg Monarchy

Commanders and leaders
John Corvinus; Ladislaus of Egervár	Colonel Benedikt (town garrison); Jakov Sekelj (relief army); Reinpreht Revhemburger (relief army)

Strength
Unknown	600 men (town garrison); 4,000 men (relief army)

Casualties and losses
Unknown	4,000 men captured by the enemy

Battle of Zagreb happened in summer 1491, during the course of War of the Hungarian Succession between forces loyal to king Vladislaus II Jagiellon and forces of Maximilian Habsburg. It ended by victory of pro-Jagiellon forces.

== Background ==
After Hungarian king Mathias Corvinus died in 1490, a kingdom plummeted in a civil war fought between Maximilian Habsburg and Vladislaus II Jagiellon. Habsburg armies soon made a thrust into Hungarian territory and captured important Hungarian cities such as Buda and Székesfehérvár. As Maximilian Habsburg also aspired to take Slavonia, his army reached Zagreb. While Gradec with numerous Croatian nobles already for some time recognised Maximilian as their king, neighbouring seat of Zagreb bishop - Kaptol - sided with anti-king Vladislaus II Jagiellon. In 1490 Habsburg army reached Zagreb, captured Kaptol, along with two castles in possession of bishop Osvald Tuz. Germans manned Kaptol with 600 soldiers, and harassed local populace.

== Battle ==
In 1491, John Corvinus was given a task of driving German Habsburg armies away from medieval Slavonia. As he went there in July 1491, he was joined by Ladislav of Egervar. Meanwhile, Kaptol, a bishopic part of Zagreb was manned by 600 strong German garrison led by certain colonel Benedikt. Hungarians besieged Kaptol, but could not capture it, since they had no cannons at their disposal. On the other hand, German garrison was also could not do much alone, but invested their hopes in possible relief army coming to their aid. Maximilian Habsburg did indeed send 4000 strong relief army commanded by Jakov Sekelj and Reinpreht Revhemburger to defeat Hungarians and therefore lift the siege.

In decisive moment a battle between Habsburg relief army and that of ban Ladislaus and herzeg Corvinus erupted, in which Germans ended up defeated and their army routed. A day after this victory, John Corvinus ordered his army an all-out charge on Kaptol. German garrison at Kaptol initially offered fierce resistance, but after realising that their resistance was futile, offered a surrender to John Corvinus which included a surrender of all their cannons to John Corvinus.

== Aftermath ==
According to a letter written by bishop Tamás Bakócz to bishop of Erdely, a victory scored by Ladislaus of Egervar ended up with "4000 Germans" taken in captivity.
