= Wiener Neustadt East Airport =

Wiener Neustadt East Airport Flugplatz Wiener Neustadt/Ost
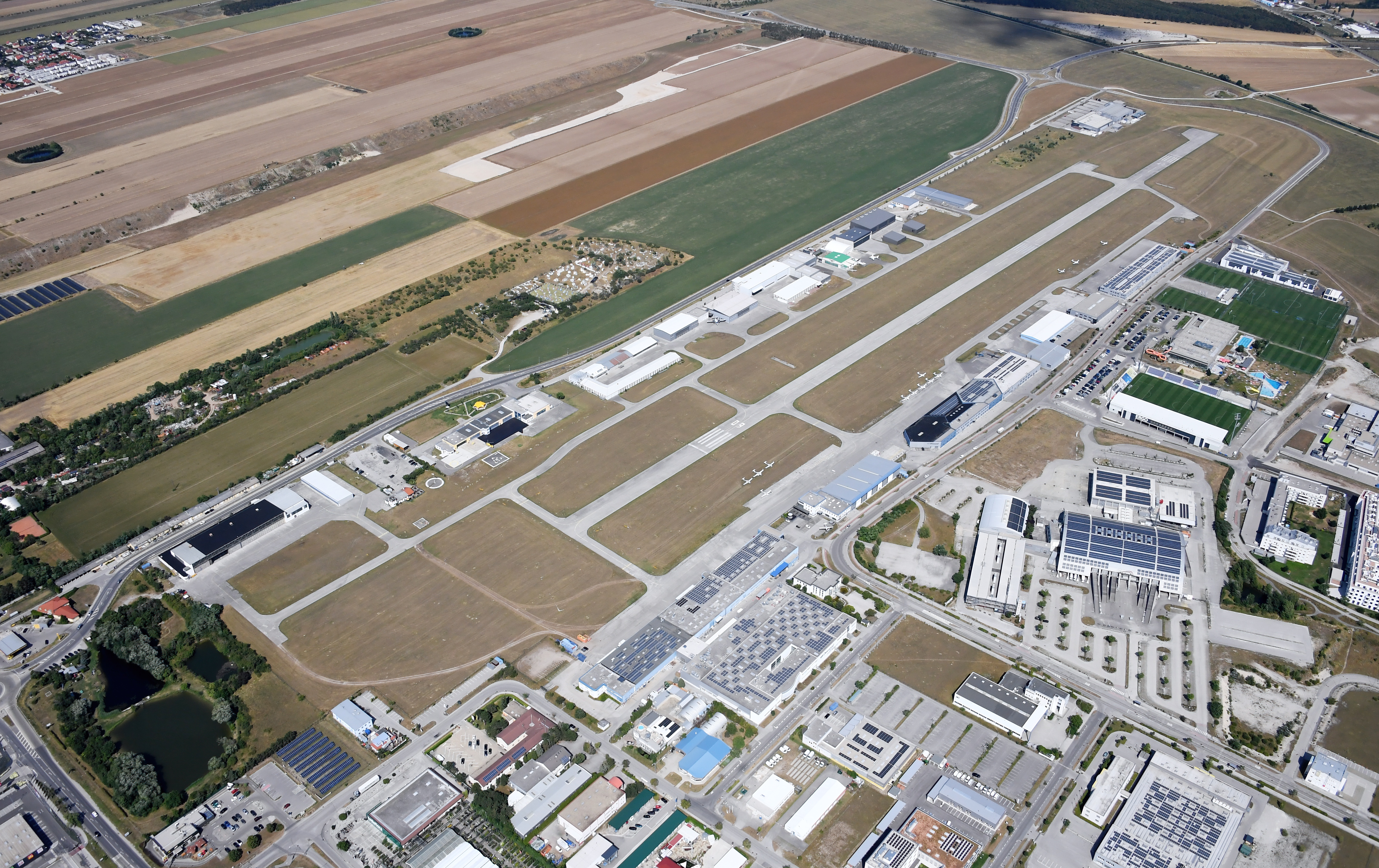
- IATA: None; ICAO: LOAN

Summary
- Airport type: Public
- Operator: Diamond SFCA
- Serves: Wiener Neustadt, Austria
- Opened: 1915
- Elevation AMSL: 896 ft / 273 m
- Coordinates: 47°50′36″N 016°15′36″E
- Website: loan-airport.at
- Interactive map of Wiener Neustadt East Airport

Runways
Direction	Length		Surface
Direction	m	ft	Surface
09/27	1,067	3,500	Asphalt
- Source: DAFIF

Wiener Neustadt East Airport (German: Flugplatz Wiener Neustadt/Ost) (IATA: None, ICAO: LOAN) is an airport serving Wiener Neustadt, a city in the Austrian state of Lower Austria. It is used for business and general aviation but doesn't feature commercial scheduled services; the nearest major airport is Vienna International Airport. In the 1990s, Tyrolean operated scheduled flights with a Dash 7 in and out of Wiener Neustadt Airport. The airport is home to Diamond Aircraft Industries

== Location ==
Wiener Neustadt East Airport is located northeast of the city of Wiener Neustadt and south of Theresienfeld. The next larger commercial airport is Vienna International Airport which is located about 60 km north of Wiener Neustadt. Wiener Neustadt East Airport is the second largest airport in the city of Wiener Neustadt. The largest is Wiener Neustadt West Airport which is a military airport.

== History ==
In 1915 the Österreichische Flugzeugfabrik (ÖFFAG) opened Wiener Neustadt Airport as their factory airfield. During World War II, the airfield was used for military purposes. The airfield was closed until 1972 when the Sport Flieger Club Austria (SFCA) rented the airfield to continue its operations. The SFCA overhauled and rebuilt the airport. The airport had four grass runways until the SFCA decided to build an asphalt runway, which is still in use today. One year later Diamond Aircraft, Austria's most famous aircraft factory, located their headquarters and factories at Wiener Neustadt Airport. In 1998 Diamond Aircraft Industries bought 51% of the airfield and the Diamond SFCA Ges.m.b.H. was created to manage all operations of the airport. Wiener Neustadt East Airport is one of the oldest airports in Europe.

== Airlines and destinations ==
As of January 2025, there are no scheduled services operated at the airport.

== Facilities ==
The airport has two aprons which are approved for commercial operations. Mostly the southern apron is used by business jets, while the north apron is used for general aviation and formerly for commercial operations. For passengers there are two restaurants. Smaller shops and a small mall are nearby.

== See also ==
- Wiener Neustadt West Airport
- Transport in Austria
- List of airports in Austria
