= Siege of Wiener Neustadt =

- Part of Austrian–Hungarian War (1477–1488)
Date	13 January 1486 – 17 August 1487
Location	Wiener Neustadt, Lower Austria 47°49′00″N 16°15′00″E
Result	Hungarian victory
Territorial changes	Austria ceded the western lands of Lower Austria, Styria and Carinthia to the Kingdom of Hungary

Belligerents
Holy Roman Empire; Electorate of Saxony	Kingdom of Hungary	Order of Saint George of Carinthia

Commanders and leaders
Hanns von Wulfestorff; Johann von Königsberg; Klemens Bachlek; Gandolf von Khünburg; Bernard von Westernacher; Hugo von Grafeneck; Ruprecht von Reichenberg Albert the Bold	Matthias Corvinus; Emeric Zápolya; Wilhelm Tettauer; Bartholomew Drágffy of Beltiug; Jacob Szekler; Ladislaus Kanizsay; Peter Geréb of Vingard; Matthias Geréb of Vingard; Stephen V Báthory	Johann Siebenhirter

Units involved
Imperial Army; Saxon Army	Black Army of Hungary	Knights of St. George

Strength
Reinforcements of Johann von Königsberg: 300 cavalry Reinforcements of Ruprecht von Reichenberg: 1,800 cavalry 200 foot soldiers 3,000 Saxon men-at-arms	8,000 foot soldiers 20,000 cavalry 1,000 Transylvanian cavalry 9,000 war wagons	Unknown

Casualties and losses
Unknown	500+100 dead 100 injured	Unknown
- The military forces of the Order of Saint George of Carinthia started as an ally of the Holy Roman Empire but remained neutral.
- Location within Austria Siege of Wiener Neustadt (Central Europe)

The siege of Wiener Neustad, part of the Austrian–Hungarian War, was an assault from January 1486 to August 1487 on the Austrian town of Wiener Neustadt. Launched by Matthias Corvinus, King of Hungary, the 18-month siege ended with the town's surrender and allowed Hungary to take control of the surrounding regions of Styria and Lower Austria. It was the last of a series of sieges, and followed Hungary's victory in the 1485 Siege of Vienna. The broader war ended less than a year later with an armistice in 1488.

== Premise ==
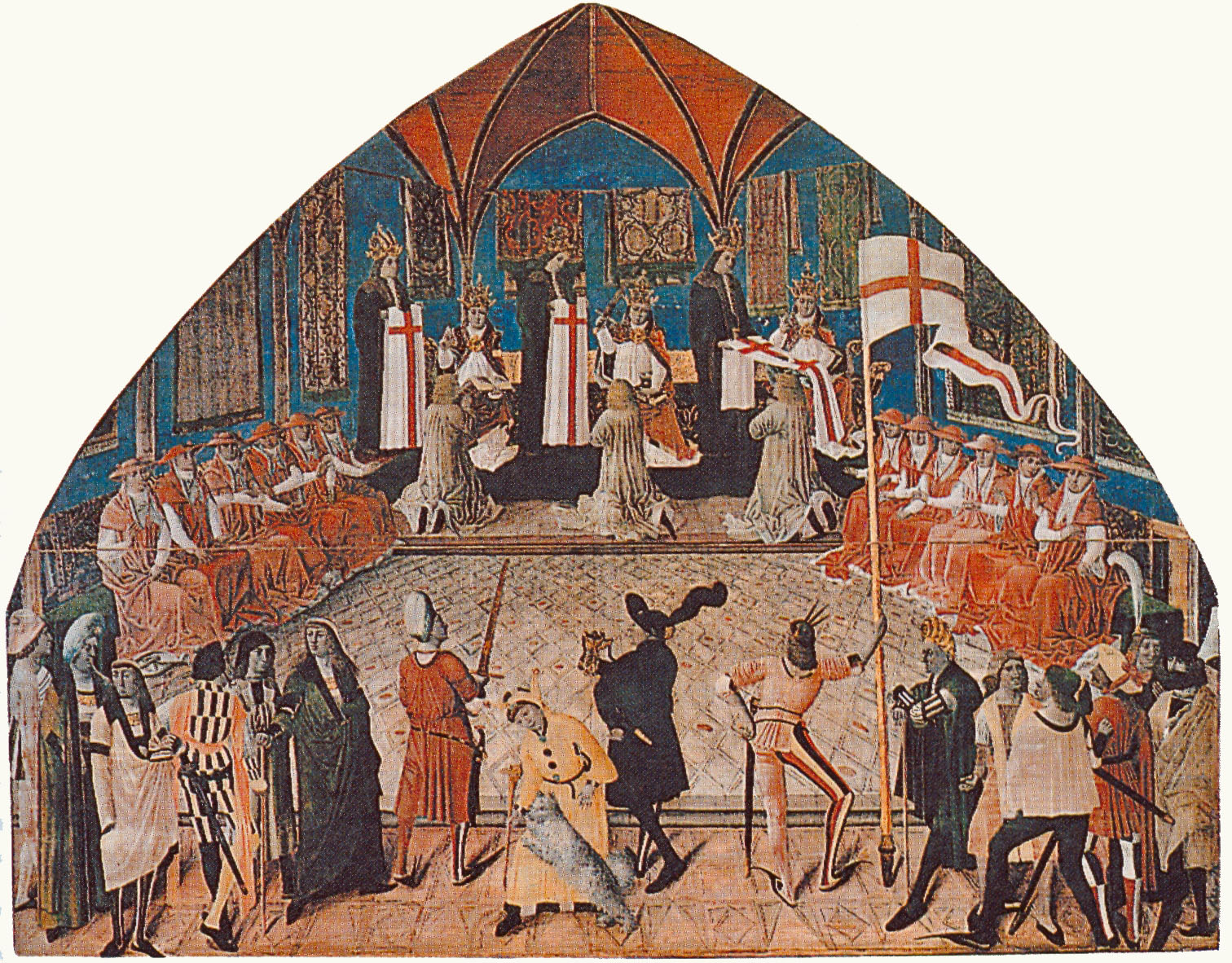
On 1 January 1469 in the presence of Emperor Frederick III Pope Paul II accolades Johann Siebenhirter the first Grand Master of the St. George's Knights in the Lateran Basilica

The city was alerted many times during the Austrian–Hungarian War. First in 1477 Grand master Johann Siebenhirter of the newly founded (1469) Order of Saint George of Carinthia "defenders of environment" occupied the city in order to defend the city. They were dedicated to defend the borders of Austrian lands from the Eastern menaces. Originally set against the Ottomans the order found itself in between Matthias of Hungary and the Holy Roman Emperor Frederick, the latter who imposed as the founder knight of the order. Siebenhirter placed the headquarters of the Order from Millstatt to Wiener Neustadt. In May 1478 he commanded the cottars of the mortgaged Hungarian villages Kismarton and Fraknó – of which he was the captain of, and in which he had spawned the Ordership – to drudge-work in the fortification labour of the city. After the siege of Vienna he visited Matthias to compromise the status of Neustadt. As a result, they concluded a truce regarding the territories owned by the Order and exchanged their prisoners of war. The treaty meant the immunization of the Order off the Austrian–Hungarian War. This was a contradicting situation as Siebenhirter kept his captain office of Neustadt in the meantime. Siebenhirter also committed himself that his knights at Wartenstein would refuse any support request from the Emperor. Also he could continue to run the Order in the lands under Matthias' authority.

== The siege ==
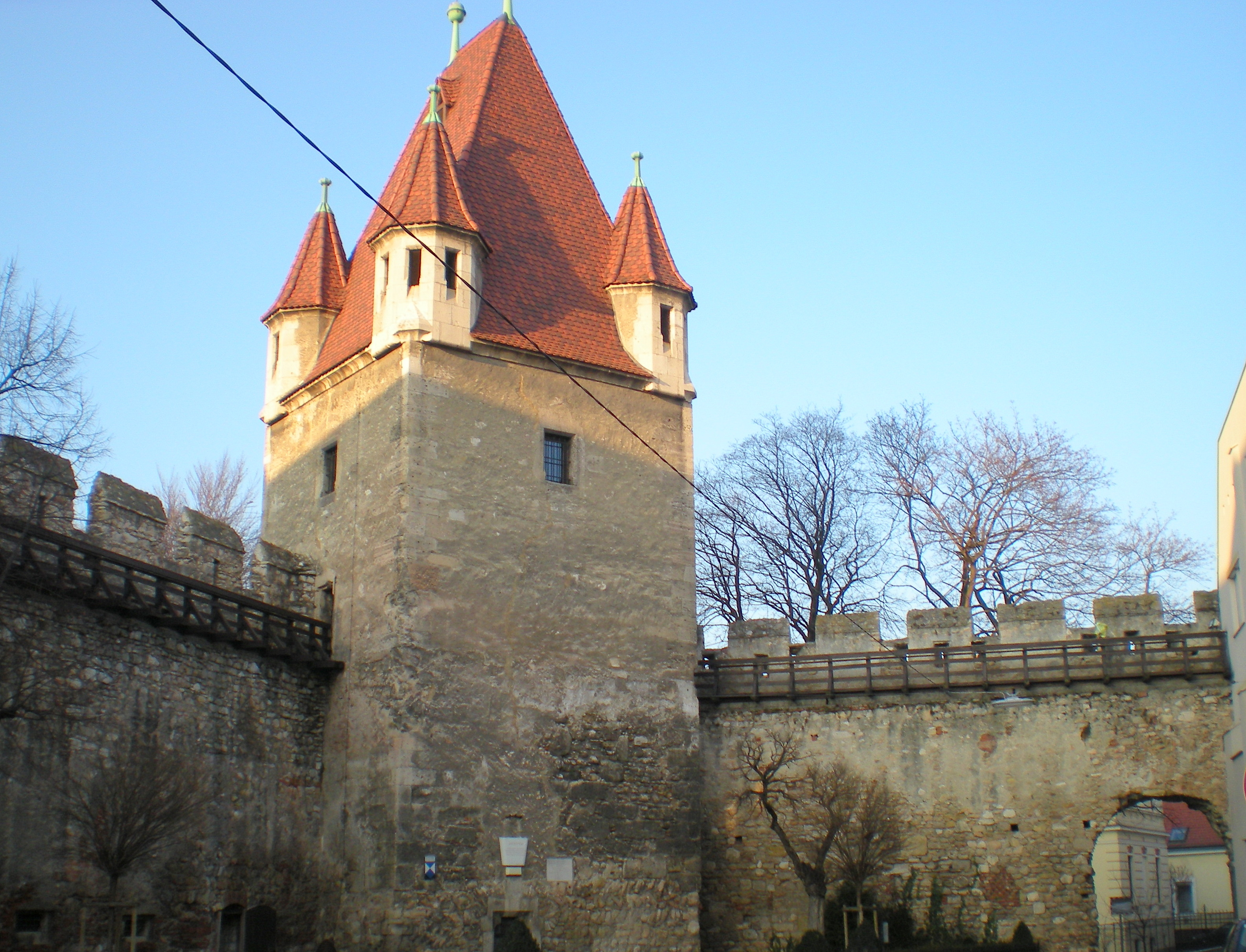
Tower at the northwestern corner of Wiener Neustadt's defensive wall

Wiener Neustadt was a well-defended and equipped fortress town of its time. The town was surrounded by three ditches and a powerful rectangular chain of ashlar stone walls, the suburbs were protected by a wide water ditch against sudden attacks, with four gate exits on drawbridges to the city. At the Ungarthore (English: Hungarian gate) stood the ducal castle with high walls and four stone towers. At the back of the castle laid the Thiergarten enclosed by a deep moat. The surrounding area was swampy and gritty, which complicated the task of the besiegers. The fortifications were provided with arquebuses and machines with a fire range of 2.000 steps.

After the siege of Vienna King Matthias urged his troops to encircle Wiener Neustadt, which could pose a possible threat to the conquered lands in later times. He sent captains Stephen Zápolya, Ladislaus Kanizsay, Jakob Székely, Wilhelm Tettauer und Stephan Báthory to begin the siege in 1486. They constructed four siege towers. Upon the prediction of his astrologists he joined them on 13 January 1487 after one year of the siege.

After his arrival Matthias realized the errors made by his captains. He found the ring of siege not tight enough. He pulled the circle closer and several watchtowers were built. He instructed the rotation of the reserves in the siege shifts so he was always able to assault with fresh soldiers. The Black Army was ordered to attack the suburbs of Vienna; they crossed the ditch, set fire in the suburbs and drove the inhabitants away, and a part of his troops rushed to assist in the ongoing tense battle at the trenches around the inner city. The drawbridge collapsed, causing many people falling into the trenches where they drowned, others were killed by Hungarians, who advanced to the gates of the city. The next day the citizens withdrew themselves to the Ungarthore in the cover of the drawbridge in the back suburbs of the outer city. Matthias on the other hand reached the moat in front of the Wienerthore (English: Viennese gate) and moved his heavy guns forward, including six enormous ones previously captured from the Ottomans, and brought siege machines that were made to fill the trenches and called for transport pinnaces to serve as mobile bridges. He ordered the constant shooting of the fortifications, and subsequently destroyed six towers including the southwest corner tower. So the garrison of Wiener Neustadt lacked tall buildings to install the long-range firearms, they mounted them to the bell towers of the churches. They were still able to bombard the Hungarian main camp. Despite being a devoted Christian Matthias allowed the shelling of the churches except in case of high risk to conflagrate the town with it. Meanwhile, Johann von Königsberg and Ruprecht von Reichenberg successfully broke through the closures and brought in supplies. Reichenberg even torched two of the siege towers on his way out. After seven months with several break-in, dig-in, and treachery attempts the city deputies came to the royal camp requesting the cessation of hostilities. On the third day of negotiations, on 2 July, Johann Wulfersdorf and King Matthias agreed on the following terms:

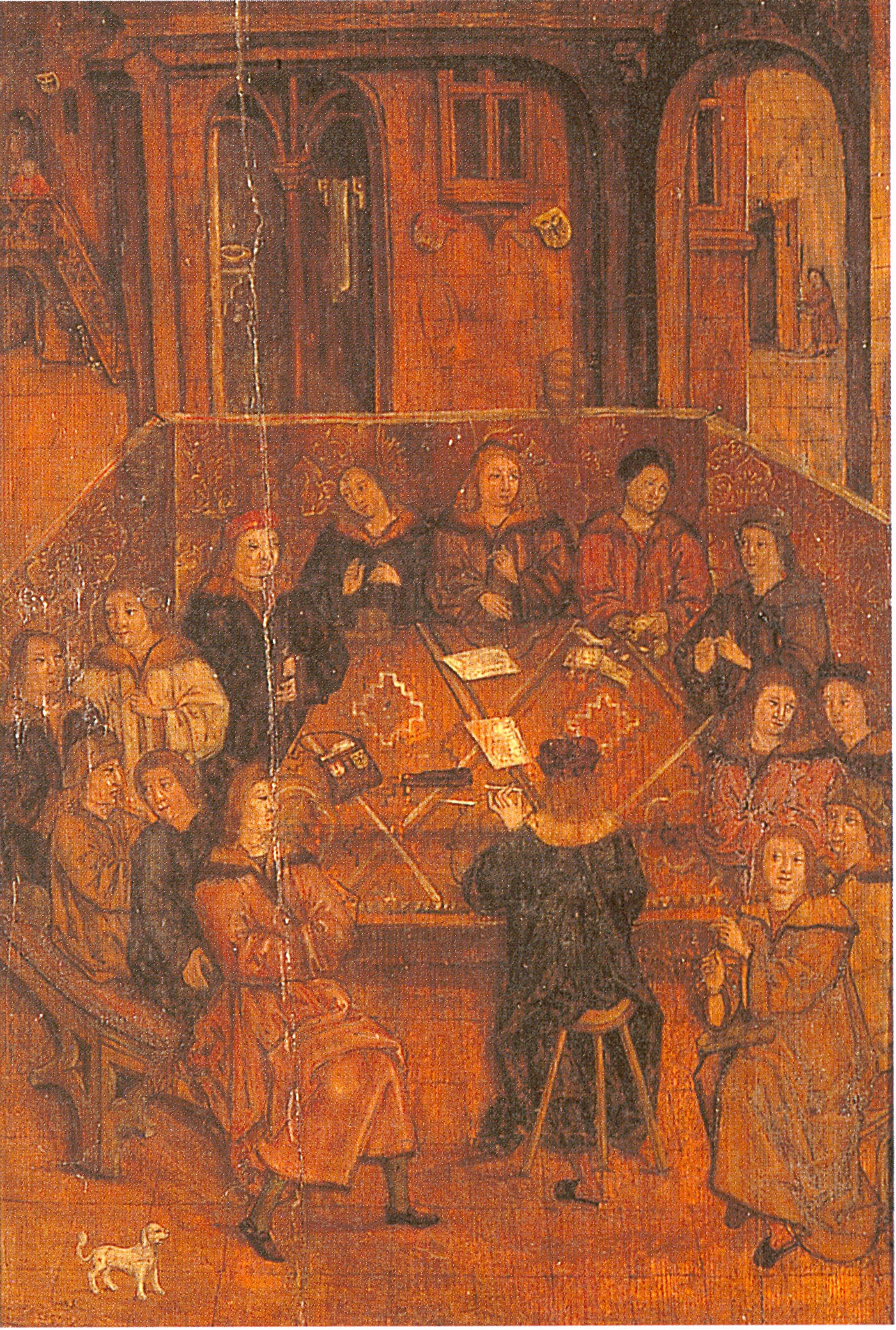
contemporary picture of the town council of Wiener Neustadt

The parties wait until 16 August and there should be peace between him and the inhabitants of the castle and town; to this time an imperial army of at least 3000 man must reach the limits of the city gates without the aid of Wiener Neustadt, and thus the siege is automatically lifted, otherwise on the day set the town and castle passes to the King. The commanders and troops as well as the people who want to leave, are free to do so with all of their possessions up to the capacity of 300 wagons but has to leave the Imperial holdings in place. The King confirms the city on its privileges. He also promises to indemnify and return all goods that were taken or devastated. The parties can not approach each other, any transgressor must be gunned down, without breaking this peace.

Rumor was it within the city that an imperial army was coming to their liberation, while Matthias knew what an impossible task it would have been to raise such an army, so the belligerents were both satisfied with the outcome.

The King decided to spend the time between on forcing the nearby Austrian lands to succumb. Schottwien was the first to surrender itself to Hungary after one day of siege on 12 July. Next came Mürzzuschlag, then Kindberg, Matthias gained full control over the Semmering Pass, altogether 20 municipalities surrendered to him.

Meanwhile, Albert III, Duke of Saxony intervened by the request of Frederick. He gathered an army on his own cost encompassing 3.000 men big enough to fulfill the relief contract. He marched to Linz where he got support from its archbishop Johann von Salzburg and captain Gotthard von Starhemberg and was ready to go for Vienna Neustadt. He officially declared war on Hungary on 9 August. The two armies met at Sankt Pölten where only minor skirmishes occurred but no major confrontation. Matthias wrote a letter in which he declared, that he bears war with Frederick as an Archduke of Austria and not as the Emperor, after which the Duke replied 25 August the Emperor's hereditary lands belong to the Holy Roman Empire and should not be regarded as casually as something separate from that. While this diplomatic correspondence appointed deadline to lift the siege of Wiener Neustadt had passed. On 17 August 1487 the city was handed over to Matthias peacefully. Thus on 14 October Matthias met with Albert, where a truce was agreed. Albert, no other means than only verbally supported and sometimes insulted by Emperor Frederick came to the decision – to the discontent of Frederick – to cease the war against Matthias on 12 December. They chose Pope Innocent VIII to bring justice to their dissension. Frederick put a veto on the agreement though the parties concerned it done.

== Aftermath ==
Following the siege a truce was concluded by the Holy See mediator of Raimund Peraudi between Frederick and Matthias in 1488. Frederick agreed in a status quo because he was already busy with the Brugge Revolt in Flanders, in which his son Maximilian I was kept hostage by the citizens and his personal presence was needed to solve the situation. In the negotiation Matthias was represented by his Austrian sympathizer counts Christoph von Liechtenstein-Nikolsburg and Leopold Brantz. Matthias lifted the custom taxes of vine import for the Order of Saint George of Carinthia. Simultaneously Matthias reconquered the cities of Kismarton (Eisenstadt) and Fraknó (Forchtenstein), which in contrast Frederick – as bestow ruler assigned in Peace Treaty of Wiener Neustadt in 1463 – immediately gifted to the Order of Saint George to spark tensions. Siebenhirter on the other hand on 13 February 1488 waived his right to the villages and subsequently was granted the towns of Trautmannsdorf and Wartenstein in exchange by Matthias. He also successfully made this agreement ratified by Frederick on 30 April 1489.
