= Siege of Vienna (1485) =

Siege during the Austrian-Hungarian War

- Part of the Austrian-Hungarian War (1477–1488)
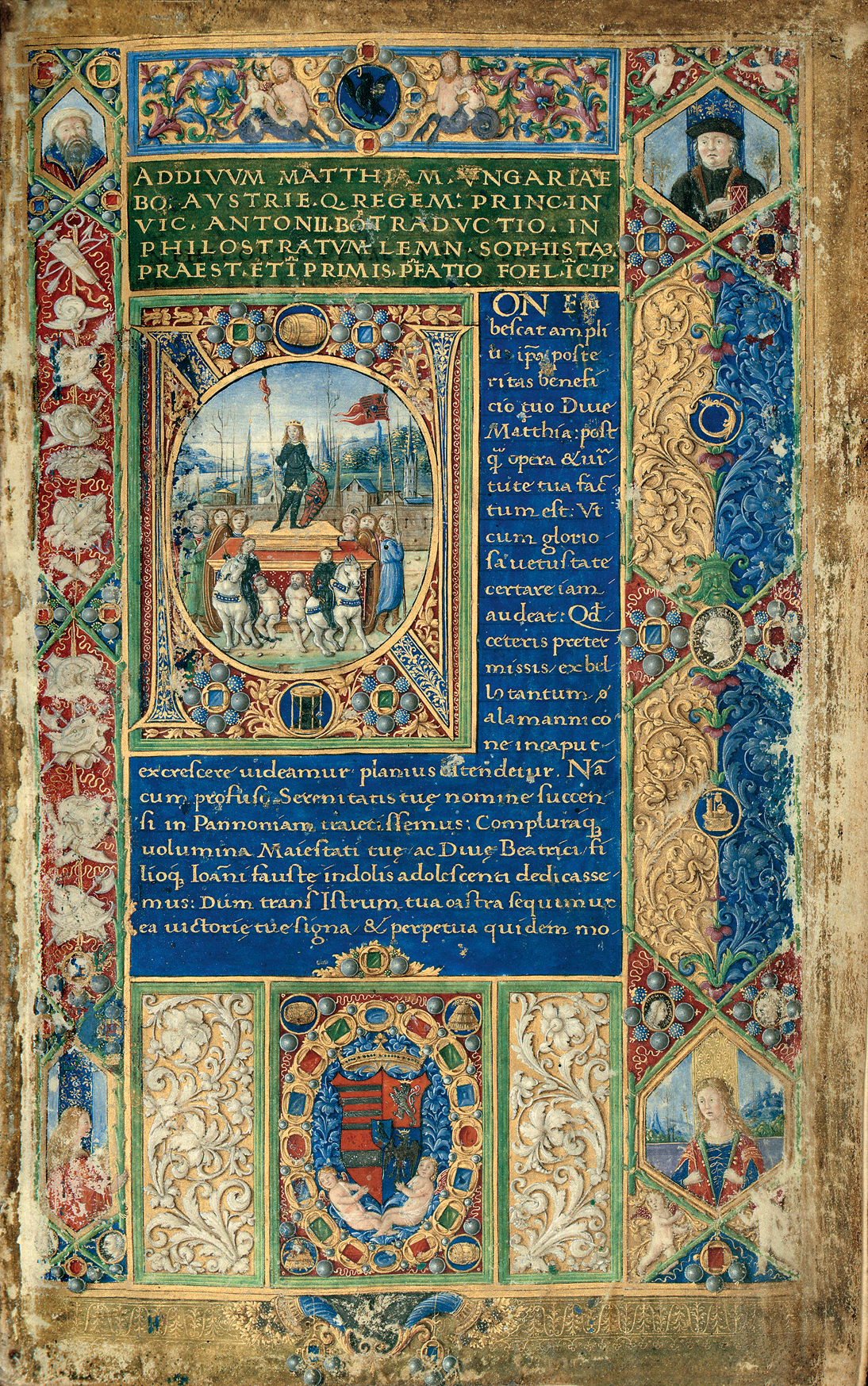
- Matthias marching into Vienna
Date	29 January 1485 – 1 June 1485 (4 months and 3 days)
Location	Vienna, Lower Austria, Holy Roman Empire 48°12′30″N 16°22′23″E
Result	Hungarian victory

Belligerents
Holy Roman Empire	Kingdom of Hungary

Commanders and leaders
Hanns von Wulfestorff; Caspar von Lamberg^{[c]} Bartholomeus von Starhemberg^{[c]} Andreas Gall^{[c]} Ladislaus Prager^{[c]} Alexander Schiffer^{[c]} Tiburtius von Linzendorf^{[c]} Leonhard Fruhmann^{[c]} Johann Karrer^{[c]}	Matthias Corvinus^{[d]} Peter Geréb de Vingard ^{[d]} Stephen Zápolya^{[d]} Stephen V Báthory; Laurence of Ilok^{[d]}

Units involved
Imperial Army	Black Army of Hungary

Strength
2,000 foot soldiers 1,000 cavalry 20,000 civilians Reinforcements: 200 cavalry 300 fusiliers 60 archers^{[a]}	10,000 foot soldiers 18,000 cavalry
- Location within Austria Siege of Vienna (1485) (Central Europe)

The siege of Vienna was a decisive siege in 1485 of the Austrian–Hungarian War. It was a consequence of the ongoing conflict between Frederick III and Matthias Corvinus. After the fall of Vienna it was merged with Hungary from 1485 to 1490. Matthias Corvinus also moved his royal court to the newly occupied city. However Vienna did not become the capital of Hungary.

Vienna was isolated in 1483–84 as surrounding strongholds fell, and the Battle of Leitzersdorf opened the way for a full siege. Despite severe famine, Frederick III briefly relieved the city via the Danube. After taking several defensive strongholds in 1485, Matthias encircled Vienna, bombarded it with siege guns, and advanced from Leopoldstadt. The defenders fought hard but starvation proved decisive; by April supplies collapsed and on 1 June the city surrendered in exchange for preserved privileges. Matthias entered triumphantly and ruled Vienna leniently, granting tax exemptions and keeping most councillors in place. Hungary controlled Vienna and Upper Austria until Matthias’s death in 1490.

== Background ==
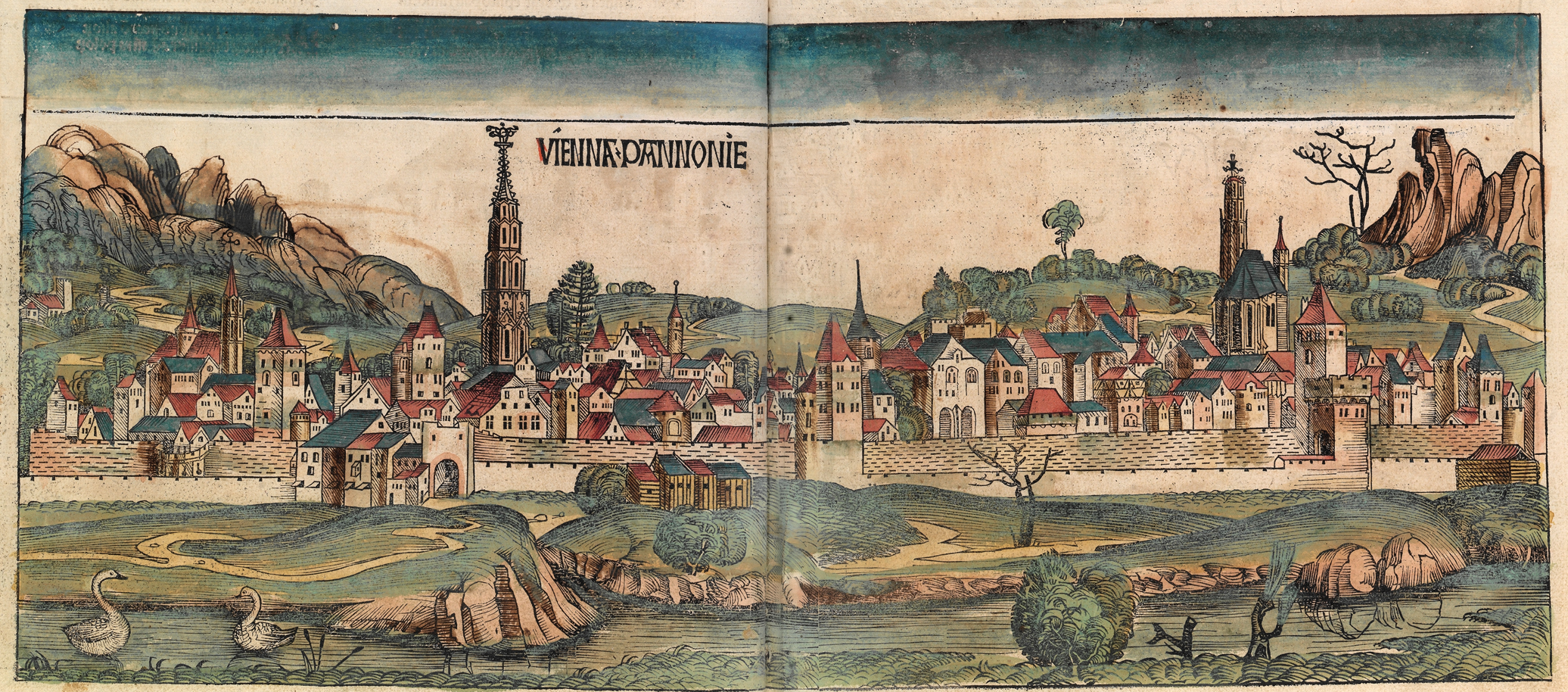
Vienna in 1493

In 1483 and 1484, Vienna was already being cut off from the Holy Roman Empire because its concentric defensive strongholds, including Korneuburg, Bruck, Hainburg, and later Kaiserebersdorf, had all fallen. One of the most important engagements was the Battle of Leitzersdorf, which made the following year's siege possible. The city was ravaged by famine, but the emperor, Frederick III, managed to send in some vital supplies with a breakthrough to the city by 16 vessels on the Danube. On 15 January, Matthias called on the city to surrender, but Captain von Wulfestorff refused to do so, in the hope that an imperial relief force would arrive in time. The blockade was fully in place as soon as Matthias attacked Kaiserebersdorf, where he became the target of an assassination attempt, when a cannonball nearly killed him. Matthias suspected treachery, as the accuracy of the shot had been too precise to have come from a long-distance cannon. Only someone who knew the whereabouts of the king would have been able to come so near to killing him. He accused Jaroslav von Boskowitz und Černahora, the brother of his mercenary Captain Tobias von Boskowitz and Černahora, of having been bribed to turn against the king. Jaroslav was summarily beheaded without any chance to clear his name. The events angered his brother Tobias to the point that he ended up returning to the service of Frederick and was placed in charge of his campaigns to try to reconquer his lost lands after the death of Matthias in 1490.

After Kaiserebersdorf was captured in mid-1485, the fate of Vienna was sealed.

== Siege ==
Matthias stationed his armies at the Hundsmühle flour mills and in Gumpendorf on the south side of the Vienna River.^{[b]} The King had previously brought in seventeen siege guns to Austria and with it he ordered a constant barrage of the city. At the same time, he also ordered the construction of two siege towers (one of which was later burnt by the resisting Viennese militia). Matthias made his incursion into Leopoldstadt on 15 May, which made the final assault imminent. One of Frederick's best generals, Hans von Wulfersdorfer, defended the city walls against the king, but he could not work miracles. Although the Viennese defenders occasionally broke out of the castle and set fire to one of the siege towers during the March, the outcome of the siege was ultimately decided by the depletion of supplies. Unable to build up sufficient food reserves as a result of the 1484 campaigns, exacerbated by the start of the winter siege (which made it impossible to sow the fields or build up additional food reserves), the city of 50,000 people faced severe famine by April, and the organisation within the walls began to organise for the opening of the city gates, which took place on 1 June. The Viennese people realized that and negotiated to surrender the inner city to the Hungarian king. They insisted only that their citizens' privileges would be preserved and a guarantee of safe passage. On 1 June, at the head of a column of his soldiers, Matthias entered the heart of Vienna behind its city walls in spectacular triumph. Five days later, the city councillors of Vienna swore an oath of allegiance to their new ruler, who took the title of Prince of Austria after his conquest. Meanwhile, the imperial city did not fare badly under Hungarian rule either, as in exchange for the lost privileges, Matthias granted it several years of tax exemption, granted it its old freedom, and delegated to the Vienna City Council only one of his men, István Szapolyai, the chief captain.

== Aftermath ==
In the Salzburg Manifesto, Frederick ordered the Austrian states to refuse Matthias's demand for the assembly of a Reichstag. He also put forward that soon-to-be Emperor Maximilian I would come to an aid. According to tradition, that is the origin of A.E.I.O.U., said to be a secret message to all Austrian provinces.

At the end of the campaign, Hungary controlled all of Upper Austria as well, which remained under his control until his death, in 1490.

=== Administrative issues ===
Matthias deprived Vienna of its staple right, which had so much violated the commercial interests of the nearby countries so much that they formed the Visegrád Group to secure a bypass route away from the city. Vienna enjoyed tax exemption under Matthias' rule. He also delegated a member, Stephen Zápolya, to the Council of Vienna but left the rest of the councillors in their position. He rewarded Zápolya with the city of Ebenfurth and appointed him as the captain of Vienna and governor of the Austrian provinces incorporated into Hungary. The bishop of Pécs, Sigismund Ernuszt, was promoted to vice-governor, and Nikolaus Kropatsch took care of the military affairs. The prominent captains received houses in Vienna.

== Notes ==
- ^{a} Geissau pp. 35
- ^{b} Geissau pp. 36–37 (Hundsmühle and Heumühle were Middle age flour mills in Vienna next to the "Am Gries" marshes on the right bank of the Wien river)
- ^{c} Geissau pp. 41–42
- ^{d} Geissau pp. 52
