= Treaty of Wiener Neustadt =

1463 peace treaty between Hungary and the Holy Roman Empire

Capitula concordie dudu(m) inter glo- riasissimu(m) principe(m) d(omi)n(u)m Fridericu(m) Rom(a)noru(m) imperatore(m) semp(er) augu- stu(m) etiam p(ro) suis heredib(us) expresse no(m)inato inclitissimo Romanoru(m) rege necno(n) cia- re memorie Mathia(m) hu(n)garie rege(m) ac regni hu(n)garie prelatos et p(ro)ceres super successio(n)e in eadem regno r(on)ciusa hincin- de acceptata et bulle co(n)firmatorie, fe(licis) re- (cordantionis) pii p(a)pe secu(n)di infrascripte inserta
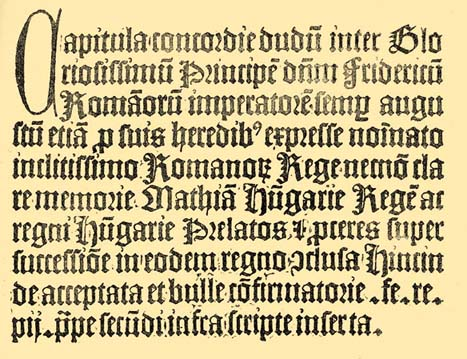
- Printed cover page of the treaty
- Type: peace treaty
- Drafted: 1459–1462
- Signed: 19 July 1463
- Location: Wiener Neustadt
- Sealed: after the approbation of Pope Pius II, Rome, 22 October 1463
- Effective: 1491, 1526
- Condition: Peace of Pressburg (1491), western territories reapproval, Ferdinand I became Hungarian King
- Expiration: 1502 Rohonc is not affected by it anymore 1626, Fraknó, Kabold defrayed by the House of Esterházy; 1647, western territories reincorporated into Hungary; 1946, Hungary's transition to republic
- Signatories: Matthias Corvinus, Buda, 16 July 1463; Frederick III, Wiener Neustadt, 19 July 1463
- Parties: Kingdom of Hungary Holy Roman Empire
- Ratifiers: Matthias Corvinus, Buda, 23–24 April 1464; Hungarian barons and nobility, Székesfehérvár, 3&8 April 1464; Hungarian negotiators, Székesfehérvár, 3 April 1464
- Language: latin
- Languages: Hungarian (2000), Mid-upper German,

The Treaty of Wiener Neustadt was a treaty between the Kingdom of Hungary and the Holy Roman Empire. It was preceded by the Truce of Radkersburg and followed by the Peace of Pressburg. It deals with succession issues and ascertains the territory mortgages in Moson, Sopron and Vas counties.

== Background ==
After the death of King Ladislaus V in Prague on 23 January 1458, Matthias was proclaimed King of Hungary at Buda, with the help of his uncle Michael Szilágyi. Meanwhile, in February 1459 Nicholas of Ilok joined by some other discontent Hungarian counts elected Holy Roman Emperor Frederick III as the Hungarian King in Ilok's castle at Güssing. Frederick claimed the throne as his rightful inheritance from Albert II of Germany. Pius II became Pope in 1458 only 5 years after the Ottomans conquered Byzantium. Afraid of further Turkish aggression, he called for a crusade. He wanted to reconcile the two kings who both sought each other's crown.

Frederick held an advantage, with the support of some Hungarian nobles as well as holding western Hungary including the Hungarian town of Sopron and the Hungarian crown itself, which he received from Queen Elizabeth of Luxembourg (wife of Albert II) on 25 February 1441. He also borrowed from her 100,000 ducats for Sopron and another 8000 for the crown.

Matthias had Czech King George of Poděbrady (declared a heretic by Pius) and the Hussite mercenary leader John Jiskra on his side. Matthias allied with Albert VI, Frederick's brother, with whom he brought war at the time. The Pope mediated between the parties with less success. With the odds against him, Matthias was forced to secretly engage in negotiations. He sent János Vitéz to Frederick in Graz in the beginning of 1462, helped by papal observer Hieronymus Landus. They partially agreed on the status of the Holy Crown and the cities of Fraknó, Kabold, Kismarton, Kőszeg, Sopron, and Rohonc. They fixed the terms of the inheritance of the Hungarian throne after Matthias, overruling the alliance between Matthias and Albert and forbade him to remarry after the death of his wife, Catherine of Poděbrady. The negotiations ended in May. This is considered a pre-contract for the Peace Treaty of Wiener Neustadt though most of the conditions were kept secret. In Sopron, the representatives of the Hungarian ecclesiastical and secular classes accepted all terms of these negotiations.

These terms were:

- The western (Hungarian) territories currently regarded as crown mortgages
- The possession of the Holy Crown
- The governmental and juridical regulations of the crown mortgages
- The rights of the ecclesiastical properties of the crown mortgages
- Obligation for a mutual war against the Ottoman Empire
- The bearing rights for the title "King of Hungary"
- Support for Grand Duke Maximilian I
- Regulation of the inheritance of the Habsburgs as Kings of Hungary
- The matters of the coronation of a supposed Habsburg Hungarian King

== The treaty ==
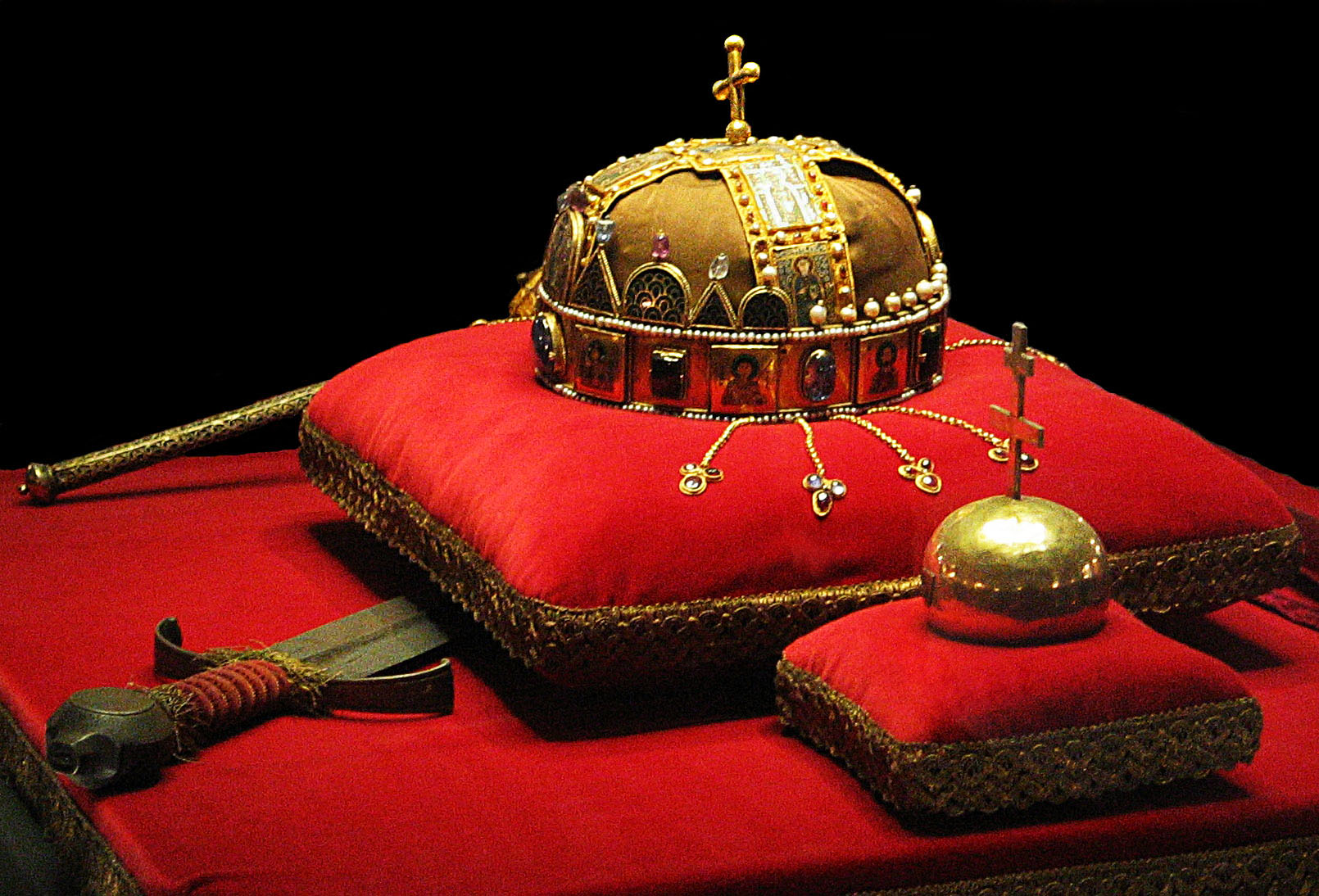
The Holy Crown, one of the provisos of the agreement

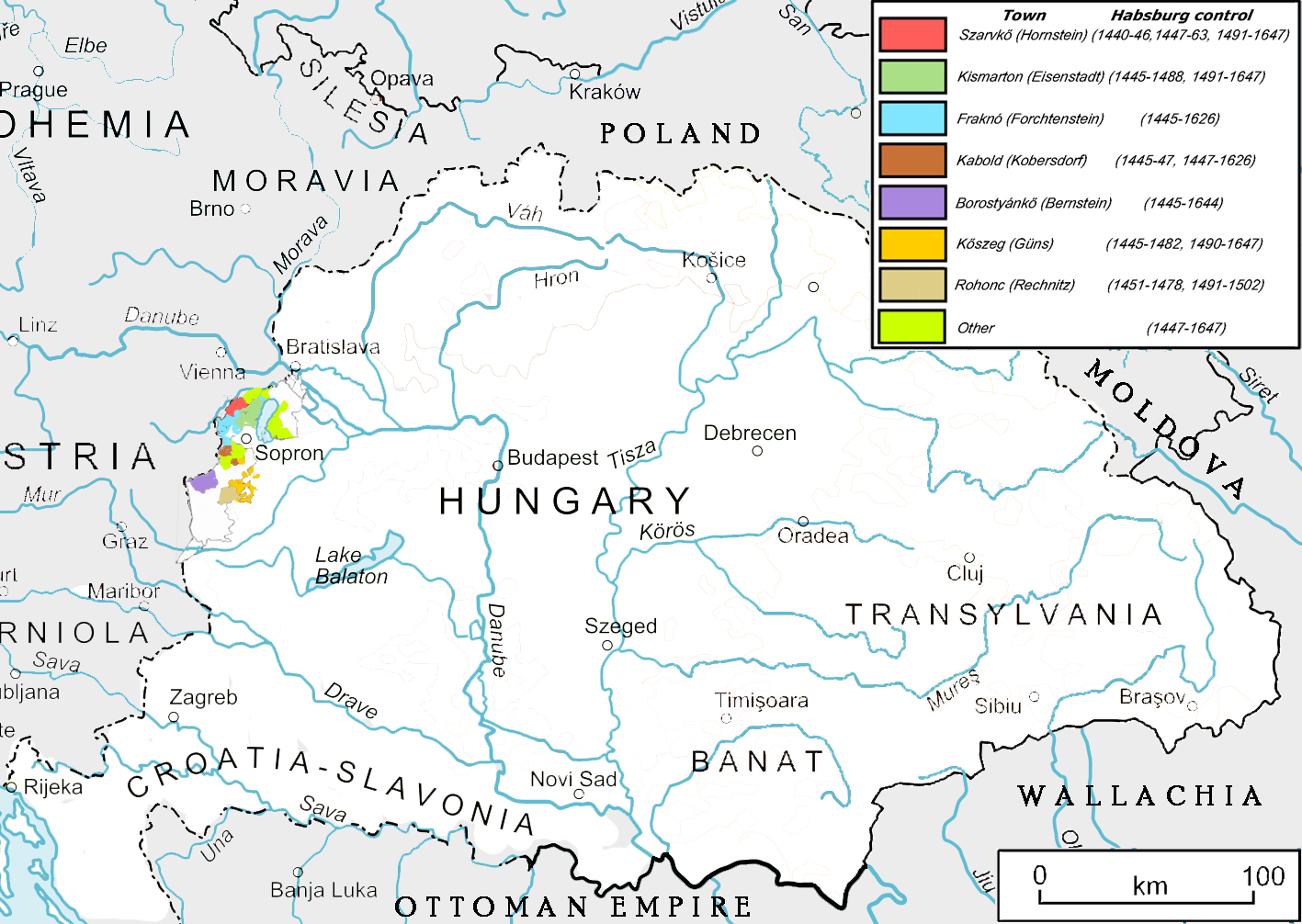
Border mortgages were in the main scope of the negotiations

The treaty was officially signed on 19 July 1463 in Wiener Neustadt. The aforementioned western territories were mortgaged to the Holy Roman Empire until the year 1647 but also had an option for the actual Hungarian ruler to redeem the cities of Fraknó and Kabold for 40,000 golden florins after Frederick's death. (The number of redeemable cities for this price is lowered to 2 from the 5 in the pre-contract in Graz.) The Hungarian crown and the city of Sopron were retrieved in exchange for an immediate 80 000 florins. Furthermore, it was settled that if Matthias died without a legitimate son, his Kingdom would pass to Frederick and Maximilian. In the secret clause of the treaty, Frederick lost control of John Jiskra and his army, which allowed Matthias to hire them into his service, which would form the core of the later Black Army and the spearhead of Hungarian conquests to come. It also implemented new Hussite warfare, which led to victories in upcoming battles.

=== Advantages for Hungary ===
- Instead of the original 15 forts and towns mortgaged for the Holy Roman Empire granted in the Truce of Radkersburg Matthias was able to cut their number down to 7.
- The acquisition of the crown was vital for Matthias as the Hungarian tradition only recognized those Kings as legitime who were crowned with it in the Basilica of Székesfehérvár.
- Matthias was still a protégé of Pius, who made the European dynasties acknowledge him. The rights of the Hungarian clergy were maintained concerning church taxes in Hungary.
- Though stating a former promise for a Habsburg succession, it preserved the rights of the Hungarian nobility for electing the new King.
- John Jiskra was promised royal pardon and was given two castles (Şoimuş and Lipova) and his soldiers received a payment of 25,000 ducats. This meant the beginning of the formation of a banner-independent royal army and a chain of military successes for Hungary in the following years. It also gave him the opportunity to demolish the Hussite stronghold of Katzenstein (in the vicinity of Sopron) and thus convince its Czech captain František Hag to join his side in the Black Army.

=== Advantages for the Empire ===
The Empire gained:

- The removal of Matthias from the Emperor's brother's side in their "Fehde-war" meant the isolation of Albert VI.
- The insurance of a rightful claim for the Holy Roman Emperor by holding the title of Hungarian King and regulating the succession.
- Mandatory support by Hungary to the Empire on all grounds for any menace.
- The Emperor adopted The King as his "son", helping tighten the ties with the newly formed Hungarian dynasty.

=== Advantages for the Papal States ===
The Papal States gained:

- An alliance against the Ottoman invasion and consolidating the European situation.
- The rights of the clergy in the mortgaged territories remained intact, as the contract didn't affect them at all.
- As George of Poděbrady became useless, Matthias launched a crusade against the so-called heretic, the war favored the Papal States' interest.

== Aftermath ==
Immediately after the recovery of Sopron, Frederick III allowed Czech captain Hinko Tannfeld of Waltersdorf to sack the town on 7 September 1465. The attacking troops departed from the Austrian town of Waltersdorf, which was a direct insult to Matthias, who immediately protested. The Emperor expressed his regret but did not return the plunder. In retaliation, the garrison of Sopron withheld and foreclosed a wine shipment to Wiener Neustadt in 1466 and demanded the compensation again, which still remained undone. The treaty opened the gates for Matthias to crown himself King of Hungary. His rule led to a series of wars, and their advantageous outcome resulted in Matthias being crowned King of Bohemia (1469–1490) and Duke of Austria (1486–1490). The crusade never came into being, as the campaign funds promised by Venice were never provided. The effort eventually ended in the Bohemian Wars (1468–78) where Matthias incorporated Bohemia into Hungary. The military feud between the Holy Roman Empire and Hungary continued after the succession of the concerned Kings. The field of conflict also affected the mortgaged towns. No armed support was given to Frederick or Maximilian, as was laid in the terms. Towards the end of his reign, Matthias turned away from the papacy, by protecting the Kingdom of Naples against the Papal army in 1488, siding with the rebellious Papal citizens of Ancona in 1488 by making them a Hungarian Protectorate, and even signing a status quo peace treaty with the Ottoman Empire. Following his death, the Habsburgs strengthened the terms in the Second Treaty of Pressburg and secured in the First Congress of Vienna. They claimed the throne several times until Ferdinand I, Holy Roman Emperor co-reigned there, and Maximilian II, Holy Roman Emperor single-handedly ruled Hungary, which established a Habsburg line of succession that lasted to World War I.

== Historical significance ==
On 18 April 1490, after the death of Matthias, Emperor Maximilian I sent an offer to the Hungarian nobles in which he submitted his claims for the throne of Hungary based upon this treaty. He promised protection against Poland, assured the annexation of Matthias's conquests to Hungary, and pledged to keep the Hungarian clerks and counselors in their offices. Otherwise, he threatened to use force to gain the submission of the Hungarian Kingdom. To enforce his influence over the royal election, he ordered numerous copies of the Peace Treaty of Wiener Neustadt to be printed and distributed among the elector nobility. This was the first instance in history for using the printing press for propaganda purposes.

== See also ==
- Treaty of Pressburg (1491)
- First Congress of Vienna
- Treaty of Trianon
- Treaty of Lubowla
- Siege of Wiener-Neustadt
