= Battle of Leitzersdorf =

1484 battle of the Austrian-Hungarian War

Coordinates: 48°25′0″N 16°15′0″E

- Part of Austrian–Hungarian War (1477–1488)
Date	16 June 1484(?); 11 May 1484(?); November 1484(?)
Location	Leitzersdorf, Lower Austria
Result	Hungarian victory

Belligerents
Kingdom of Hungary	Holy Roman Empire

Commanders and leaders
István Dávidházy; Tobias von Boskowitz and Černahora	Hanns von Wulfestorff; Heinrich Prueschink; Caspar von Rogendorf

Units involved
Black Army of Hungary	Imperial Army of the Holy Roman Empire

Strength
7,000	8,000–10,000 (Veresegyházi estimate); 6,000 (Bánlaky estimate); 8,000 foot soldiers, 4,000 heavy cavalry (Egry estimate)

Casualties and losses
"Relatively few"	1,000

The Battle of Leitzersdorf was a battle between the Holy Roman Empire and the Kingdom of Hungary in 1484. Fuelled by the earlier conflicts of Matthias Corvinus and Frederick III, Holy Roman Emperor it marked the end of anti-Ottoman preparations and initiations of a holy war. It was the only open field battle of the Austro-Hungarian War, and the defeat meant – in long terms – the loss of the Archduchy of Austria for the Holy Roman Empire.

== Background ==
Since the successful siege of Hainburg in October 1482 Queen Beatrice of Naples worked on the restoration of peace. In 1482 she envoyed the Provost of Bratislava, Georg Schönberg, Johann Hessler, Dean of Friesach and Gerhard Peuscheren, locum tenens of Fresach, repeatedly to start mediation with Johann Beckensloer Archbishop of Vienna and counselor of the Emperor. The Queen's intention with this was that Beckensloer could pose as a peace broker rather than a pro-imperial official. She offered the chance to earn himself fame by trading back the lost Salzburg area via this supposed treaty. Even though the return of these forts were demanded previously by the Emperor himself it was never realized and Matthias held them to his death. The following year, the war resumed because despite the negotiations, the parties never came to an agreement. In January 1483 the Kőszeg was captured and in April Klosterneuburg fell as well, and by constant plundering the Hungarians tried to weaken the enemy's strength. Matthias in order to concentrate the full force against the Emperor so in January 1483 he has sent agents even to the Porte to begin negotiations on a ceasefire, which had a positive outcome. He immediately reported it to the Holy Roman electoral principalities. Matthias declared he was not willing to defend the Christianity anymore unless other countries joined him.

== Premise ==
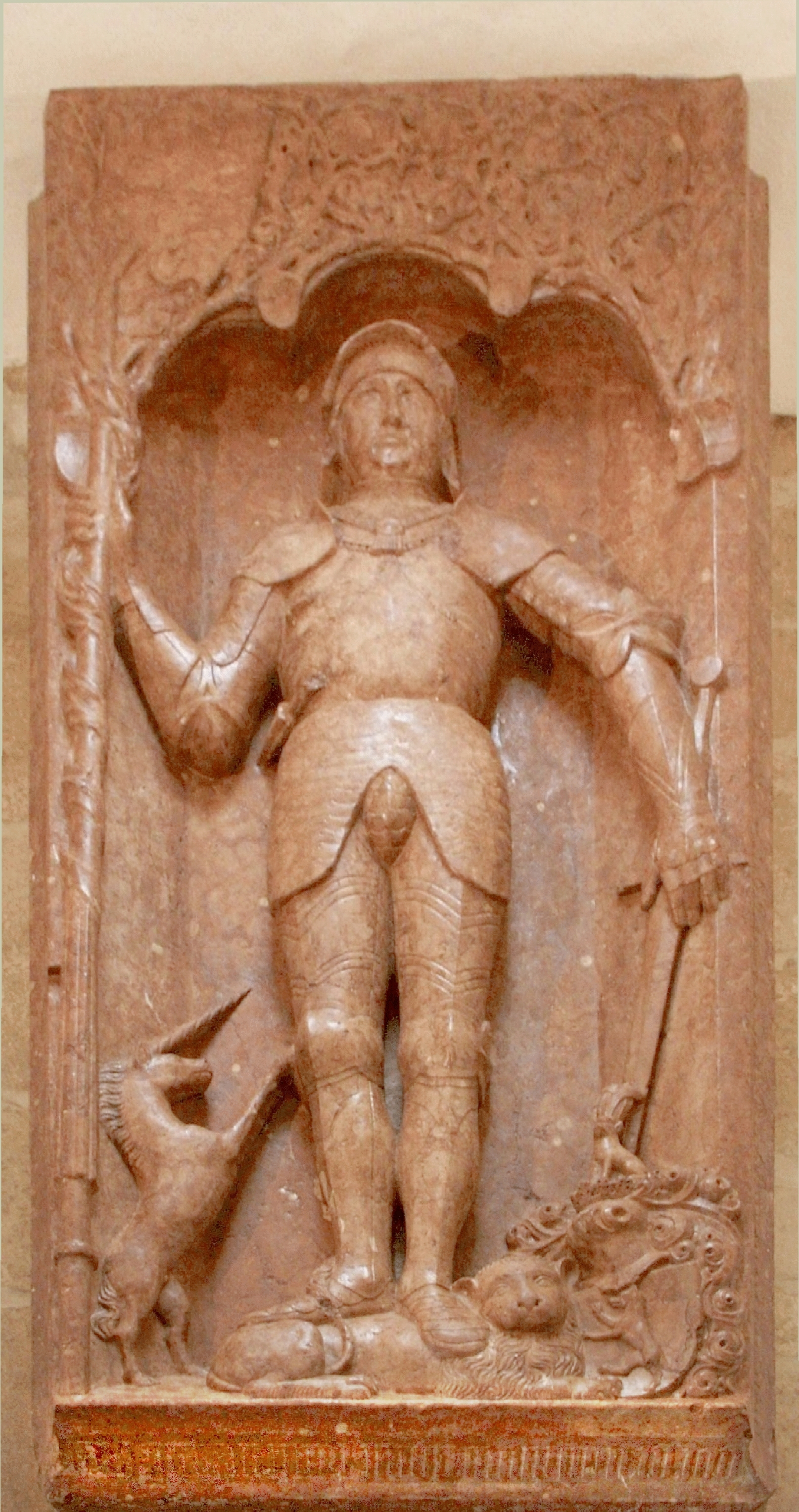
Hanns von Wulfestorff

The Hungarians attacked Lower Austria from three directions. István Dávidházy marched to Bruck an der Leitha and besieged it. On 24 February the city surrendered and on 12 March the castle was captured as well. The second wave with captain Tobias von Boskowitz and Černahora reached Krems and Stein and waited in a nearby river island. The third army led by Péter Geréb invaded the Duchy of Styria and the Duchy of Carinthia to block the Holy Roman forces from uniting. Meanwhile, Matthias occupied Kahlenberg in April and Dávidházy went on to encircle Korneuburg. The Emperor decided to relieve the city and managed to smuggle a fleet of 12 ships of supplies into the city and also sent a relief army to the scene. Fort captain Burghard Kienberger decided to resist until the arrival of the reinforcement army. Being informed of the advancing Austrians, Dávidházi opted for a pre-emptive strike in the vicinity of Stockerau.

== The battle ==
In the early course of the battle, the Imperial cavalry gained the advantage and made the Black Army retreat. The Holy Roman troops occupied the abandoned Hungarian camp, which they sacked immediately. Seeing a chance to regroup, Dávidházy planned a counter-attack on the looting, scattered Imperials. The Hungarian heavy cavalry flank attacked the Holy Roman wing that withstood for about an hour, but collapsed and fled from the battleground. After Dávidházi returned to the siege at Korneuburg he was hit by a bullet and died shortly after. Matthias took charge of the troops and implemented the takeover.

== Aftermath ==
The city of Korneuburg surrendered on 1 December after Matthias was joined by 12,000 men of the Silesian corps. The withdrawing Holy Roman Army had no other choice than to immobilize itself and split to strengthen the remaining fortresses and slow down the advance of Matthias. They were no longer in the position to take the initiative. The rest of Lower Austria was annexed the following year and Frederick had to make peace with Matthias allowing him to keep his conquests. However the conflict aggravated their relationship for the time being. While most of his armies were stationed in the North-West region of Hungary Matthias was unable to prevent the Ottomans from breaking into Bessarabia and even Hungary the same year.
