= Wiener Neustadt West Airport =

- IATA: none; ICAO: LOXN

Summary
- Airport type: Military
- Serves: Wien
- Location: Austria
- Elevation AMSL: 941 ft (287 m)
- Coordinates: 47°50′21.9″N 16°13′17.7″E

Map
- Location of Wiener Neustadt West Airport in Austria

Runways
Direction	Length		Surface
Direction	m	ft	Surface
18L/36R	1,625	5,330	Grass
04/22	1,518	4,980	Grass
14/32	972	3,190	Grass
18R/36L	808	2,650	Grass
- Source: Landings.com

Wiener Neustadt West airfield

Wiener Neustadt West Airport (ICAO: LOXN) is a military airport located 43 km (23 nmi) south-southwest of Vienna, Austria.

== See also ==
- List of airports in Austria
