= Peace of Pressburg (1491) =

1491 peace treaty between Austria and Hungary

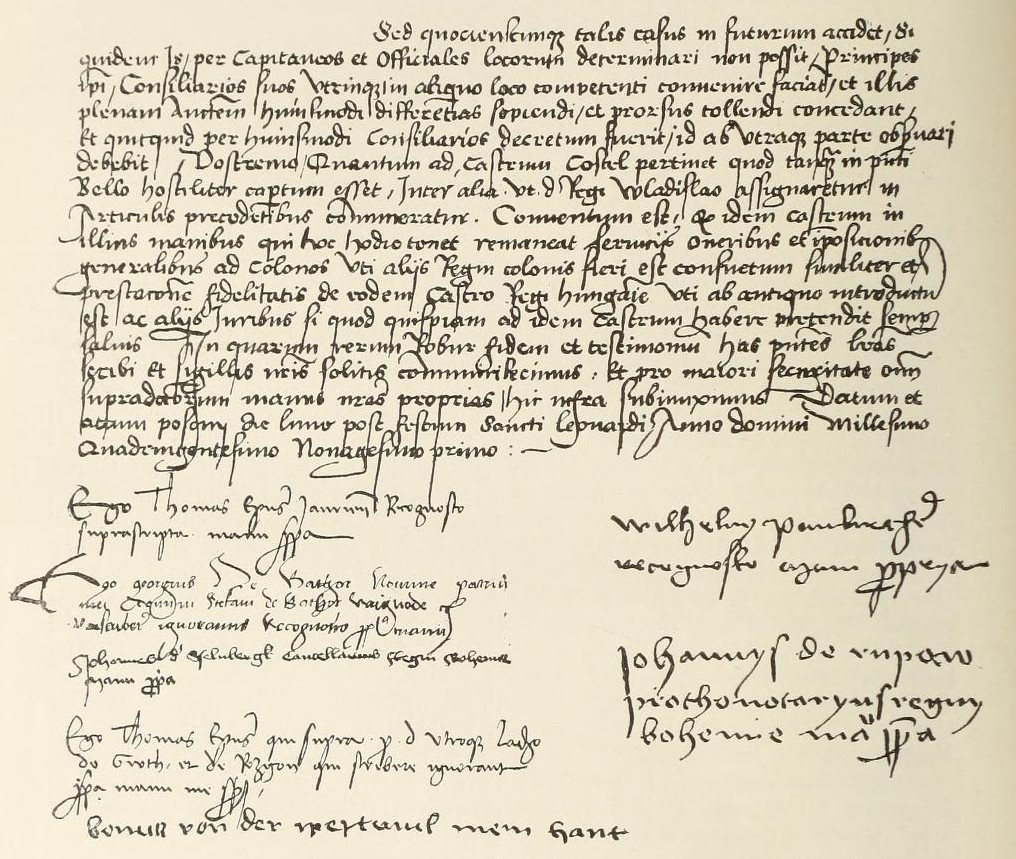
The Peace of Pressburg

The second Peace of Pressburg (also known as the Treaty of Pressburg) was a peace treaty concluded in Pressburg (then Pozsony, today's Bratislava) that brought a resolution to the earlier Austrian–Hungarian War (1477–1488). In 1490, Maximilian decided to dislodge the Hungarians from all over Austria, which succeeded, but his invasion of Hungary was repelled and the parties began to seek peace. It was signed on 7 November 1491 between King of the Romans Maximilian I and King Vladislaus II of Bohemia and Hungary. Under this agreement, Vladislaus renounced his claim on Lower Austria and agreed that Maximilian should succeed to the Hungarian crown if Vladislaus left no legitimate male issue. Vladislaus did have a son in 1506, however, so this condition had no effect.

The assembly of nobility of the Kingdom of Hungary that led to the treaty had gathered a total of 63 dignitaries from the Kingdom of Bohemia and the Kingdom of Hungary. The treaty reiterated an earlier agreement about royal succession that had been reached by Maximilian's father, Holy Roman Emperor Friedrich III, with Mathias Corvinus of Hungary.
