= Kingdom of Hungary (1301–1526) =

Former state in Central Europe

Kingdom of Hungary Magyar Királyság (Hungarian) Regnum Hungariae (Latin)
- 1301–1526
- Flags during the reign of Matthias Corvinus; Top: Royal standard Bottom: Banner at the battle of Baia, Chronica Hungarorum Coat of arms of Matthias Corvinus

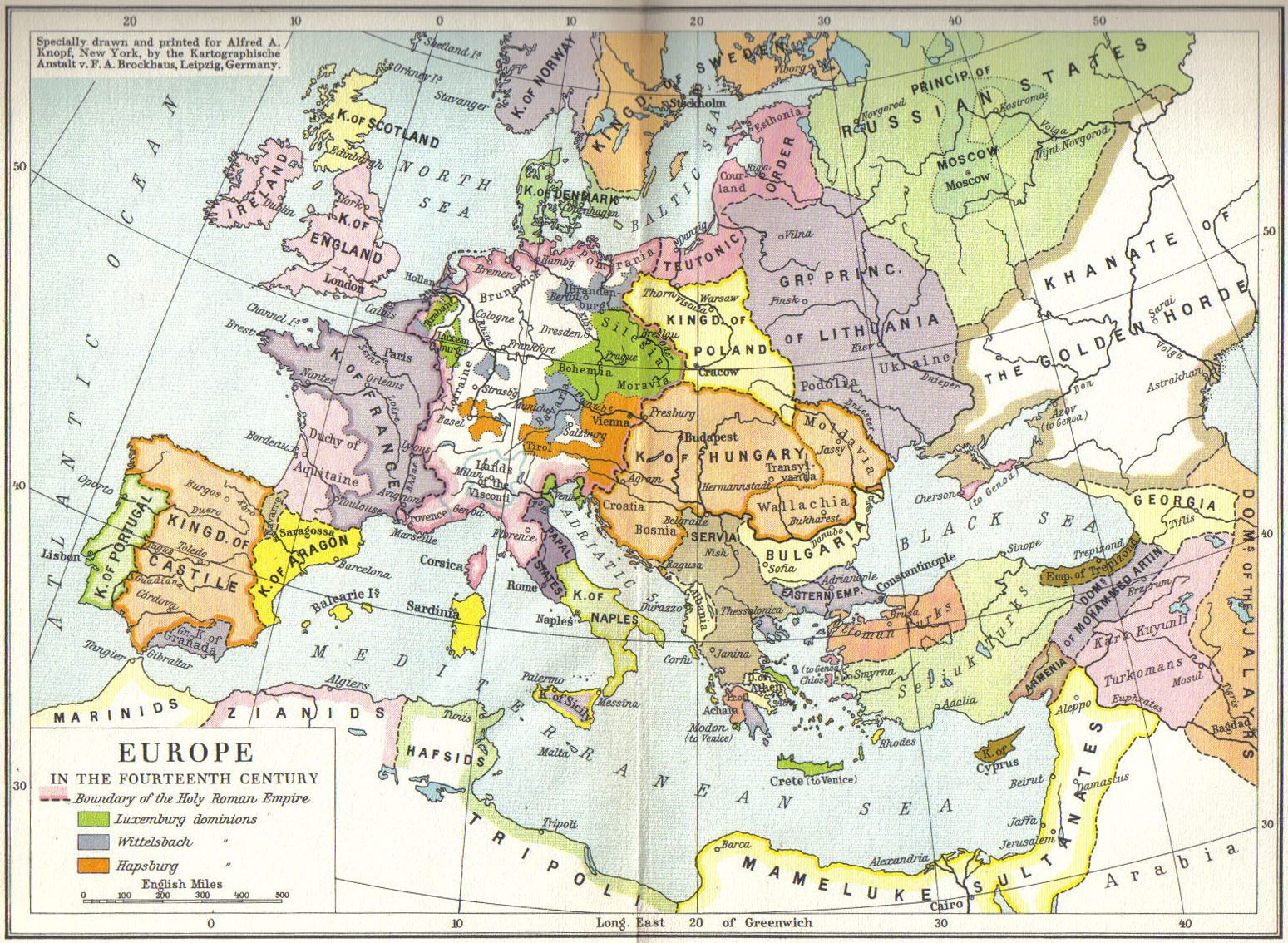
- Kingdom of Hungary in the 14th century
- Status: In personal union with the Kingdom of Croatia (see historical context section)
- Capital: Buda (until 1315; 1408–1485; after 1490); Temesvár (1315–1323); Visegrád (1323–1408); Bécs (1485–1490); Székesfehérvár (place of diets, royal seat, crowning and burial site)
- Common languages: Latin (ceremonial, liturgical and administrative), Hungarian, Croatian, Cuman, German, Greek, Slavic dialects, Romanian
- Religion: Roman Catholic (official), Eastern Orthodox, Tengrism (among Cumans) (Note: The last pagan Cumans were definitely christianized in the 16th century, mostly by conversion to Protestantism.)
- Demonym: Hungarian
- Government: Feudal monarchy
- King
  - 1301–1305 (first): Wenceslaus
  - 1516–1526 (last): Louis II
- Palatine
  - 1302–1309 (first): Máté Csák
  - 1526–1530 (last): István Báthory
- Legislature: Royal Diet
- Historical era: Medieval
  - Extinction of the Árpád dynasty: 14 January 1301
  - Interregnum: 1301–1308
  - Union of Hungary and Poland: 1370–1382, 1440–1444
  - Crusade of Varna: 1443–1444
  - Siege of Belgrade: 4–22 July 1456
  - Peace of Olomouc: 2 April 1479
  - Siege of Vienna: 29 January – 1 June 1485
  - Peasants' revolt of György Dózsa: 9 April – 15 July 1514
  - Beginning of the Reformation: 1520
  - Battle of Mohács: 29 August 1526
- Currency: Forint
Preceded by
Kingdom of Hungary under the Árpád dynasty
Succeeded by
Kingdom of Hungary (Habsburg monarchy)
Eastern Hungarian Kingdom
Ottoman Hungary

In the Late Middle Ages, the Kingdom of Hungary, a country in Central Europe, experienced a period of interregnum in the early 14th century. Royal power was restored under Charles I (1308–1342), a scion of the Capetian House of Anjou. Gold and silver mines opened in his reign produced about one third of the world's total production up until the 1490s. The kingdom reached the peak of its power under Louis the Great (1342–1382) who led military campaigns against Lithuania, southern Italy and other faraway territories.

The expansion of the Ottoman Empire reached the kingdom under Sigismund of Luxembourg (1387–1437). In the next decades, a talented military commander, John Hunyadi, directed the fight against the Ottomans. His victory at Nándorfehérvár (present-day Belgrade, Serbia) in 1456 stabilized the southern frontiers for more than half a century. The first king of Hungary without dynastic ancestry was Matthias Corvinus (1458–1490), who led several successful military campaigns and also became the King of Bohemia and the Duke of Austria. With his patronage Hungary became the first country which adopted the Renaissance from Italy.

== Background ==
The Kingdom of Hungary came into being when Stephen I, grand prince of the Hungarians, was crowned king in 1000 or 1001. He reinforced central authority and forced his subjects to accept Christianity. Although written sources emphasize the role played by German and Italian knights and clerics in the process, a significant part of the Hungarian vocabulary for agriculture, religion was taken from Southern Slavic languages. Civil wars, pagan uprisings and the Holy Roman Emperors' unsuccessful attempts to expand their authority over Hungary jeopardized the new monarchy. Its position stabilized under Ladislaus I (1077–1095) and Coloman (1095–1116). Following the succession crisis in Croatia as a result of their campaign the Kingdom of Croatia entered a personal union with the Kingdom of Hungary in 1102. Both of them were regarded as a successor by hereditary rights Coloman was crowned in Biograd in 1102 and the title now claimed by Coloman was "King of Hungary, Dalmatia, and Croatia".

Rich in uncultivated lands and in silver, gold, and salt deposits, the kingdom became a preferred target of the continuous immigration of mainly German, Italian and French colonists. The colonists were mostly peasants who settled in villages, but also large number of townsfolk arrived as craftsmen and merchants. Their arrival contributed to the development of Esztergom, Székesfehérvár and many other cities and large number of villages in various parts of the Kingdom. Situated at the crossroads of international trade routes, Hungary was affected by several cultural trends. Romanesque, Gothic, and Renaissance buildings, and literary works written in Latin prove the predominantly Roman Catholic character of the culture of the Kingdom, but Orthodox, and even non-Christian ethnic minority communities also existed. Latin was the language of legislation, administration and judiciary, but "linguistic pluralism" (János M. Bak) contributed to the survival of a number of tongues, including a great variety of Slavic dialects.

Oligarchs controlled parts of the Kingdom during the interregnum

The predominance of royal estates initially ensured the sovereign's preeminent position, but the alienation of royal lands gave rise to the emergence of a self-conscious group of lesser landholders. They forced Andrew II to issue his Golden Bull of 1222, "one of first examples of constitutional limits being placed on the powers of a European monarch" (Francis Fukuyama). The kingdom received a major blow from the Mongol invasion of 1241–1242. Thereafter, Cuman and Jassic groups were settled in the central lowlands and colonists arrived from Moravia, Poland and other nearby countries.

== History ==
=== Interregnum (1301–1323) ===
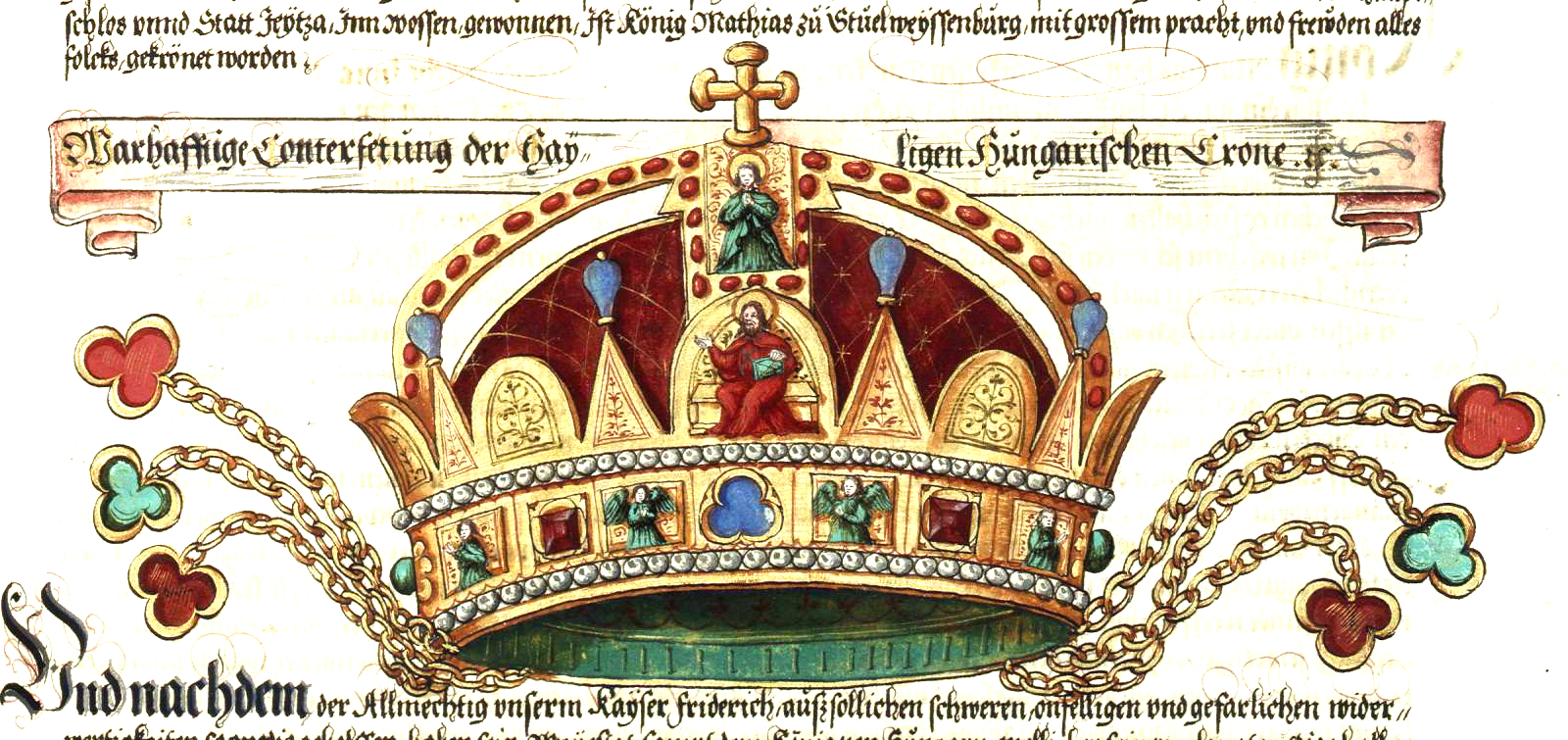
The oldest authentic representation of the Holy Crown of Hungary from 1555

Andrew III died on January 14, 1301. His death created an opportunity for about a dozen lords, or "oligarchs", who had by that time achieved de facto independence of the monarch to strengthen their autonomy. They acquired all royal castles in a number of counties where everybody was obliged either to accept their supremacy or to leave. For instance, Matthew III Csák ruled over fourteen counties in the lands now forming Slovakia, Ladislaus Kán administered Transylvania, and Ugrin Csák controlled large territories between the rivers Száva and Dráva. In Croatia the situation for the crown became even more dire, as viceroy Paul Šubić and the Babonić family achieved de facto independence, with Paul Šubić even minting his own coin and being called by contemporary Croatian historians as the "uncrowned king of the Croats".

Dynastic standard of the House of Anjou

At the news of Andrew III's death, viceroy Šubić invited Charles I of Anjou, the late Charles Martel's son, to claim the throne, who hurried to Esztergom where he was crowned king. However, most secular lords opposed his rule and proposed the throne to King Wenceslaus II of Bohemia's namesake son. The young Wenceslaus could not strengthen his position and renounced in favor of Otto III, Duke of Bavaria in 1305. The latter was forced to leave the kingdom in 1307 by Ladislaus Kán. A papal legate persuaded all the lords to accept Charles of Anjou's rule in 1310, but most territories remained out of royal control.

Assisted by the prelates and a growing number of lesser nobles, Charles I launched a series of expeditions against the great lords. Taking advantage of the lack of unity among them, he defeated them one by one. He won his first victory in the battle of Rozgony (present-day Rozhanovce, Slovakia) in 1312. However, the most powerful lord, Matthew Csák preserved his autonomy up until his death in 1321, while the Babonić and Šubić families were only subjugated in 1323.

=== The Angevins' monarchy (1323–1382) ===
Charles I introduced a centralized power structure in the 1320s. Stating that "his words has the force of law", he never again convoked the Diet. Even his most faithful partisans depended on revenues from their temporary honours, because the king rarely made land grants. This practice ensured the loyalty of the Drugeths, Lackfis, Szécsényis, and other families who emerged in his reign.

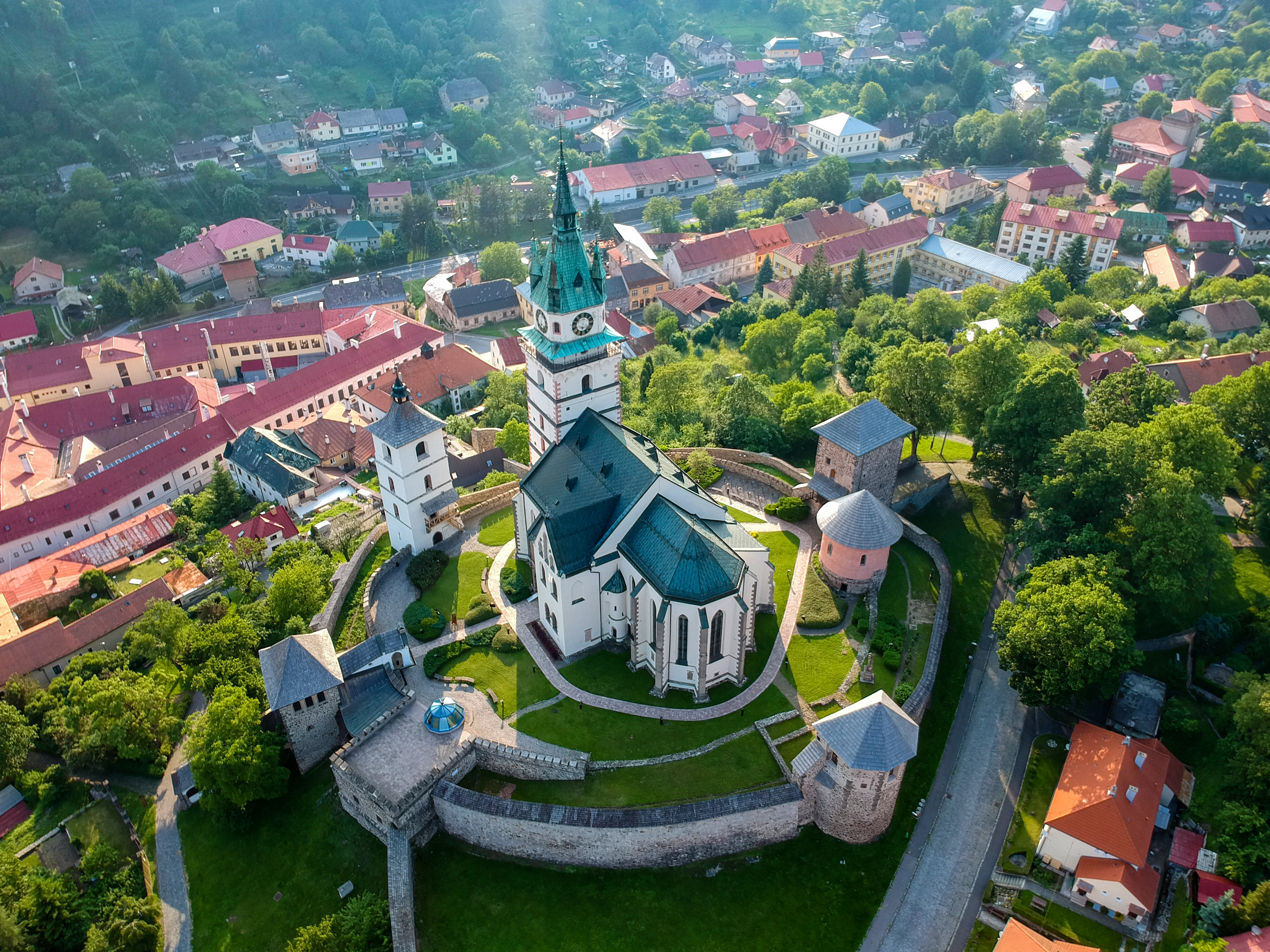
The castle at Kremnitz (Hungarian: Körmöcbánya, Slovak: Kremnica), a mining town founded by German miners from Bohemia

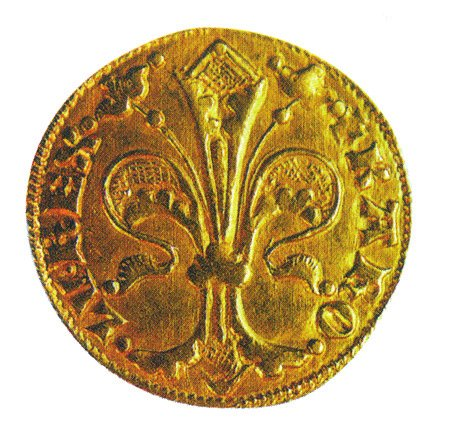
Charles I's golden forint

The king even afforded to grant privileges which contradicted customary law. For instance, he occasionally authorized daughters of noblemen to inherit their fathers' estates, although local customs required that a deceased nobleman's inherited lands were to be transferred to his agnates in lack of a son. Nevertheless, Roman law never replaced customary which gave rise to the appearance of lay officials who possessed "a good command of Latin and a fair knowledge of common law" (Pál Engel).

Charles I reformed the system of royal revenues and monopolies. For instance, he imposed the "thirtieth" (a tax on goods transferred through the kingdom's frontiers), and authorized landholders to retain one third of the income from mines opened in their estates. The new mines produced around 2,250 kilograms (4,960 lb) of gold and 9,000 kilograms (20,000 lb) of silver annually, which made up more than 30 percent of the world's production up until the Spanish conquest of the Americas in the 1490s. However, most profits from the mines were transferred to Italian and South German merchants, because the value of imported fine textiles and other goods always exceeded the price of cattle and wine exported from the kingdom.

Charles I also ordered the minting of stable golden coins modelled on the florin of Florence. His ban on trading with uncoined gold produced shortage in the European market which lasted until his death in 1342. Following this, in 1343, the Romanian-led Voivodeship of Maramureș was established, which would exist until 1402. Thereafter his widow, Elisabeth of Poland transported enormous quantities of gold to Italy in order to promote the claim of their younger son, Andrew to the Kingdom of Naples. Andrew who was Queen Joanna I of Naples's consort was assassinated in 1345. His brother, Louis I of Hungary accused the queen of his murder and led two campaigns against her in 1347 and 1350. Although he twice conquered her kingdom, she regained it on both occasions.

The first campaign against Naples was abandoned because of the arrival of the "Black Death". In Hungary, fewer locals fell victim to the epidemic than in Western Europe, because the kingdom was still an underpopulated territory with well nourished inhabitants. Indeed, colonization also continued in the 14th century. The new settlers mainly came from Moravia, Poland and other neighboring countries. They were customarily exempted of taxation for 16 years, which is reflected by the lehota ("lightening") placenames in present-day Slovakia.

Earlier distinctions between freemen, serfs and udvornici disappeared in the 14th century, because all peasants had acquired the right to free movement by the 1350s. Most of them cultivated well defined parcels with a hereditary right to use it for a rent in cash and in-kind "gifts" due to the landowner. The legal position of "true noblemen" was also standardized when the idea of "one and the same liberty" was enacted in 1351. For instance, all noblemen received the right to "adjudicate all offences committed" by the peasants living in their estates (Martyn Rady).

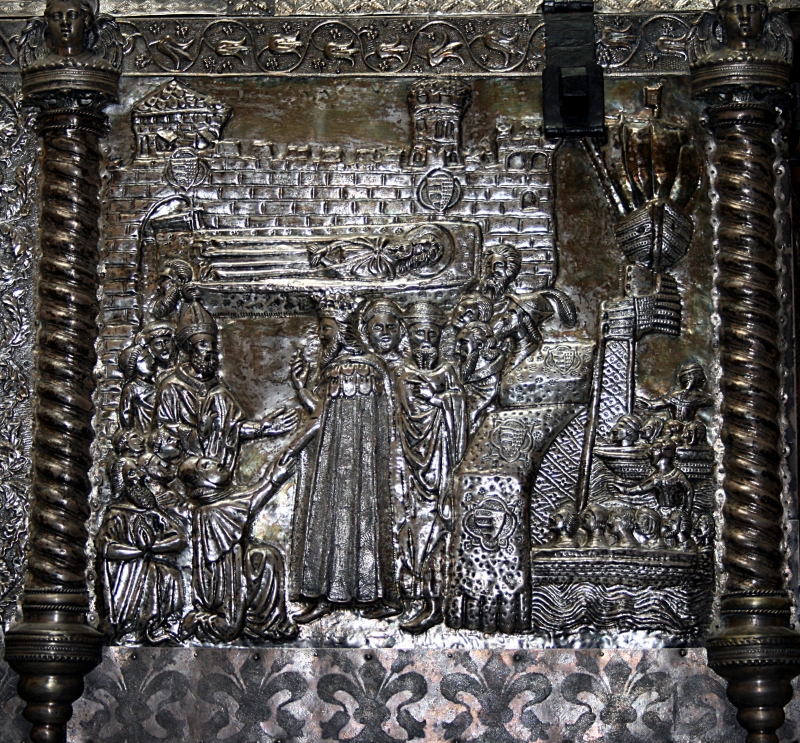
Louis I the Great in Zadar in Dalmatia

Most towns were still dominated by German merchants, but more and more Croat, Hungarian and Slovak peasants arrived from the nearby villages to settle in the towns in the 14th century. Louis I's Privilegium pro Slavis ("Privilege for the Slavs") from 1381 was the first indication of official bilingualism in a town. It ensured that the Slovaks in Zsolna (present-day Žilina, Slovakia) would enjoy the same privileges as the town's German burghers.

Louis I who was heir presumptive to Casimir III of Poland assisted the Poles several times against Lithuania and the Golden Horde. The foundation of Moldavia, a Romanian principality east of the Carpathians is also connected to these campaigns. Along the southern frontiers, Louis I compelled the Venetians to withdraw from Dalmatia in 1358 and forced a number of local rulers (including Tvrtko I of Bosnia, and Lazar of Serbia) to accept his suzerainty. However, his vassals often rebelled against him in the 1360s. Bogdan, a Romanian voivode even achieved the independence of Moldavia. Louis I's suzerainty over Moldavia was only restored when he was elected king of Poland in 1370.

His control over Wallachia, the other Romanian principality always remained doubtful. Vladislav I of Wallachia even allied with the emerging Ottoman Empire in 1375. Therefore, Louis I was the first Hungarian monarch who had to fight against the Ottomans.

Religious fanaticism is one of the featuring element of Louis I's reign. He attempted, without success, to convert many of his Orthodox subjects to Catholicism by force. He expelled the Jews around 1360, but allowed them to return in 1367.

New royal castles were erected, for instance, in Visegrád, Diósgyőr, and Zólyom (present-day Zvolen, Slovakia) under the Angevin kings. Patricians' houses unearthed at Sopron and other towns, frescoes and sculptures found at many places (including Esztergom and Nagyvárad) point at a flourishing Gothic architecture and art. Codices decorated with miniatures (among them the Illuminated Chronicle) attest to the high level of book illumination. William of Bergzabern, Bishop of Pécs founded a university at his see in 1367, but it was closed shortly after his death in 1375.

=== New consolidation (1382–1437) ===
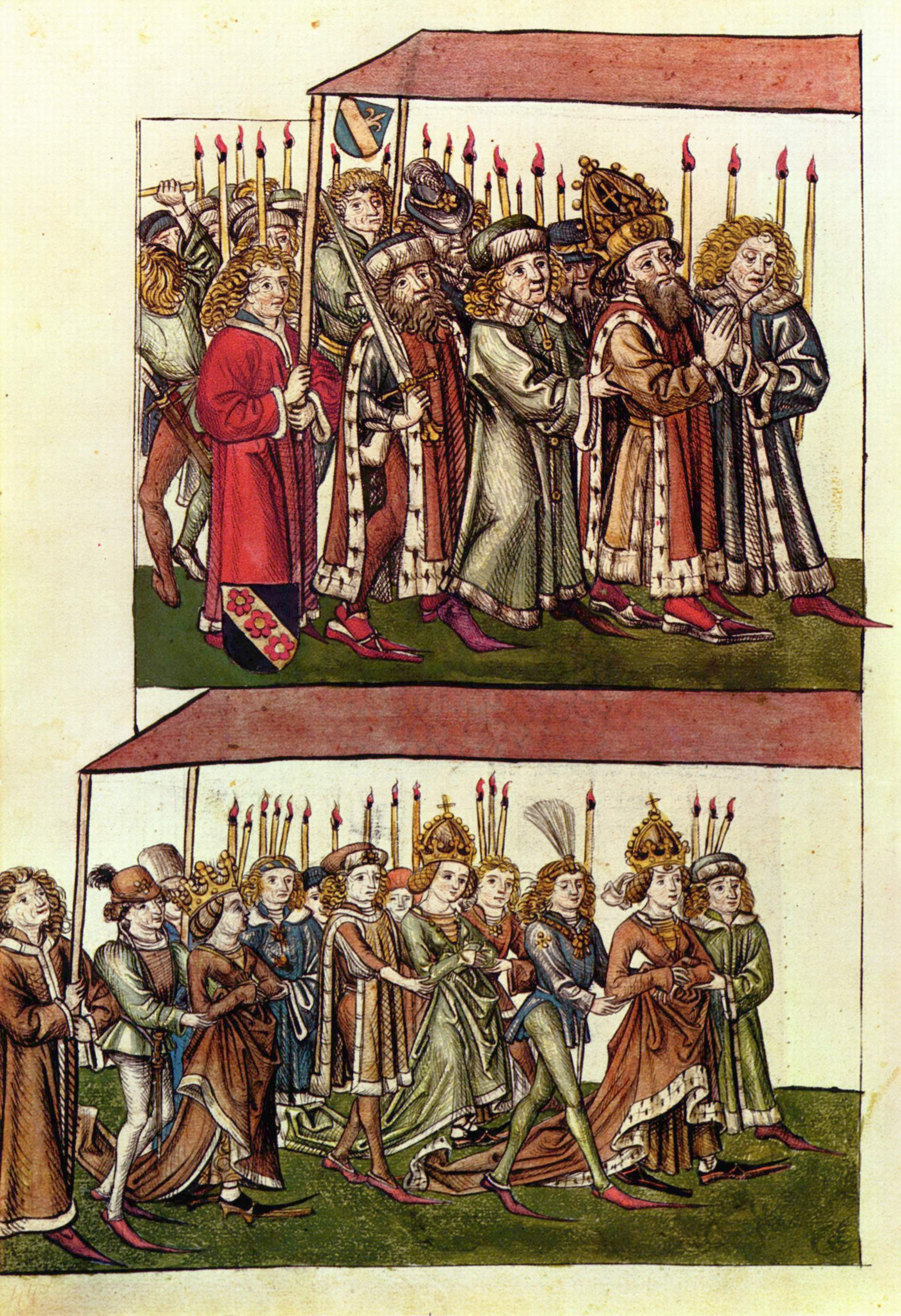
Sigismund of Luxemburg and his queen, Barbara of Cilli at the Council of Constance

Louis I was succeeded in 1382 by his daughter, Mary. However, most noblemen opposed the idea of being ruled by a female monarch. Taking advantage of the situation, a male member of the dynasty, Charles III of Naples claimed the throne for himself. He arrived in the kingdom in September 1385. Although the Diet forced the queen to abdicate and elected Charles of Naples king, the queen's partisans murdered him in February 1386. Paul Horvat, Bishop of Zagreb initiated a new rebellion and declared his infant son, Ladislaus of Naples king. They captured the queen in July 1386, but her supporters proposed the crown to her husband, Sigismund of Luxemburg. Queen Mary was soon liberated, but she never again intervened in the government.

Sigismund distributed more than 50 percent of the royal estates to his supporters. Furthermore, large territories in Croatia, Dalmatia and Slavonia remained controlled by Hrvoje Vukčić Hrvatinić and Ladislaus of Naples's other supporters. When Queen Mary died childless in 1395, her sister, Queen Jadwiga of Poland claimed the throne for herself, but Sigismund's partisans defeated her troops.

In the meantime, Stefan Lazarević of Serbia accepted the Ottoman sultan's suzerainty, thus the Ottoman Empire's expansion reached the southern frontiers of Hungary in 1390. Sigismund decided to organize a crusade against the Ottomans. A great army consisting mainly of French knights assembled, but the crusaders were routed in the battle of Nicopolis in 1396.

The Diet of Temesvár (present-day Timișoara, Romania) of 1397 obliged all landholders to finance the equipment of soldiers for defensive purposes. Thereafter, all landholders provided one archer for each twenty peasant households on their estates. In the same year, Sigismund abolished former immunities of the jurisdiction of county authorities which accelerated the development of county assemblies into important institutions of local autonomy.

Sigismund's open bias towards Stibor of Stiboricz, Hermann of Cilli and his (mostly foreign) favorites gave rise to a number of plots. Led by John Kanizsai, archbishop of Esztergom, the native barons even imprisoned him in 1401. For six months, the barons administered the realm in the name of the Holy Crown, "the impersonal sovereign of the kingdom" (Miklós Molnár), but finally restored Sigismund's rule. A group of barons offered the crown to Ladislaus of Naples in 1412, but Sigismund again gained the upper hand. Since Pope Boniface IX supported his opponent, Sigismund prohibited both the proclamation of papal documents without a previous royal consent and the appointment of prelates by the Holy See.

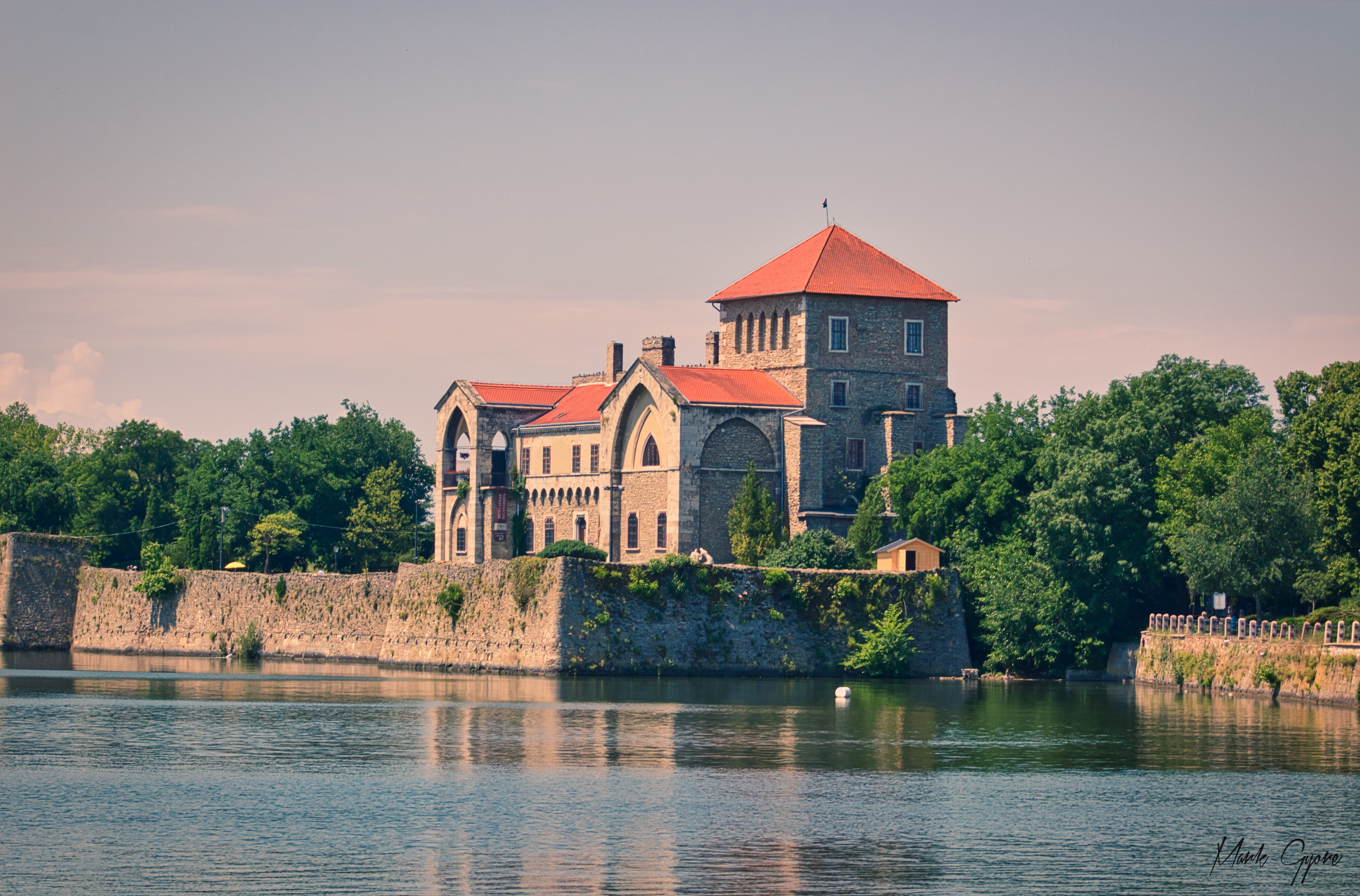
Sigismund's hunting castle at Tata

The major towns always remained faithful to Sigismund. He exempted many of them from internal custom duties and even invited their representatives to the Diet in 1405. However, the Diet was not convoked for three decades. The king spent more and more time abroad especially after his election King of the Romans in 1410. The kingdom was governed by his most faithful partisans who were united in a formal league, the Order of the Dragon.

This knightly order was established on the occasion of the royal troop's victory over Hrvoje Hrvatinić in 1408. Thereafter most Dalmatian towns seceded from Ladislaus of Naples, but he soon sold his claims to the Republic of Venice. In the following decade, the republic forced the settlements on the Dalmatian coasts one by one to accept her suzerainty.

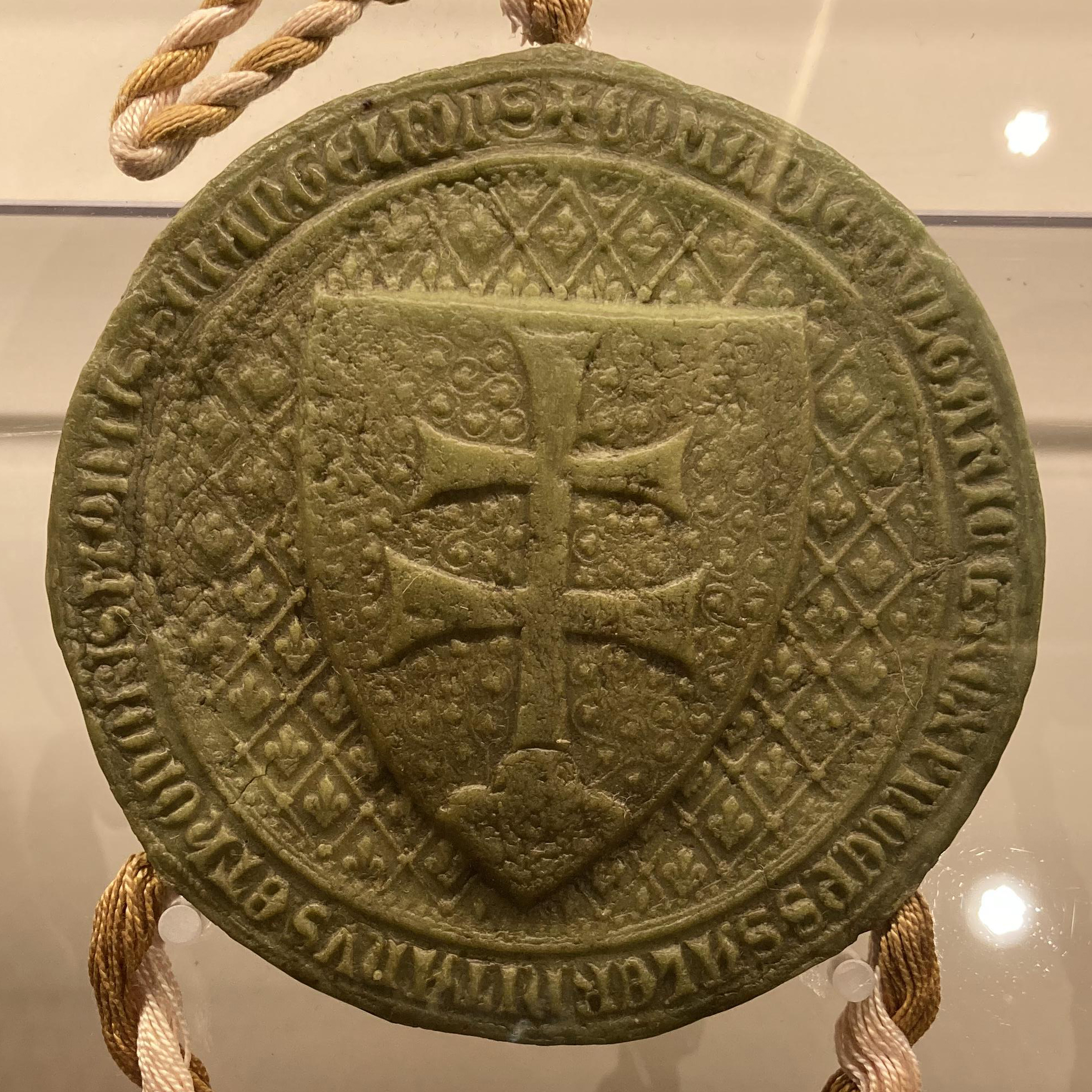
Reverse of the second double seal (1366-1382) of King Louis I the Great (1342-1382)

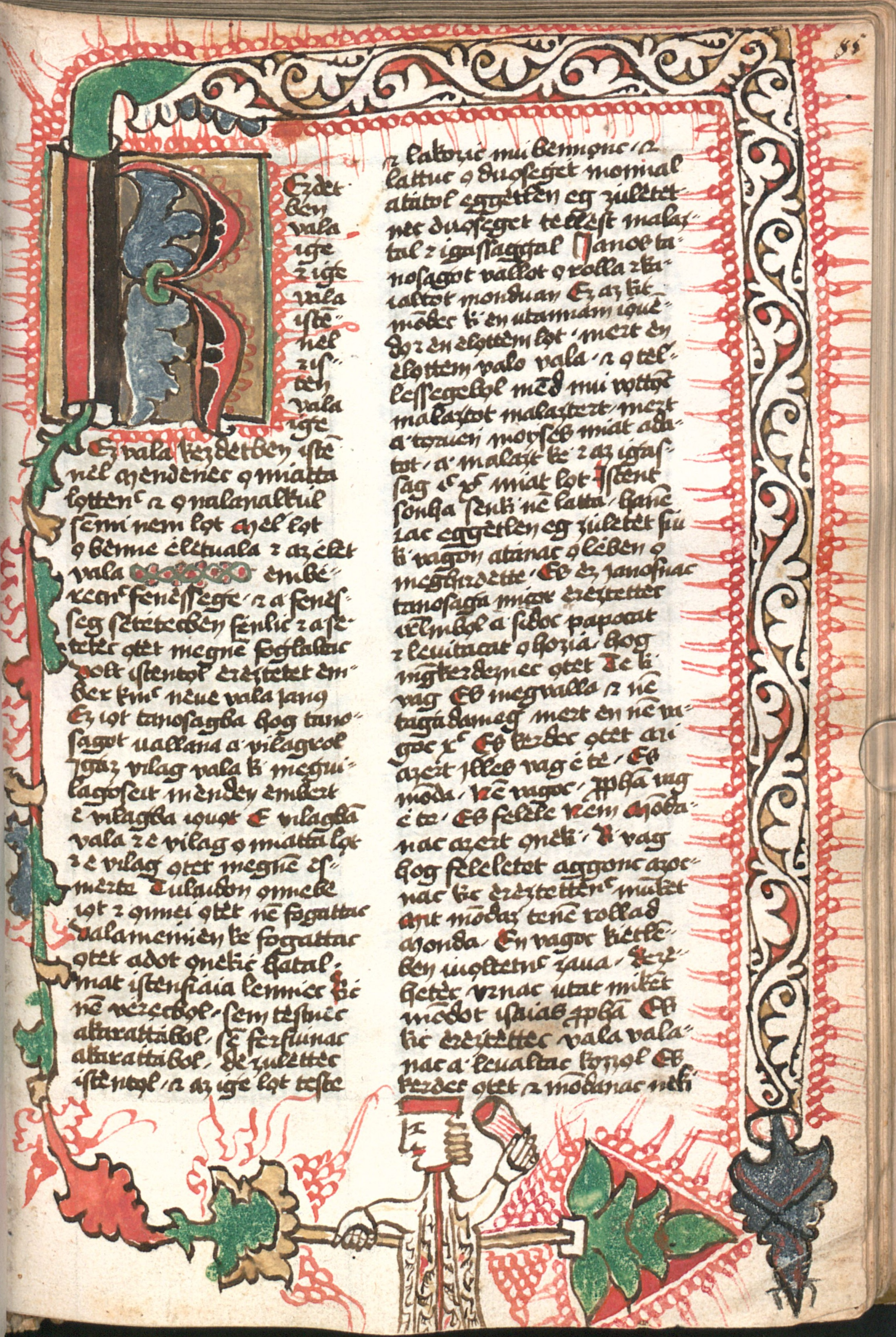
Munich Codex (1466): the first Hungarian translation of the Bible

On the southern borders, Sigismund attempted to create a buffer zone against the Ottomans. For this purpose, he granted large estates to Stefan Lazarević of Serbia, Mircea I of Wallachia and other neighboring rulers. Furthermore, fourteen new fortresses were erected on the Danube frontier under the auspices of the Italian Pipo of Ozora. The first Gypsy groups were also admitted in the kingdom because of their information on the Ottoman Empire's military and their skills in manufacturing weapons.

The Ottomans occupied Golubac Fortress in 1427 and started to regularly plunder the neighboring lands. The Ottoman raids forced many locals to depart for better protected regions. Their place was occupied by South Slavic refugees (mainly Serbs). Many of them were organized into mobile military units known as hussars.

The northern regions of the kingdom (present-day Slovakia) were pillaged in almost every year by Czech Hussites from 1428. However, Hussite ideas spread in the southern counties, mainly among the burghers of the Szerémség. Hussite preachers were also the first to translate the Bible to Hungarian. However, all Hussites were either executed or expelled from the Szerémség in the late 1430s.

Sigismund erected a splendid royal palace (later destroyed by the Ottomans) at Buda. Actually, the town became the kingdom's capital in his reign. The wealthiest landholders also constructed new residences or rebuilt their old fortresses in order to improve comfort. For instance, Pipo of Ozora who employed the painter Masolino da Panicale and one of Brunelleschi's students introduced Renaissance architecture and arts.

The kingdom's defense and Sigismund's active foreign policy demanded new sources of income. For instance, the king imposed "extraordinary" taxes on the prelates and mortgaged 13 Saxon towns in the Szepesség to Poland in 1412. He regularly debased coinage which resulted in a major rebellion of Hungarian and Romanian peasants in Transylvania in 1437. It was suppressed by the joint forces of the Hungarian noblemen, Székelys and Transylvanian Saxons who concluded an agreement against the rebels.

=== Age of the two Hunyadis (1437–1490) ===
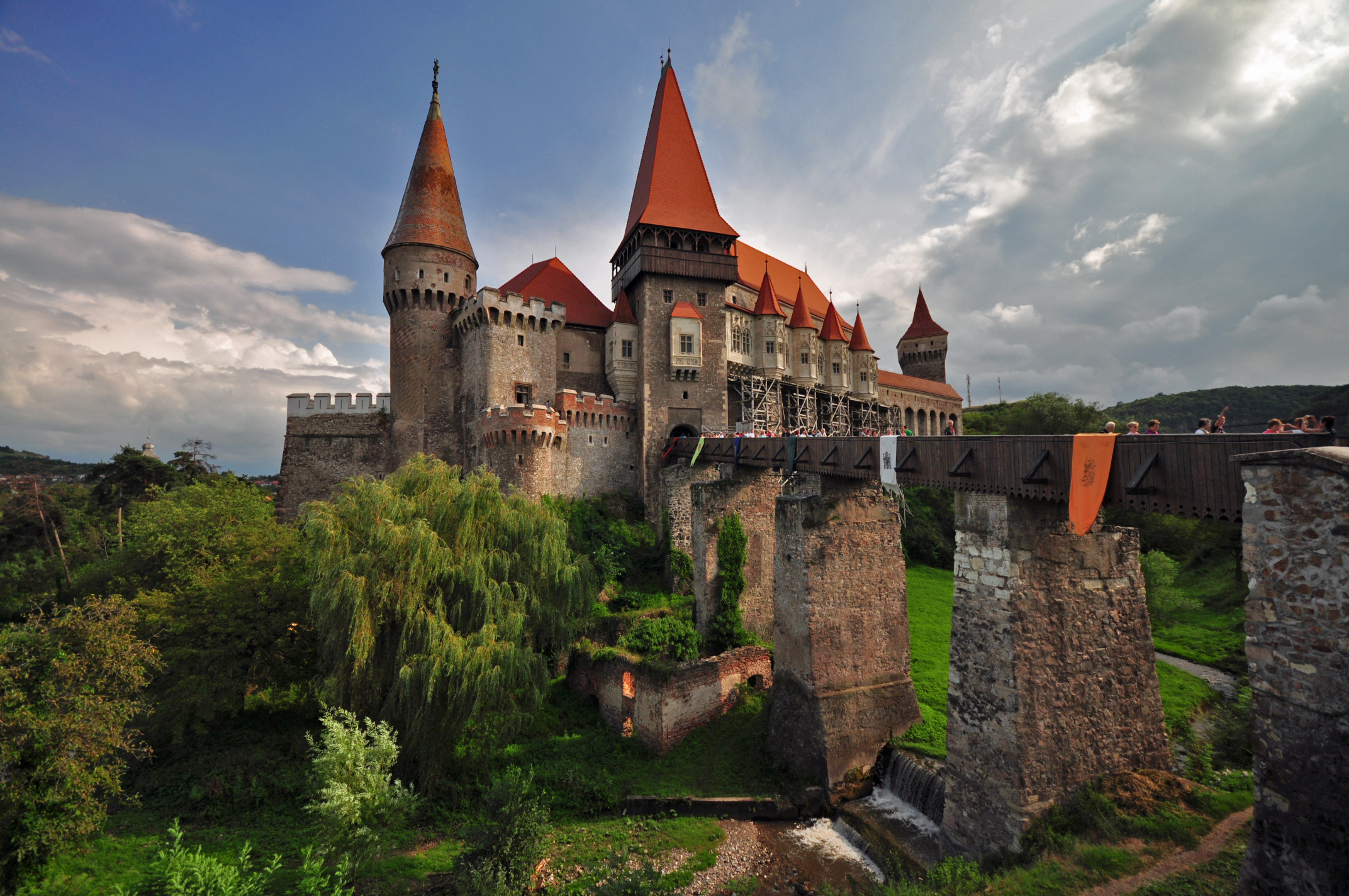
Hunyadi Castle at Vajdahunyad (present-day Hunedoara, Romania)

Sigismund, who had no sons, died in late 1437. The Estates elected his son-in-law, Albert V of Austria, king. Albert promised not to make any decisions without consulting the prelates and the lords. He died of dysentery during an unsuccessful military operation against the Ottomans in 1439.

Although Albert's widow, Elizabeth of Luxembourg, gave birth to a posthumous son, Ladislaus V, most noblemen preferred a monarch capable to fight. They offered the crown to Władysław III of Poland. Both Ladislaus and Władysław were crowned which caused a civil war. John Hunyadi, a talented military leader who supported Władysław, rose to prominence during these fights.

Władysław appointed Hunyadi (together with his close friend, Nicholas Újlaki) to command the southern defenses in 1441. Hunyadi made several raids against the Ottomans. During his "long campaign" of 1443-1444, the Hungarian forces penetrated as far as Sofia within the Ottoman Empire. The Holy See organized a new crusade, but the Ottomans annihilated the Christian forces at the Battle of Varna in 1444, during which Władysław was killed.

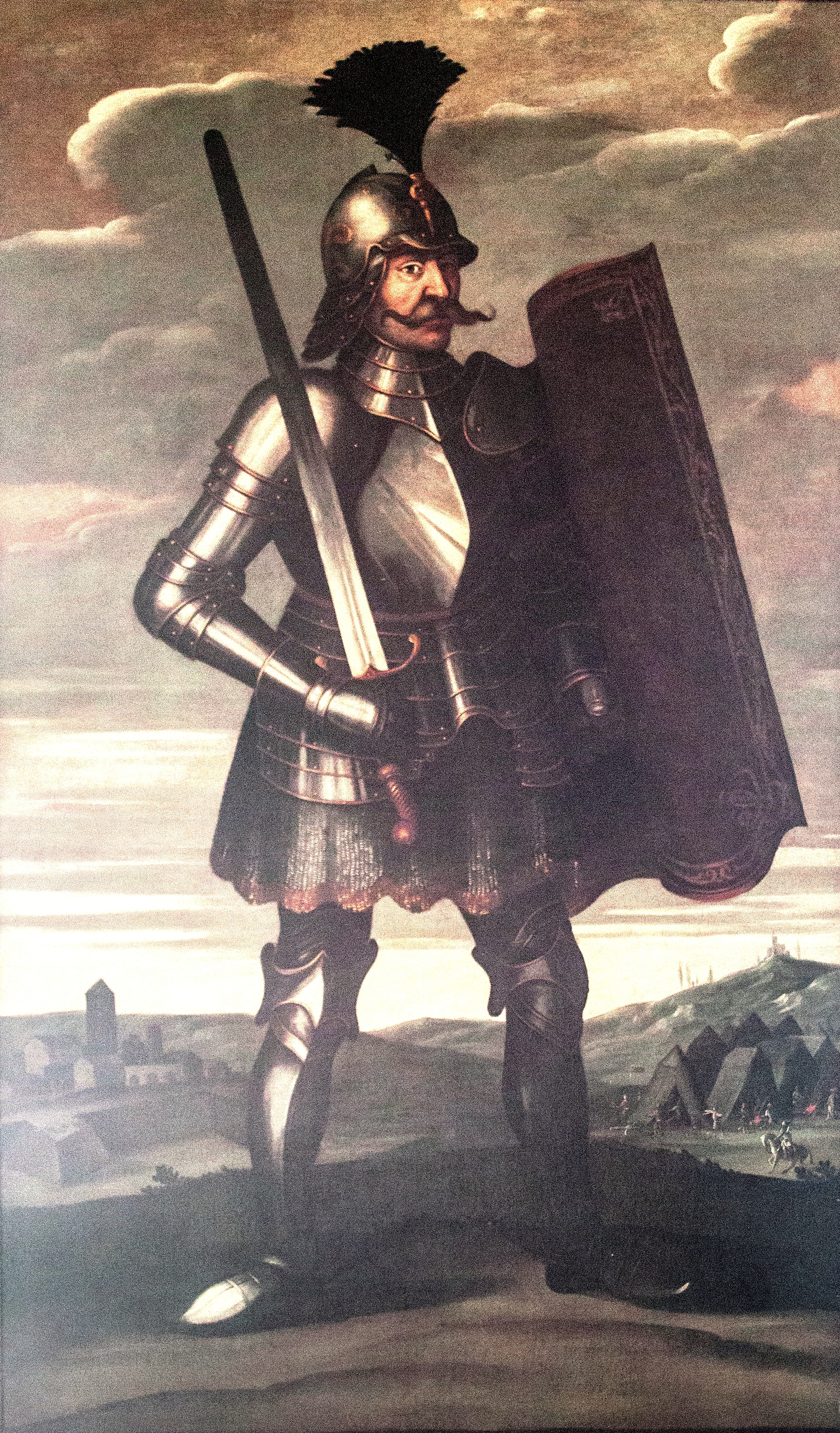
John Hunyadi, Regent-Governor of the Kingdom of Hungary

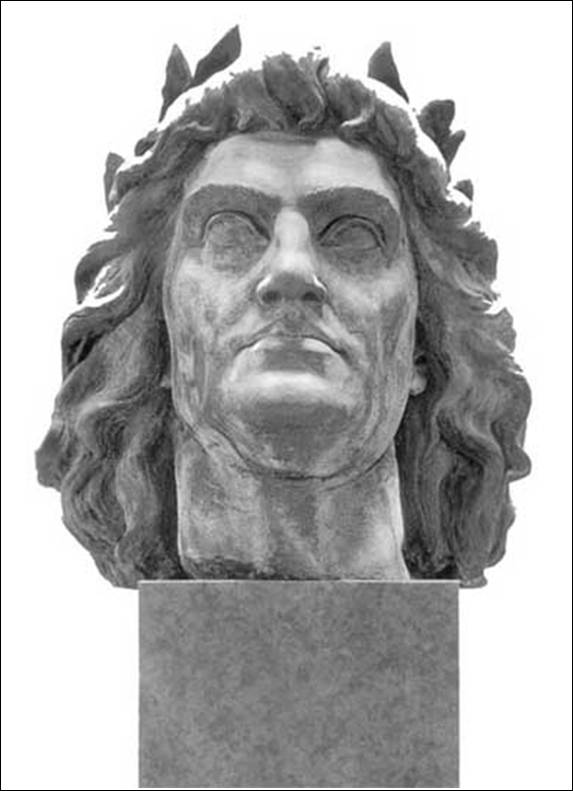
King Matthias the Just at around 50 years old (contemporary sculpture from Buda Castle)

Following Władysław's death, the Diet of 1445 acknowledged the infant Ladislaus V as rightful monarch. He lived in the court of his relative, Frederick III. Therefore, the Estates appointed seven "captains", one of them being Hunyadi, to govern the kingdom. The Diet of 1446 elected Hunyadi sole regent, but it was also stipulated that he should convoke the Diet annually. At the Diets, all official documents were issued and even speeches could be made in Latin. However, the German-speaking delegates from Pressburg (present-day Bratislava, Slovakia) reported already in 1446 that they could not understand the debates because the noblemen spoke in Hungarian.

Large territories remained independent of the central government in Hunyadi's regency. For instance, Frederick III held several towns along the western borders, and a Czech mercenary, John Jiskra of Brandýs, administered many fortresses in the northern regions. Even so, Hunyadi was planning to fight against the Ottomans in their own territories. However, his new campaign ended with the Christian forces' defeat at Kosovo in 1448.

Ladislaus V's Austrian and Bohemian subjects forced Emperor Frederick III to hand their young monarch over to his new guardian, Ulrich II, Count of Celje in 1452. Hunyadi also resigned from the regency, but he continued to administer a significant part of royal revenues and many royal fortresses. According to a contemporary proposal for the reform of royal revenues, more than 50 percent thereof (around 120,000 florins) derived from the royal monopoly on salt and a direct tax payable by the peasantry.

The fall of Constantinople in 1453 demonstrated the beginning of a new phase of Ottoman expansion under Sultan Mehmed II. In two years, he occupied Serbia and decided to take Belgrade (Hungarian: Nándorfehérvár), the key fort at Hungary's southern frontier. The defence was organized by John Hunyadi, who was assisted by the Franciscan preacher, John of Capistrano. They mobilized 25-30,000 commoners, cut the Ottomans' supply lines and forced them to withdraw on July 22, 1456. Hunyadi died in an epidemic in two weeks.

Ulrich of Celje ordered Hunyadi's elder son, Ladislaus, to hand over all royal castles held by his father. Ladislaus Hunyadi pretended to accept the command, but his retinue murdered Ulrich in Belgrade. He was arrested in March 1457, along with his younger brother Matthias, and subsequently executed. However, the execution stirred up the lesser nobility to revolt. Ladislaus V fled to Prague, where he died before the end of the year.

A diet was convoked and the assembled noblemen elected Matthias Hunyadi king in 1458. The young monarch in short time removed the powerful Ladislaus Garay from the office of palatine and his uncle, Michael Szilágyi, of the regency. Led by Garay, his opponents offered the crown to Frederick III, but Matthias defeated them and concluded a peace treaty with the emperor in 1464. In the meantime, the zone of buffer states along the kingdom's southern frontiers collapsed with the occupation of Serbia and Bosnia by the Ottomans. As an immediate consequence, a great number of Serbian refugees settled in the kingdom.

King Matthias introduced far-reaching fiscal and military reforms. First of all, peasants were in each year obliged to pay a lump-sum "extraordinary tax", often without the consent of the Diet. Traditional taxes were renamed in order to abolish earlier exemptions (for instance, the "thirtieth" was collected under the name "duty of the Crown" from 1467). Contemporary estimations suggest that his total yearly income was about 650,000 golden florins. More than 60 percent of his revenues (about 400,000 florins) derived from the "extraordinary tax", but salt monopoly and coinage still yielded significant income (60-80,000 florins).

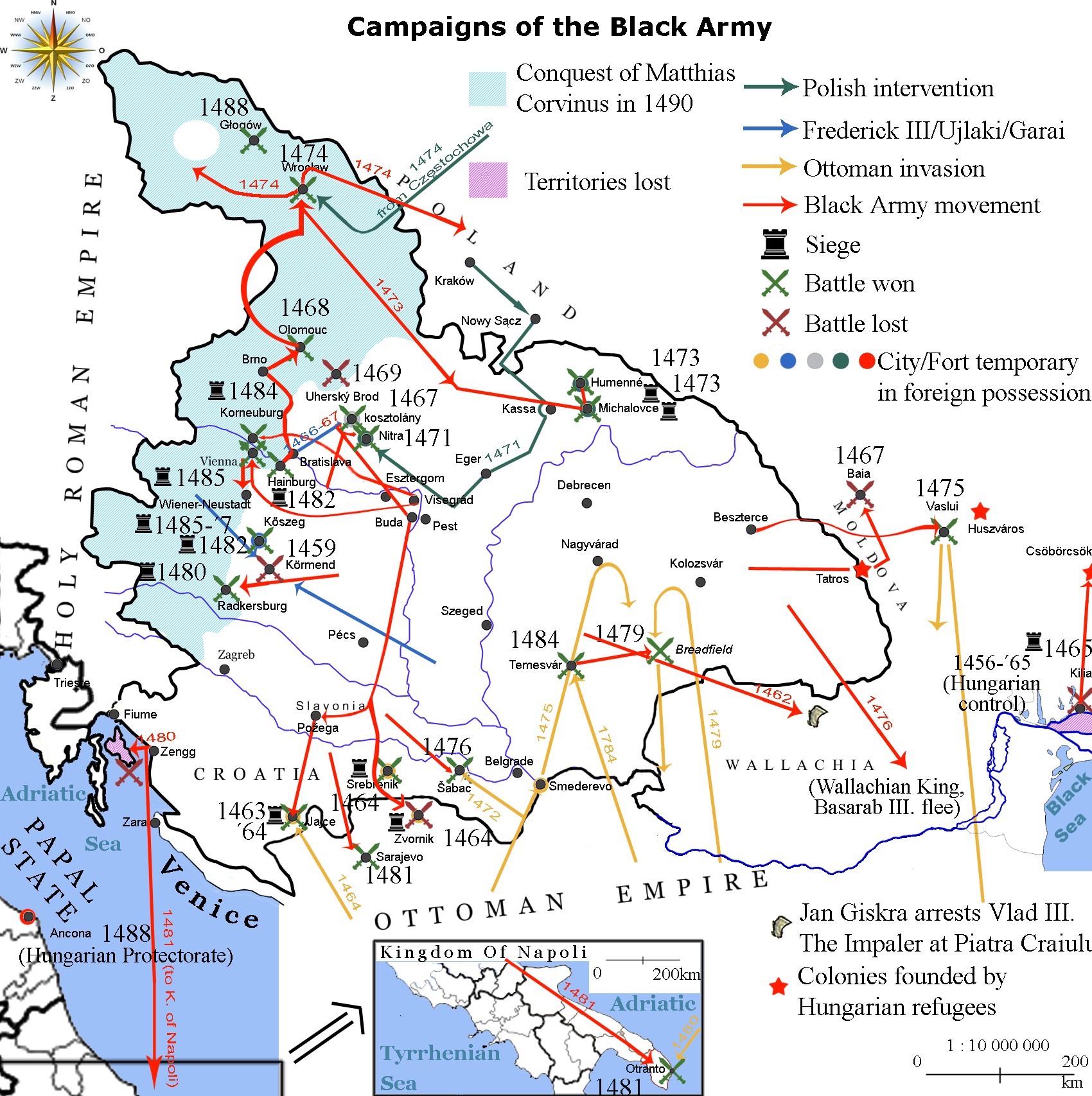
Campaigns of the "Black Army of Hungary"

Increased royal revenues enabled Matthias to set up and maintain a standing army. Consisting of mainly Czech, German and Hungarian mercenaries, his "Black Army" was one of the first professional military forces in Europe. Matthias strengthened the network of fortresses along the southern frontier, but he did not pursue his father's offensive anti-Ottoman policy. Instead, he launched attacks on Bohemia, Poland, and Austria, arguing that he was trying to forge an alliance strong enough to expel the Ottomans from Europe.

Although his war against the "heretic" king of Bohemia, George of Poděbrady, was supported by the Holy See, this reorientation of the kingdom's foreign policy was unpopular. Led by John Vitéz, archbishop of Esztergom, many of Matthias's former supporters rebelled against him in 1471. They offered the throne to Casimir, son of Casimir IV of Poland, but Matthias overcame them without difficulties. His war against Bohemia ended with the Peace of Olomouc of 1478 which confirmed his hold of Moravia, Silesia and Lusatia. In the next decade, Matthias waged a war against Emperor Frederick III which enabled him to occupy Styria and Lower Austria (including Vienna).

Matthias rarely convoked a Diet and governed by royal decrees after 1471. He preferred to employ lesser nobles and even commoners instead of aristocrats in state administration. His Decretum Maius of 1486 strengthened the authority of county magistrates by abolishing the palatine's right to convoke judicial assemblies in the counties and by annulling earlier immunities. King "Matthias the Just" travelling in disguise throughout his realm in order to suppress corruption became a hero of popular folk tales for some years after his death.

Matthias's court was "unquestionably among the most brilliant in Europe" (Miklós Molnár). His library, the Bibliotheca Corviniana with its 2,000 manuscripts, was the second greatest in size among contemporary book-collections. Matthias was the first monarch north of the Alps to introduce Italian Renaissance style in his realms. Inspired by his second wife, Beatrice of Naples, he had the royal palaces at Buda and Visegrád rebuilt under the auspices of Italian architects and artists after 1479.

=== Decline (1490–1526) ===
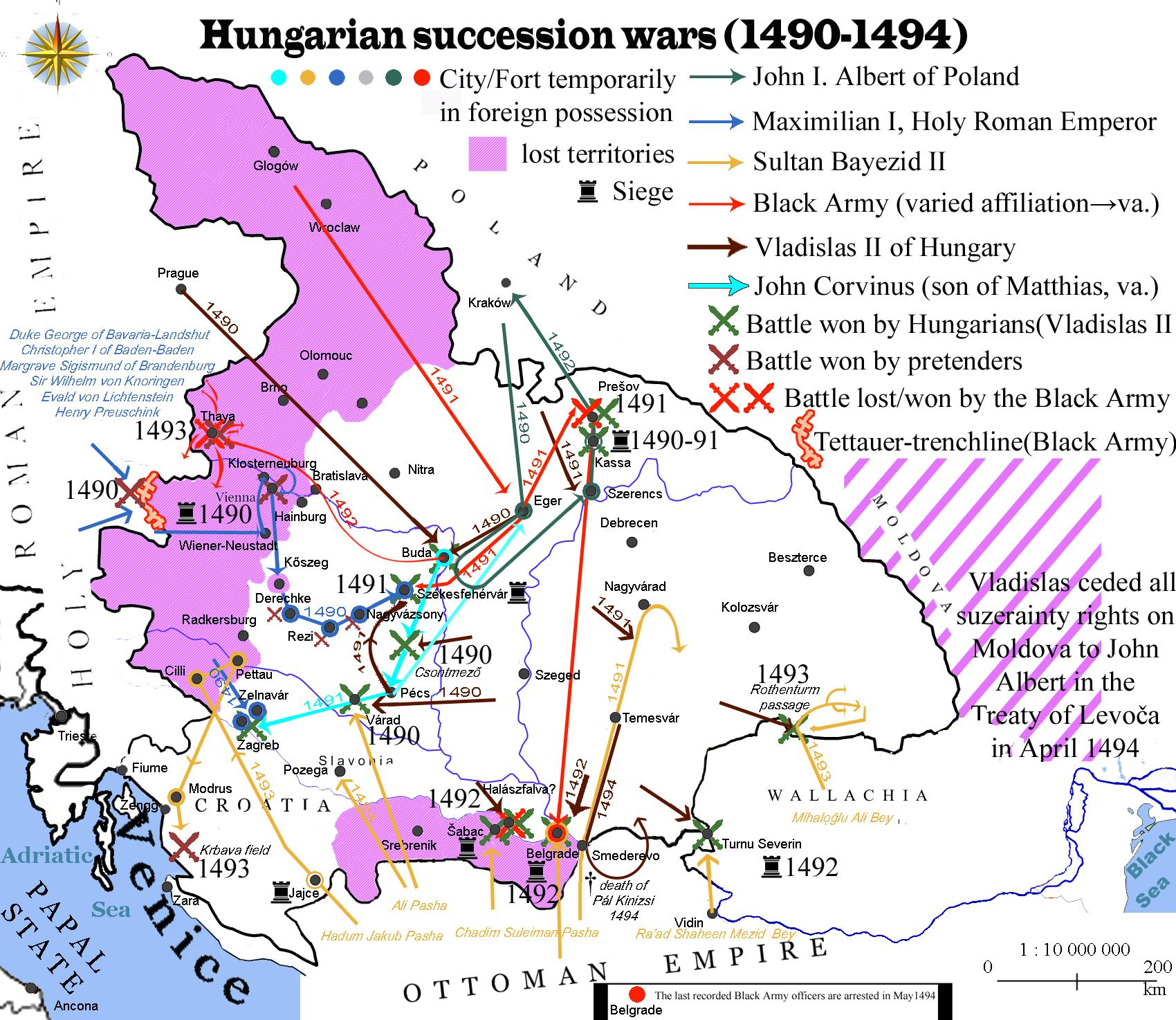
Events after the death of King Matthias

Matthias' reforms did not survive the turbulent decades that followed his death in 1490. An oligarchy of quarrelsome magnates gained control of Hungary. Not wanting another heavy-handed king, they procured the accession of Vladislaus II, the king of Bohemia and son of Casimir IV of Poland, precisely because of his notorious weakness: he was known as King Dobže, or Dobzse (meaning "all right"), from his habit of accepting, without question, every petition and document laid before him.

Vladislaus II donated most of the royal estates, régales and royalties to the nobility. By this method, the king tried to stabilize his new reign and preserve his popularity amongst the magnates. After the naïve fiscal and land policy of the royal court, the central power began to experience severe financial difficulties, largely due to the enlargement of feudal lands at his expense. The noble estate of the parliament succeeded in reducing the tax burden by 70-80 percent, at the expense of the country's ability to defend itself.

Vladislaus II also abolished the taxes that had supported Matthias' mercenary army. As a result, the king's army dispersed just as the Turks were threatening Hungary. The magnates also dismantled Mathias' administration and antagonized the lesser nobles. In 1492 the Diet limited the serfs' freedom of movement and expanded their obligations while a large portion of peasants became prosperous because of cattle-export to the West. Rural discontent boiled over in 1514 when well-armed peasants preparing for a crusade against Turks rose up under György Dózsa, a borderguard captain, and attacked estates across Hungary. United by a common threat, the magnates and lesser nobles eventually crushed the rebels. Dózsa and other rebel leaders were brutally executed.

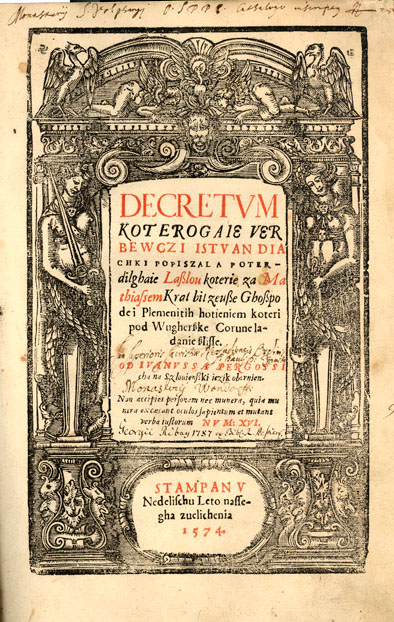
Werbőczy's influential work, the Tripartitum

Shocked by the peasant revolt, the Diet of 1514 passed laws that condemned the serfs to eternal bondage and increased their work obligations. Corporal punishment became widespread, and one noble even branded his serfs like livestock. The legal scholar István Werbőczy included the new laws in his Tripartitum of 1514, which made up the espirit of Hungary's legal corpus until the revolution of 1848. However, the Tripartitum was never used as a code. The Tripartitum gave Hungary's king and nobles, or magnates, equal shares of power: the nobles recognized the king as superior, but in turn the nobles had the power to elect the king. The Tripartitum also freed the nobles from taxation, obligated them to serve in the military only in a defensive war, and made them immune from arbitrary arrest.

When Vladislaus II died in 1516, his ten-year-old son Louis II became king, but a royal council appointed by the Diet ruled the country. Hungary was in a state of near anarchy under the magnates' rule. The king's finances were a shambles; he borrowed to meet his household expenses despite the fact that they totaled about one-third of the national income. The country's defenses sagged as border guards went unpaid, fortresses fell into disrepair, and initiatives to increase taxes to reinforce defenses were stifled. In 1521 Sultan Suleiman the Magnificent recognized Hungary's weakness and seized Belgrade in preparation for an attack on Hungary.

==== Battle of Mohács (1526) ====
Following the fall of Belgrade, Louis II and his wife, Mary of Habsburg, tried to manage an anti-magnate putsch, but were not successful. In August 1526, the Ottomans under Suleiman appeared in southern Hungary, and he marched nearly 100,000 Turkish-Islamic troops into Hungary's heartland. The Hungarian army, numbering around 26,000, met the Turks at Mohács. Though the Hungarian troops were well-equipped and well-trained, they lacked a good military leader, while reinforcements from Croatia and Transylvania did not arrive in time. They were utterly defeated, with up to 20,000 killed on the field, while Louis himself died when he fell from his horse into a bog.

==== Partitioning (1526–1541) ====
After Louis's death, the rival factions of Hungarian nobles simultaneously elected two kings, John Zápolya and Ferdinand of Habsburg. Each claimed sovereignty over the entire country but lacked sufficient forces to eliminate his rival. Zápolya, a Hungarian who was military governor of Transylvania, was recognized by Sultan Suleiman and was supported mostly by lesser nobles opposed to new foreign kings. Zápolya's realm also became an Ottoman vassal in 1529 when he swore fealty to Suleiman. Ferdinand drew support from magnates in western Hungary who hoped he could convince his brother, Holy Roman Emperor Charles V, to expel the Turks. In 1538 George Martinuzzi, Zápolya's adviser, arranged an agreement between the rivals, known as the Treaty of Nagyvárad, that would have made Ferdinand sole monarch upon the death of the then-childless Zápolya. The agreement failed when, just before his death in 1540, Zápolya married and fathered a son, John Sigismund Zápolya. Violence erupted, and the Turks seized the opportunity, conquering the city of Buda and then partitioning the country in 1541.

== See also ==
- List of Hungarian rulers
- Bulgarian–Hungarian wars
- Ottoman–Hungarian wars
- Reformation in the Kingdom of Hungary
- Union of Hungary and Poland

== Sources ==
=== Primary sources ===
- Anonymus, Notary of King Béla: The Deeds of the Hungarians (Edited, Translated and Annotated by Martyn Rady and László Veszprémy) (2010). In: Rady, Martyn; Veszprémy, László; Bak, János M. (2010); Anonymus and Master Roger; CEU Press; ISBN 978-9639776951.
- Master Roger's Epistle to the Sorrowful Lament upon the Destruction of the Kingdom of Hungary by the Tatars (Translated and Annotated by János M. Bak and Martyn Rady) (2010). In: Rady, Martyn; Veszprémy, László; Bak, János M. (2010); Anonymus and Master Roger; CEU Press; ISBN 978-9639776951.
- The Deeds of Frederick Barbarossa by Otto of Freising and his continuator, Rahewin (Translated and annotated with an introduction by Charles Christopher Mierow, with the collaboration of Richard Emery) (1953). Columbia University Press. ISBN 0-231-13419-3.
- The Laws of the Medieval Kingdom of Hungary, 1000–1301 (Translated and Edited by János M. Bak, György Bónis, James Ross Sweeney with an essay on previous editions by Andor Czizmadia, Second revised edition, In collaboration with Leslie S. Domonkos) (1999). Charles Schlacks, Jr. Publishers.

=== Secondary sources ===
- This article incorporates text from a publication now in the public domain: Bain, Robert Nisbet (1911). "Dozsa, György". In Chisholm, Hugh (ed.). Encyclopædia Britannica. Vol. 8 (11th ed.). Cambridge University Press. p. 462.
- Bak, János M. (1993). "Linguistic pluralism" in Medieval Hungary. In: The Culture of Christendom: Essays in Medieval History in Memory of Denis L. T. Bethel (Edited by Marc A. Meyer); The Hambledon Press; ISBN 1-85285-064-7.
- Bak, János (1994). The late medieval period, 1382–1526. In: Sugár, Peter F. (General Editor); Hanák, Péter (Associate Editor); Frank, Tibor (Editorial Assistant); A History of Hungary; Indiana University Press; ISBN 0-253-20867-X.
- Berend, Nora (2006). At the Gate of Christendom: Jews, Muslims and "Pagans" in Medieval Hungary, c.1000 – c.1300. Cambridge University Press. ISBN 978-0-521-02720-5.
- Crowe, David M. (2007). A History of the Gypsies of Eastern Europe and Russia. PALGRAVE MACMILLAN. ISBN 978-1-4039-8009-0.
- Curta, Florin (2006). Southeastern Europe in the Middle Ages, 500–1250. Cambridge: Cambridge University Press. ISBN 978-0-521-81539-0.
- Engel, Pál (2001). The Realm of St Stephen: A History of Medieval Hungary, 895–1526. I.B. Tauris Publishers. ISBN 1-86064-061-3.
- Fine, John V. A. Jr. (1991) [1983]. The Early Medieval Balkans: A Critical Survey from the Sixth to the Late Twelfth Century. Ann Arbor: University of Michigan Press. ISBN 0-472-08149-7.
- Fine, John V. A. (1994) [1987]. The Late Medieval Balkans: A Critical Survey from the Late Twelfth Century to the Ottoman Conquest. Ann Arbor, Michigan: University of Michigan Press. ISBN 978-0-472-10079-8.
- Georgescu, Vlad (1991). The Romanians: A History. Ohio State University Press. ISBN 0-8142-0511-9.
- Goldstein, Ivo (1999). Croatia: A History (Translated from the Croatian by Nikolina Jovanović). McGill-Queen's University Press. ISBN 978-0-7735-2017-2.
- Johnson, Lonnie (2011). Central Europe: Enemies, Neighbors, Friends. Oxford University Press.
- Kirschbaum, Stanislav J. (2005). A History of Slovakia: The Struggle for Survival. Palgrave. ISBN 1-4039-6929-9.
- Kontler, László (1999). Millennium in Central Europe: A History of Hungary. Atlantisz Publishing House. ISBN 963-9165-37-9.
- Makkai, László (1994). The Hungarians' prehistory, their conquest of Hungary and their raids to the West to 955 and The foundation of the Hungarian Christian state, 950–1196. In: Sugár, Peter F. (General Editor); Hanák, Péter (Associate Editor); Frank, Tibor (Editorial Assistant); A History of Hungary; Indiana University Press; ISBN 0-253-20867-X.
- Molnár, Miklós (2001). A Concise History of Hungary. Cambridge University Press. ISBN 978-0-521-66736-4.
- Pataki, József (August 1971). "Dózsa György életútjáról" [On the Life Journey of György Dózsa] (PDF). Korunk (in Hungarian). 30 (8): 1147–1155 – via EPA OSZK.
- Rady, Martyn (2000). Nobility, Land and Service in Medieval Hungary. Palgrave (in association with School of Slavonic and East European Studies, University College London). ISBN 0-333-80085-0.
- Reuter, Timothy, ed. (2000). The New Cambridge Medieval History, Volume 3, c.900–c.1024. Cambridge: Cambridge University Press. ISBN 978-1-13905572-7.
- Sedlar, Jean W. (1994). East Central Europe in the Middle Ages, 1000–1500. University of Washington Press. ISBN 0-295-97290-4.
- Spiesz, Anton; Caplovic, Dusan; Bolchazy, Ladislaus J. (2006). Illustrated Slovak History: A Struggle for Sovereignty in Central Europe. Bolchazy-Carducci Publishers. ISBN 978-0-86516-426-0.
- Spinei, Victor (2003). The Great Migrations in the East and South East of Europe from the Ninth to the Thirteenth Century (Translated by Dana Bădulescu). ISBN 973-85894-5-2.
- Zupka, Dušan (2014). Urban Rituals and Literacy in the Medieval Kingdom of Hungary. In: Using the Written Word in Medieval Towns: Varieties of Medieval Urban Literacy II. ed. Marco Mostert and Anna Adamska. Utrecht Studies in Medieval Literacy 28. Turhnout, Brepols, 2014. ISBN 978-2-503-54960-6.
