= Treaty of Brno =

Treaty of Brno may refer to:

- Treaty of Brno (1478)
- Treaty of Brno (1920)
