= Tisem =

- Municipality
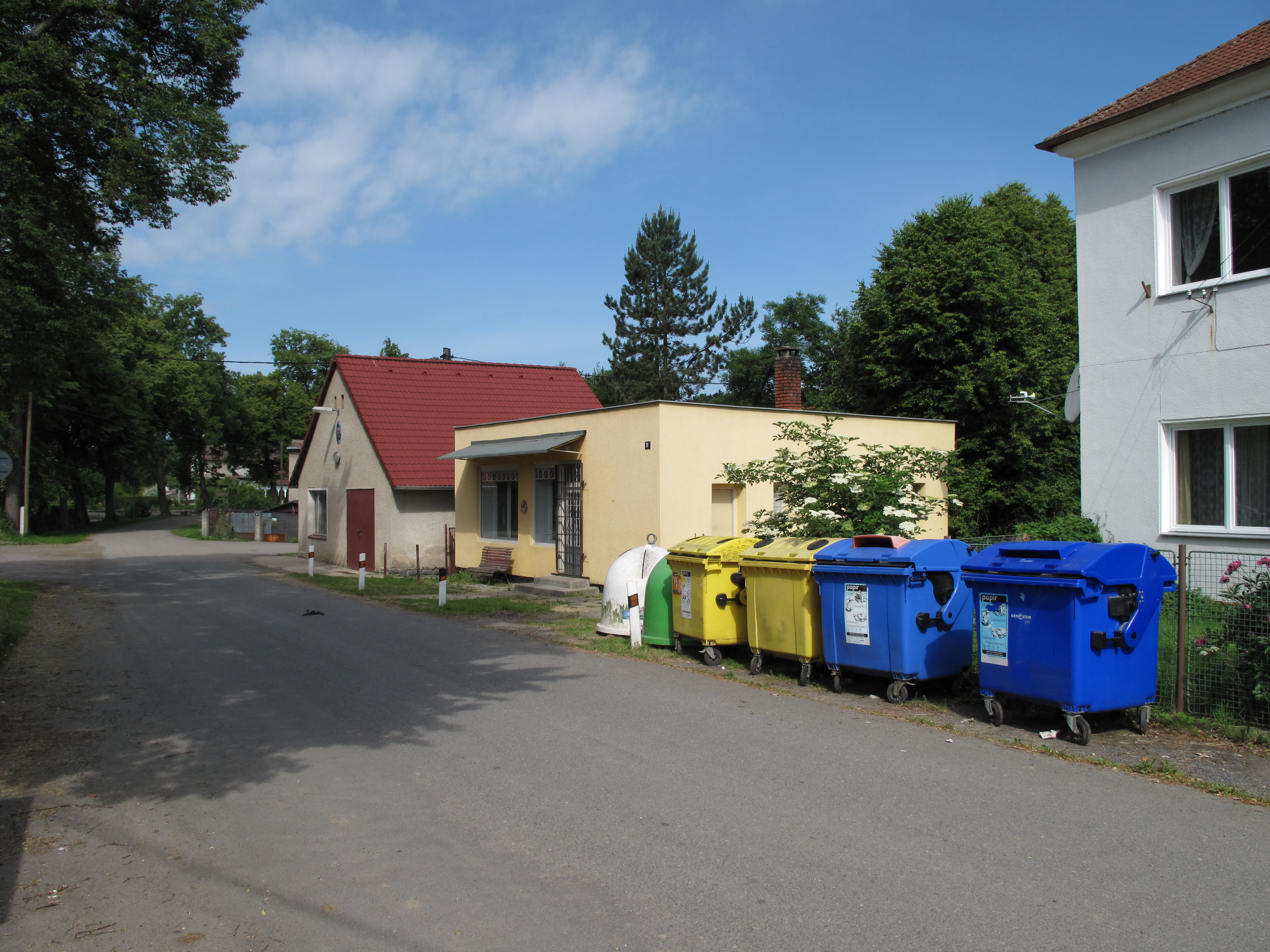
- A street in Tisem

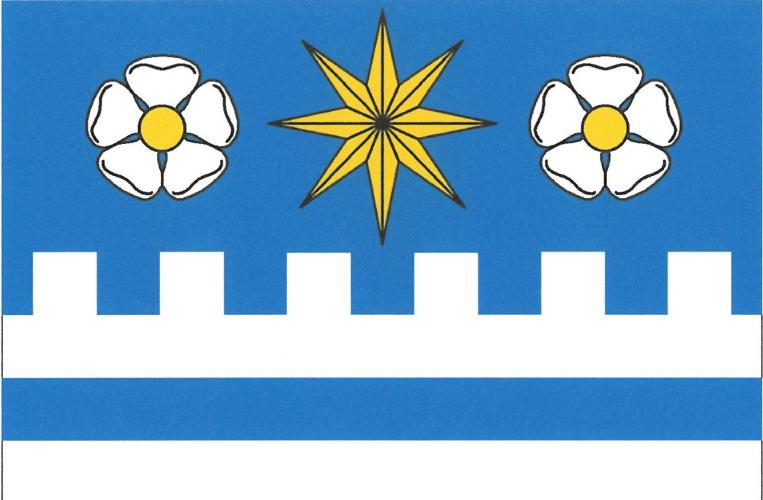
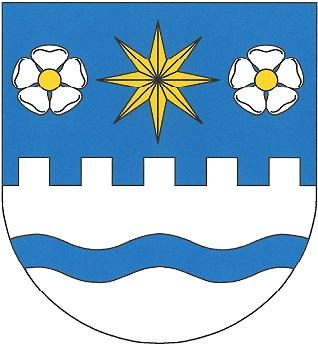
- Flag Coat of arms

- Location in the Czech Republic
- Coordinates: 49°45′21″N 14°36′29″E
- Country: Czech Republic
- Region: Central Bohemian
- District: Benešov
- First mentioned: 1325

Area
  - Total: 3.46 km^{2} (1.34 sq mi)
- Elevation: 348 m (1,142 ft)

Population (2026-01-01)
  - Total: 219
  - Density: 63.3/km^{2} (164/sq mi)
- Time zone: UTC+1 (CET)
  - Summer (DST): UTC+2 (CEST)
- Postal code: 257 56
- Website: www.tisem.cz

Tisem is a municipality and village in Benešov District in the Central Bohemian Region of the Czech Republic. It has about 200 inhabitants.

== Etymology ==
The name is derived from the personal name Tisem, meaning "Tisem's (court)".

== Geography ==
Tisem is located about 6 kilometres (4 mi) southwest of Benešov and 32 km (20 mi) south of Prague. It lies in a hilly landscape of the Benešov Uplands. The highest point is at 410 m (1,350 ft) above sea level.

== History ==
The first written mention of Tisem is from 1325.

== Demographics ==
Historical population

Year	Pop.	±%
1869	233	—
1880	250	+7.3%
1890	259	+3.6%
1900	296	+14.3%
1910	276	−6.8%

Year	Pop.	±%
1921	298	+8.0%
1930	281	−5.7%
1950	212	−24.6%
1961	199	−6.1%
1970	170	−14.6%

Year	Pop.	±%
1980	167	−1.8%
1991	169	+1.2%
2001	189	+11.8%
2011	218	+15.3%
2021	236	+8.3%

Source: Censuses

== Transport ==
There are no railways or major roads passing through the municipality.

== Sights ==
The most important monument is the ruin of the Kožlí Castle, located in the northeastern tip of the municipal territory. First mentioned in 1318, it was built in the first quarter of the 14th century. The castle was probably destroyed during the time of the Bohemian–Hungarian War (1468–1478). Several remains of perimeter walls and palace buildings have survived to this day. In the area of the castle ruin is also a small chapel from the 19th century.
