= Virgin Mary Monument, Timișoara =

Part of a national heritage site in Timișoara, Romania

Virgin Mary Monument
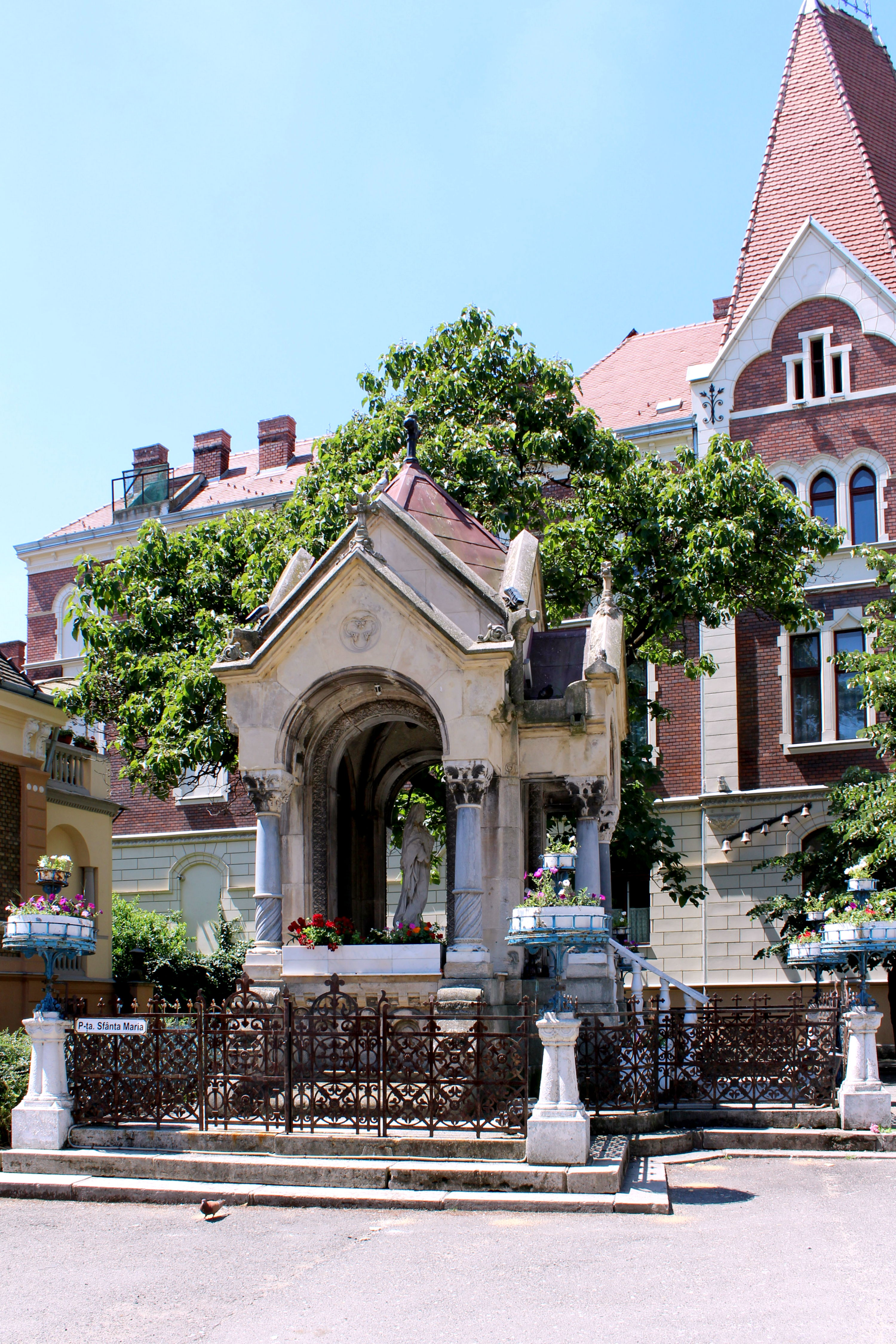
- Location: St. Mary Square, Timișoara
- Coordinates: 45°44′53″N 21°13′7″E
- Designer: László Székely
- Material: Carrara marble
- Completion date: 1906
- Restored date: 2012

Virgin Mary Monument is located in Timișoara's St. Mary Square and it has been there since 1906, when it was built on an older statue of Virgin Mary. The legend goes that György Dózsa has been executed there. The monument is a romanesque style canopy set on six pillars, under which lies the statue of Mary, carved in Carrara marble. The monument is part of the old Iosefin district, inscribed in the list of historical monuments with the code TM-II-s-B-06098.

== History ==
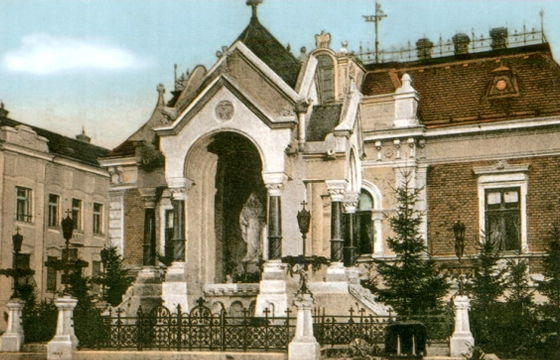
Virgin Mary Monument in 1910

In 1514 there was a revolt against the nobility led by the Szekler György Dózsa. The serfs were forbidden to enlist in the crusader army, as leaving the lands would have severely affected the Hungarian nobility. Thus, they revolted. However, György Dózsa's peasant army was defeated at the gates of the Timișoara Fortress and he was captured. Dózsa was burned alive, sitting on a reddened throne and wearing a hot iron crown. Legend goes that during György Dózsa's execution, the Jesuits, who were chanting religious songs, saw Virgin Mary's figure in the smoke, which was considered a miracle. An icon of Virgin Mary was placed there, on a pillar, in a glass-framed box, to mark the event. It was kept there while Timișoara was occupied by the Turks (for 164 years) and long after that. After the liberation of the city in 1716, the Jesuits organized processions there. The icon was accidentally broken by a carter who came to the fair. Bishop Joseph Lonovics raised money to replace the icon with a wood-carved one. In 1865, this icon-statue was replaced with a Bavarian stone statue. In 1877 the nuns of the School Sisters of Notre Dame brought a statue from the Mayer'sche Hofkunstanstalt in Munich at their expense. At the beginning of the 20th century, the Timișoara City Hall decided to restore the monument. It was built in 1906 according to a project by László Székely, and the statue of Virgin Mary was made by sculptor György Kiss. The monument cost between 13,571 krones (about 4 kg of gold) and 23,000 krones, depending on the source asked. The inauguration was on 16 December 1906. Bishop József Németh, mayor Carol Telbisz, prime notary Joseph Geml, architect László Székely and sculptor György Kiss attended the ceremony.

=== Destructions and restorations ===
After World War I, the word "Hungarians" was removed from the inscription behind the monument.

On the night of 11/12 January 2012, the statue was vandalized, being knocked down from the pedestal and deteriorated. The face was disfigured, the nose and mouth broken, as well as the hands. The Christ Child's face, shoulder and hand were broken, and some other details too. The restoration has been made between 12 March and 21 May 2012 by artist Ion Oprescu, specialist in stone restoration at Museum of Banat. Carrara marble has been used for the restoration. The restoration cost was of 30,000 lei. The restored statue was unveiled on 24 May 2012.

== Description ==
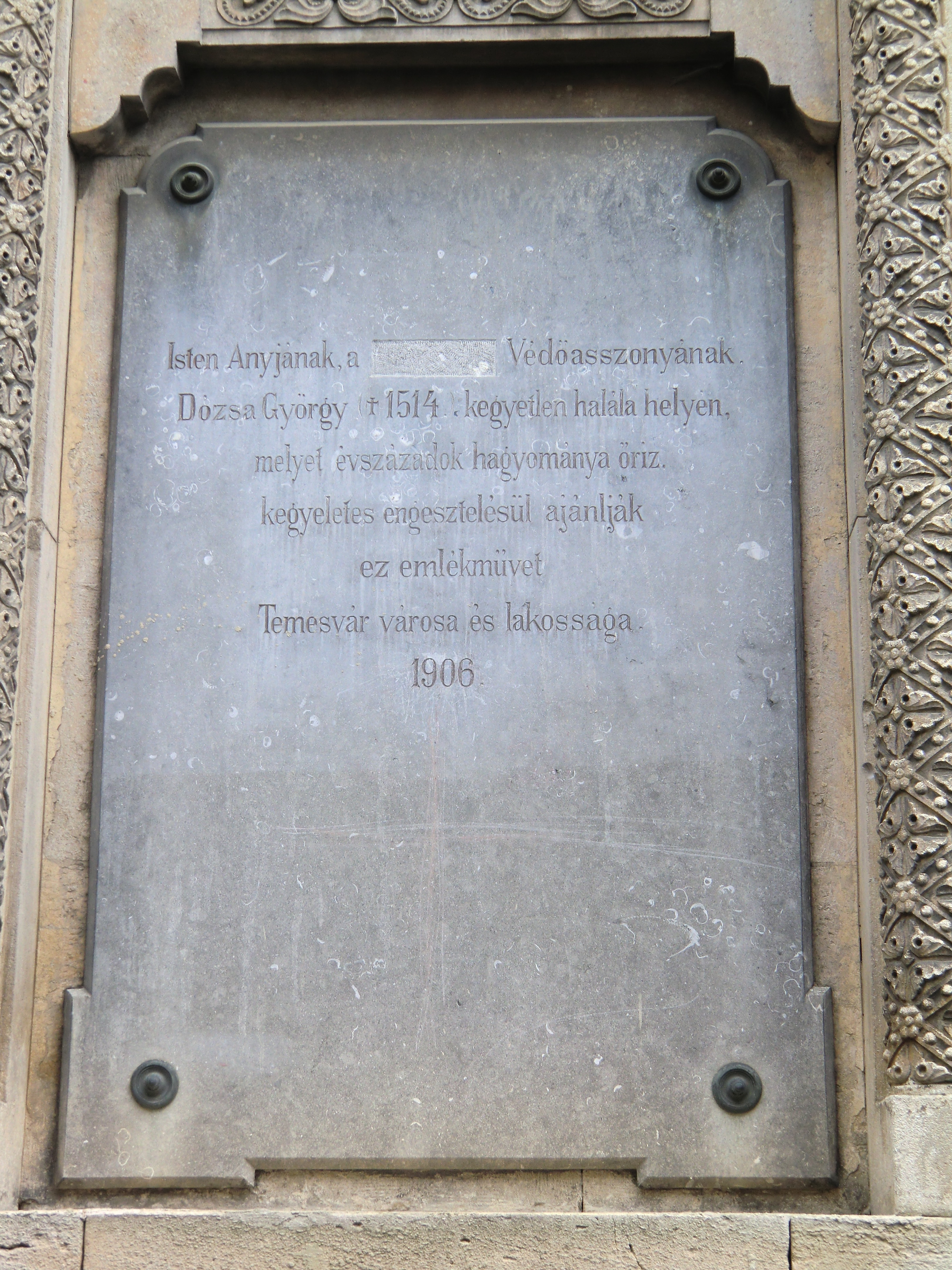
The Hungarian inscription behind the chapel

The monument is a romanesque style chapel, with a sandstone canopy set on six pillars of Belgian granite with white marble capitals. The statue is made of Carrara marble and represents the Virgin Mary holding the Christ Child. The 1.55-meter-high statue stands on a pedestal.

The following inscription is written behind the chapel:

Isten Anyjának, a [magyarok] Védőasszonyának. Dózsa György († 1514) kegyetlen halála helyén, melyet évszázadok hagyománya őriz, kegyeletes engesztelésül ajánlják ez emlékművet Temesvár városa és lakossága. 1906.

Translation:

To the Mother of God, the Patroness of the [Hungarians]. On the site of the cruel death of György Dózsa († 1514), which has been preserved for centuries, the city and the people of Timișoara offer this monument as a pious atonement. 1906.
