= Treaty of Brno (1478) =

1478 treaty between Hungary and Bohemia

The Treaty of Brno was a draft to the Peace of Olomouc developed in March 1478 in Brno by the envoys of Matthias Corvinus of Hungary and King Vladislaus II of Bohemia and Hungary in an effort to end the Bohemian–Hungarian War (1468–1478). Corvinus accepted the accord and slightly modified it on 20 September 1478, which determined the division of Bohemian territories. Based on the terms of the treaty, Vladislaus would cede the territories of Moravia, Silesia, and Lusatia to Corvinus. If Matthias perished, then Vladislaus was permitted to redeem these lands for 400,000 florins. Moreover, both monarchs would be permitted to utilize the title King of Bohemia. However, only Matthias was required to address the other claimant as the King of Bohemia.

== See also ==
- List of treaties
- Peace of Olomouc

== Sources ==
- Engel, Pál (translated by Tamas Palosfalvi). The Realm of St Stephen: A History of Medieval Hungary, 895-1526. I.B. Tauris, 2005. ISBN 1-85043-977-X.
