= György Dózsa =

Leader of the 1514 Hungarian peasants' revolt

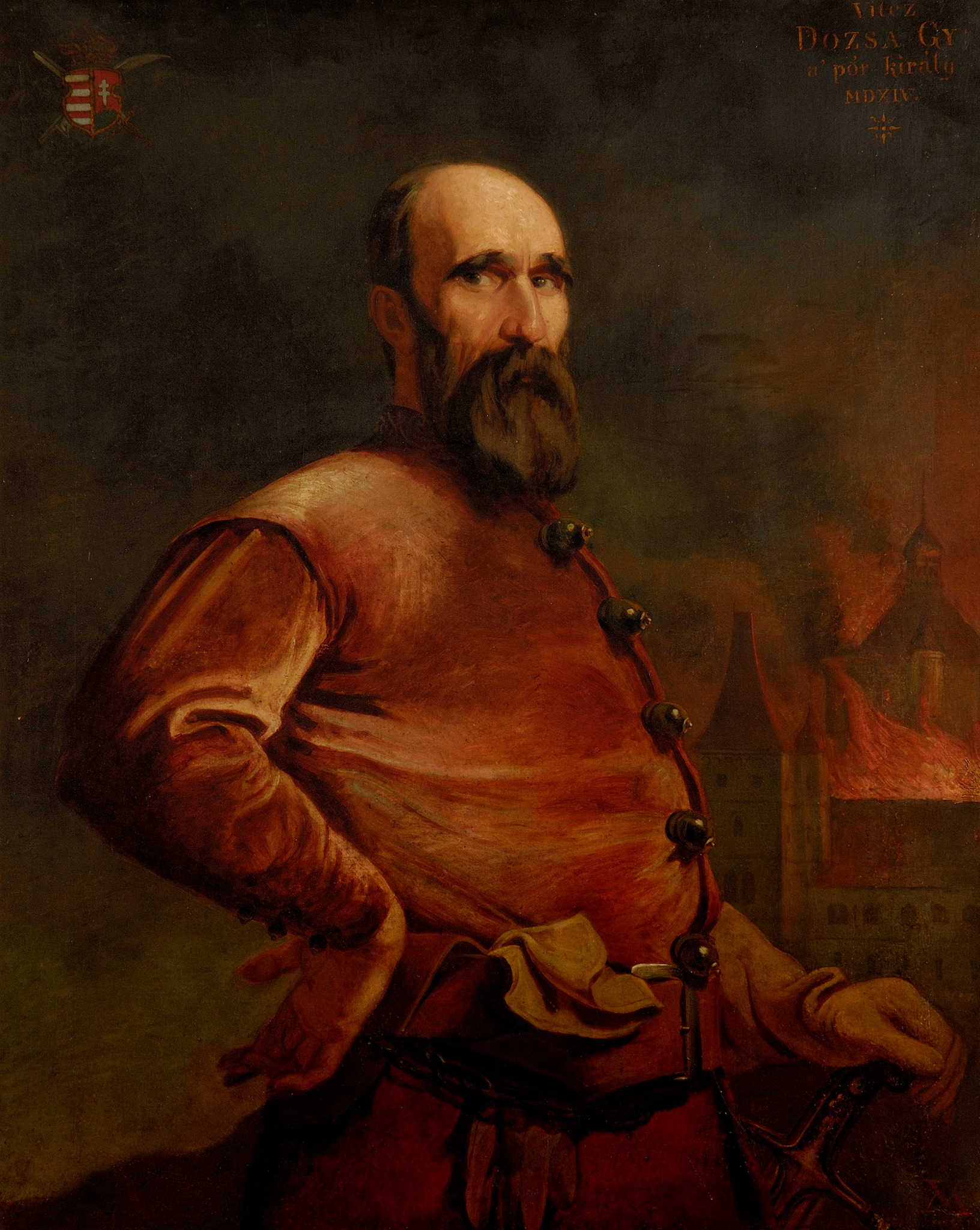
- A posthumous portrait of György Dózsa from 1913, Viktor Madarász
- Born: 1470; Dálnok, Transylvania, Kingdom of Hungary
- Died: 20 July 1514 (aged 43–44); Temesvár, Transylvania, Kingdom of Hungary
- Cause of death: Torture
- Other name: György Székely
- Known for: leader of peasant revolt
- Relatives: Gergely Dózsa (brother)

György Dózsa (or György Székely, (Note: Variations include Gerogius Siculus, Sechel Giorgi, Cecol Giorgio, Zecheel, Zechelius, Zeglius, Georgius quidam Ceculus, Zekel, Georgius Zékel, Sekel, Scytha, Zeck, Seggius, Zeckel, Zechel, Zeel, or even Zäfkl' Jörg. He was named Dózsa (Georgio Doscha Ciculo) in 1571 at the earliest.) Romanian: Gheorghe Doja; c. 1470 – 20 July 1514) was a Székely man-at-arms from Transylvania, Kingdom of Hungary, who led a peasants' revolt against the kingdom's landed nobility during the reign of King Vladislaus II of Hungary. The rebellion was suppressed, and Dózsa captured, tortured, and executed by being seated on a throne (itself smouldering according to legend), crowned with red-hot iron, devoured alive by his followers under duress, and then quartered.

== Ancestry and early life ==
György Dózsa was of Székely origins and known to his contemporaries as György Székely. Based on primary sources, he was probably in his forties or fifties at the time of his execution and thus must have been born around 1470. Nothing more specific is known of his ancestry, family, or early life. His birthplace has been suggested as Dálnok (today Dalnic, Romania). It was asserted by Márki in his 1913 biography of Dózsa that he was the man identified in a 1507 court document as Georgius Dosa Siculus de Makfalva (today Ghindari, Romania) and was therefore from the Dózsa family belonging to the Szovát branch of the Örlőcz clan. This has since been questioned, as variants of the family name Dózsa were 'quite common' at the time in Transylvania. Márki suggested a family tree starting with András Dózsa in the beginning of the 15th century who lived in Marosszék. His sons, Tamás and Ádám would have then moved to Dálnok and started families. Tamás, a vajda (infantry captain) became György Dózsa's father. Pataki doubts this, as Székelys of the lófő rank (as Márki stipulated the Dózsas were) depended on their land for their place in the economic and social hierarchy, which limited their mobility by making them reluctant to sell or exchange their lands (although they did do so at times). Therefore, he considers it unproven that the György Dózsa from Dálnok was the same person recorded as being from Makfalva in the 1507 court document.

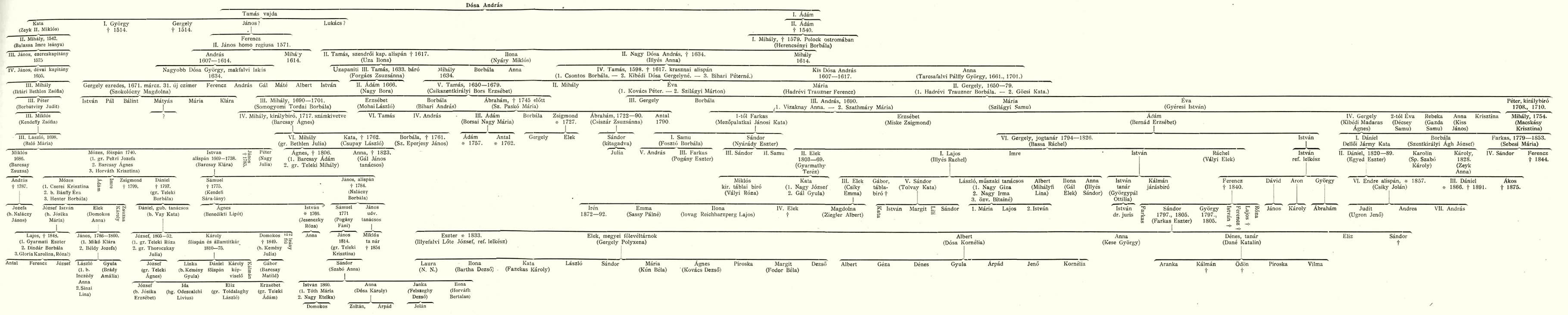
A suggested genealogy of the Dózsa family, drawn by Márki. It is not considered sufficiently proven.

Dózsa had a younger brother, Gergely Dózsa (Gregory Dózsa), who would be executed alongside him. Contemporary sources attest that Dózsa's father had had four sons; besides György and Gergely, they have been named as János (John), Lukács (Lukas), and Menyhért (Melchior). As Lukács is usually credited with the acts attributed to Gergely in other sources, the two names probably denote the same person. Menyhért supposedly became the ban of Croatia, but there is little to support this connection. Márki suggests that János might have been the same as a János Székely inciting a rebellion among the Transylvanian Saxons in 1513–1514, but Pataki disputes this. Márki claims that the family still had members in 1913, descending from Ádám Dózsa, György Dózsa's uncle. However, Pataki found no record of people named Dózsa living in or near Dálnok in the 1602 or the more extensive 1614 census, although many lófő and noble families with the name Székely lived there. Márki further argues that Dózsa had a sister, Katalin, who married Miklós Zeyk, a future supporter of King John Zápolya.

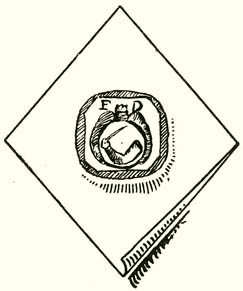
Seal of the Dózsa family from 1677

Dózsa probably did not receive much education, and seems to have been illiterate. He grew up in a time of widespread social upheaval and small rebellions. During the reign of King Matthias Corvinus, which covered what was probably Dózsa's childhood, peasants were taxed oppressively; after Matthias' death in 1490, the War of the Hungarian Succession broke out between John Corvinus (the late King's illegitimate son), Emperor Maximilian I, and two brothers from the Jagiellonian dynasty, John Albert and Vladislaus. The conflict impacted Transylvania, with the Székelys supporting Vladislaus. After his victory, they nevertheless suffered the tyranny of Voivode István Báthory, who extorted rents and taxes by torture and intimidation. Many Székelys fled the country, and Báthory's actions eventually prompted a successful revolt to replace him in December 1492. Even afterwards, the period that was probably Dózsa's youth and early adulthood was punctuated with revolts and rebellions, the most violent in 1506.

If the 1507 court document about Georgius Dosa Siculus de Makfalva indeed refers to Dózsa, he committed a violent robbery at a market in Medgyes (today Mediaș, Romania) that year, killing multiple merchants. The document requests that he be punished and removed in order to preserve the community's peace. However, it remains unclear whether this case concerns Dózsa or another man of a similar name. Family tradition recounted by Márki holds that Dózsa was a 'tall, strong' man with curly brown hair and of exceptional physical strength, but there are no contemporaneous depictions or descriptions of him.

== Mercenary career and heroism ==
It has been claimed by Márki and accepted by Pataki that Dózsa participated in the 1513 campaign of John Zápolya against Ottoman forces. He then probably joined the defence of Nándorfehérvár (today Belgrade, Serbia). Sources mention him as a cavalry captain of great courage during this siege. They tell the story of him beating the Ottoman champion, bey of the sipahis of Szendrő (today Smederevo, Serbia), named as Ali of Epeiros in a duel on 28 February 1514. Ali was a great swordsman, who had already caused the death of many Hungarian valiants during his duels.

Dózsa's desire for glory was growing, and his fellow soldiers tried in vain to dissuade him from challenging the feared Ottoman champion to a duel. According to legend, Dózsa was incensed by Ali insulting the Hungarians and also wanted to take his 'magnificent horse' for himself. In the popular account, the two men first fought with spears then with swords on a field outside the castle of Nándorfehérvár, and Dózsa cut off Ali's armour-covered right hand 'in one [piece]'. He then killed him. Although there is no decisive proof of how the duel exactly happened, it seems to have been considered important: King Vladislaus rewarded Dózsa with a noble title, a village, and a coat of arms. Some accounts claim that Dózsa demanded a prize himself, arriving at Buda with a letter of recommendation from his commander, others that he was summoned by the royal court. He perhaps took Ali's right arm there as proof of his victory. With this victory, Dózsa won a nationwide reputation and fame.

Without any hope of measurable gain, ... why should we quarrel with each other? For what loot could we take from your plain, which has been ruined by continuous war anyways? ... [W]ould it not be better if rather we fought [to gain] war's glory? If, then, Hungarians, any of you wish to distinguish himself and has some little courage: let him stand in the middle and duel with me alone!

— Ali's challenge according to legend

One source claims that Dózsa committed a crime before arriving at court. He is suggested to have been rewarded with a large sum of money by the King, which the treasurer, István Telegdy, refused to give to him. At this, Dózsa murdered a royal tax collector, stole three thousand gold coins from him, and threatened to join the Ottomans. The court feared that Dózsa could open Nándorfehérvár to the enemy, and bought his loyalty with two hundred gold coins and two horses in golden and silver tacks. However, Márki does not believe that this happened, as the court would have had no reason to reward a soldier threatening treason instead of executing him.

When Dózsa arrived in Buda, some primary sources describe him being reprimanded by Miklós Csáky, Bishop of Csanád for his crimes. Dózsa then complained to Cardinal Tamás Bakócz, Archbishop of Esztergom, who gave him command of the crusaders as a consolation. This is unlikely to have happened in this way. Dózsa was, however, knighted by the King, his wages doubled. He was given a village of forty households located between Nándorfehérvár and Temesvár, as well as two hundred gold coins. The coat of arms of his family was also renewed (or given to him to ennoble him, as it is unclear whether his ancestors had been nobles) and a bleeding, cut-off arm holding a sword was included on it. Based on the crimson robes embroidered with gold and golden chain given to him, Márki claims that Dózsa was rewarded above the level of simple knighthood and could have hoped for a career at the royal court.

== Peasant crusade ==
=== Background ===
On 9 March 1513, Pope Leo X was elected, a man enthusiastic about driving the Ottomans out of Europe. On 17 June 1513, he published a bull authorising a crusade, appointing Archbishop Bakócz to organise it. The bull called not on European princes but on the people to fight the holy war and pre-emptively branded anyone who would impede the crusade as a traitor. When he returned to Hungary, the Archbishop was warned by the King that the country was strained financially and unable to furnish even the most important fortresses on the border. Among the leading barons of the country, there was a debate about the wisdom of launching a crusade: Bakócz argued that Hungary needed to exploit the internal strife of the Ottoman Empire for its own protection and go against them with as large an army as possible, considering that foreign aid was unlikely. The treasurer, István Telegdy thought that it would be wiser not to recruit commoners: a large number of missing peasants would be devastating for the country's agriculture during the summer, and untrained agricultural workers had little military value. He proposed only asking commoners for donations and relying on noble's banderiums for the crusade. The party favouring the peasants' crusade won and the bull was published on 9 April. The King arranged for tithes to be redirected to fund the operations.

=== Social tensions and the role of the Franciscans ===
Bakócz entrusted recruitment to the Franciscan order, probably on 25 April 1514. Due to the work of the friars, there were around 15,000 volunteers in the camp at Pest within two weeks. However, there was also news of friars agitating against the feudal order around the country. Radical notions of social equality had been noted among Hungarian Franciscans for decades. Superiors were concerned with a tendency of monks to question authority on the basis that they only owed obedience to God, and with young friars giving lengthy speeches based on scriptures instead of repeating conventional interpretations. From the beginning of the 1510s, these phenomena were exacerbated with apocalyptic visions some Franciscans claimed to have. In 1512 and 1513, there seems to have been a movement of young friars who disobeyed orders and openly criticised bishops and abbots.

Early religious reform ideologies, especially the teachings of Jan Hus, had been present in Hungary for decades, and many of the volunteers had social and political goals in mind when joining the crusade. Franciscans organised 'gatherings' in many parts of the country which worried lords. The friars and their supporters urged peasants to deny the rents and taxes due to the king and to landlords and declared general disobedience to superiors. There were calls for violence against tax collectors and officials. Tensions reached the point of open revolt before 15 May 1514, but on the 20th at the latest, and Bakócz was warned some days before the 15th about attacks against manor houses and the possibility of a widespread uprising.

=== Recruitment ===
At first, volunteers gathered slowly: only three hundred people were in the camp by 24 April. A contemporary source claims that Dózsa went to Bakócz 'extraordinarily upset', asking to be appointed leader of the crusade in order to protect the peasants from exploitation. The chronicler gives the explanation that Dózsa in fact wanted to use the peasant army to take vengeance on the lords for withholding two hundred gold coins of rewards from him. For the time at least, he was not named leader, and the story of him asking for command is an improbable one.

Choosing a commander was a problem for the crusade: the lords 'scorned' at the commons, and none of them were popular enough. Bakócz needed to find someone who was of noble origins (to uphold the notion that armies should be led by nobles), but not powerful enough to arouse the jealousy of the leading lords of the country; he would also need to be liked well enough by peasants and possess some military experience. According to Márki, these were the reasons for the Archbishop entering talks with Dózsa, who had recent experience fighting against the Ottomans and appointed him commander on 24 April. However, there is no mention of Dózsa in contemporary sources before 3 June 1514, and no proof that he was ever appointed to command the crusaders camping around Pest. More recent scholarship suggests that at this early time, a man named Menyhért was in charge, Dózsa only taking control when the displeased peasants became violent. Contemporary diplomatic reports named a Melchior Bannser/Banckwr/Vanser/Vanbosor as commander of the camp, who was probably a German or Czech mercenary captain. During the upheaval of the peasant revolt, this Melchior or Menyhért and Dózsa were often mixed up in reports and it is unclear what actions pertained to which one of them in the early weeks of the crusade and developing revolt.

== Leader of the peasant revolt ==
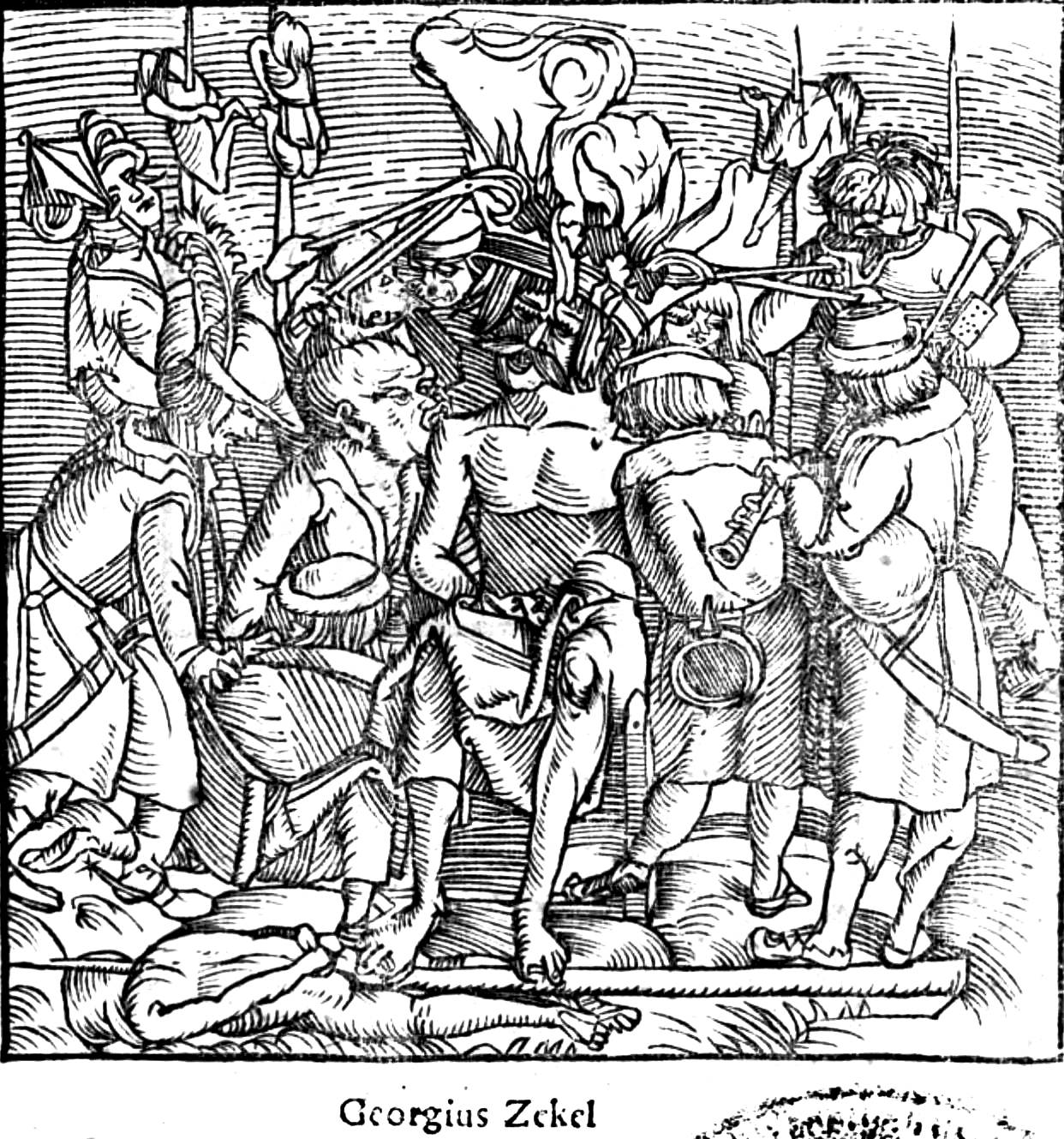
Contemporary woodcut of Dózsa's execution

Within a few weeks, Dózsa had gathered an army of some 40,000 so-called hajdú, consisting for the most part of peasants, wandering students, friars, and parish priests - some of the lowest-ranking groups of medieval society. They assembled in their counties, and by the time he had provided them with some military training, they began to air their grievances about their status. No measures had been taken to supply these voluntary crusaders with food or clothing. As harvest-time approached, the landlords commanded them to return to reap the fields, and, on their refusal to do so, proceeded to maltreat their wives and families and set their armed retainers upon the local peasantry.

The volunteers became increasingly angry at the failure of the nobility to provide military leadership (the original and primary function of the nobility and the justification for their higher status in the society.) The rebellious, anti-landlord sentiment of these "Crusaders" became apparent during their march across the Great Hungarian Plain, and Bakócz cancelled the campaign. At that time, Bakócz stopped recruiting on the news of the clashes between peasants and nobles in Mezőtúr, and later on he stopped the whole campaign. However, György Dózsa, his brother Gergely Dózsa and several Franciscan friars, headed by the priest Lőrinc, disobeyed the order to stop the recruitment. From then on, the crusaders labelled the nobles and the king himself as pro-Ottoman traitors. After that, the peasant armies regarded the defeat of the nobility and the king as a prerequisite for victory in their crusade against the Ottoman Empire.

The movement was thus diverted from its original object, and the peasants and their leaders began a war of vengeance against the landlords.

=== Dózsa's most notable elected co-leaders ===
The peasant armies did not trust the leadership of the nobility, thus they elected their own leaders.

- Gregory Dózsa (Gergely Dózsa), younger brother of György Dózsa,
- Laurence Mészáros (Lőrinc Mészáros), a Franciscan friar and parish priest of Cegléd, who in his proclamation, in the name of the Pope, King Vladislaus and the legate, promised the forgiveness of all sins and otherworldly punishment to those who go to the crusade, help it and take care of its sick, but he threatened church curses to those who do not do this.
- "Priest Barabbas" (Barabás),
- Ambrose Ványa (Ambrus Ványa) from Turkeve, a Franciscan theologist who graduated from the university, he edited Dozsa's fiery proclamations to the people,
- Thomas Kecskés (Tamás Kecskés) from Aszaló,
- Francis Bagos (Ferenc Bagos),
- Anthony Nagy (Antal Nagy), the leader of the Kalocsa crusaders, nobleman from Sárköz,
- Benedict Pogány (Benedek Pogány),
- Ambrose Száleresi (Ambrus Száleresi), a well-to-do citizen of Pest.

=== Social Goals ===
Based on the research of professor Sándor Márki, Dózsa and his co-elected senior fellows wanted to reform the church and the political system fundamentally. They aimed to have a single elected bishop for the entire country and to make all priests equal in rank. They also wanted to abolish the nobility and distribute the lands of the nobility and the Catholic Church equally among the peasants. They decided that there should be only two orders: the city bourgeoise (merchants and craftsmen) and the peasants, and they also wanted to abolish the kingdom as a form of government. Dózsa himself only wanted to be the warlord and representative of the people: subordinating himself in everything to the decisions of the people.

The formerly peasant origin Franciscan friars became the ideologues of the uprising. With their help, Dózsa effectively threatened to excommunicate the religiously minded peasant soldiers in his army if they betrayed their "holy crusader movement" and their "just" social goals.

== Growing rebellion ==
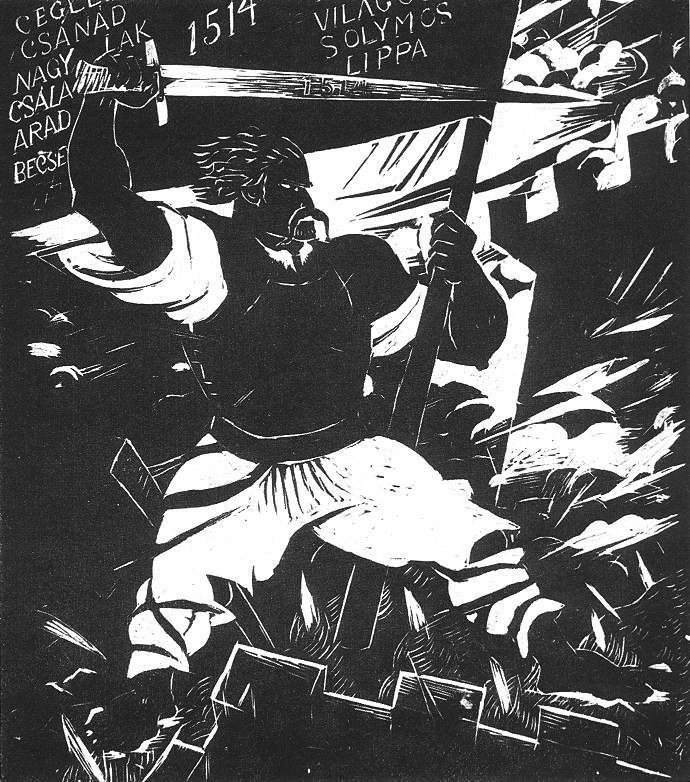
Dózsa on the Wall from the "Dózsa woodcut series" by Gyula Derkovits, 1928

I, George Dózsa, the mighty champion valiant, head and captain of the blessed people of the Crusaders, only King of Hungary - but not subject of the Lords - individually and collectively send you our greetings! To all the cities, market towns, and villages of Hungary, especially in the counties of Pest and Outer Szolnok. Know ye that the treacherous lying nobility have risen up violently against us and against all the crusading armies preparing for holy war, to persecute and exterminate us. Therefore, under the penalty of banishment and eternal damnation, not to mention the death penalty and the loss of all your goods, we strictly enjoin and order you, that immediately after receiving this letter, without delay or excuse, you hasten here to the city of Cegléd, so that you, the blessed simple people, strengthened in the covenant sanctified by you, nobles must be limited, restrained, and destroyed. If not, you will not escape the punishment of the nobles intended for you. What’s more, we ordinary commoners suspend and hang nobles on their own gates, hang on skewers, destroy their property, tear down their houses, and kill their wives and children in the midst of the greatest possible torture.

— Dózsa's speech at Cegléd

The rebellion became more dangerous when the towns joined on the side of the peasants. In Buda and elsewhere, the cavalry sent against them were unhorsed as they passed through the gates.

The rebellion spread quickly, principally in the central or purely Magyar provinces, where hundreds of manor houses and castles were burnt and thousands of the lower untitled gentry noblemen were killed by impalement, crucifixion, and other methods. Dózsa's camp at Cegléd was the centre of the jacquerie, as all raids in the surrounding area started out from there.

In reaction, the papal bull was revoked, and King Vladislaus issued a proclamation commanding the peasantry to return to their homes under pain of death. By this time, the uprising had attained the dimensions of a revolution; all the vassals of the kingdom were called out against it, and soldiers of fortune were hired in haste from the Republic of Venice, Bohemia, and the Holy Roman Empire. Meanwhile, Dózsa had captured the city and fortress of Csanád (today's Cenad), and signalled his victory by impaling the bishop and the castellan.

Subsequently, at Arad, Lord Treasurer István Telegdy was seized and tortured to death. In general, however, the rebels only executed particularly vicious or greedy noblemen; those who freely submitted were released on parole. Dózsa not only never broke his given word, but frequently assisted the escape of fugitives. He was unable to consistently control his followers, however, and many of them hunted down rivals.

== Downfall and execution ==
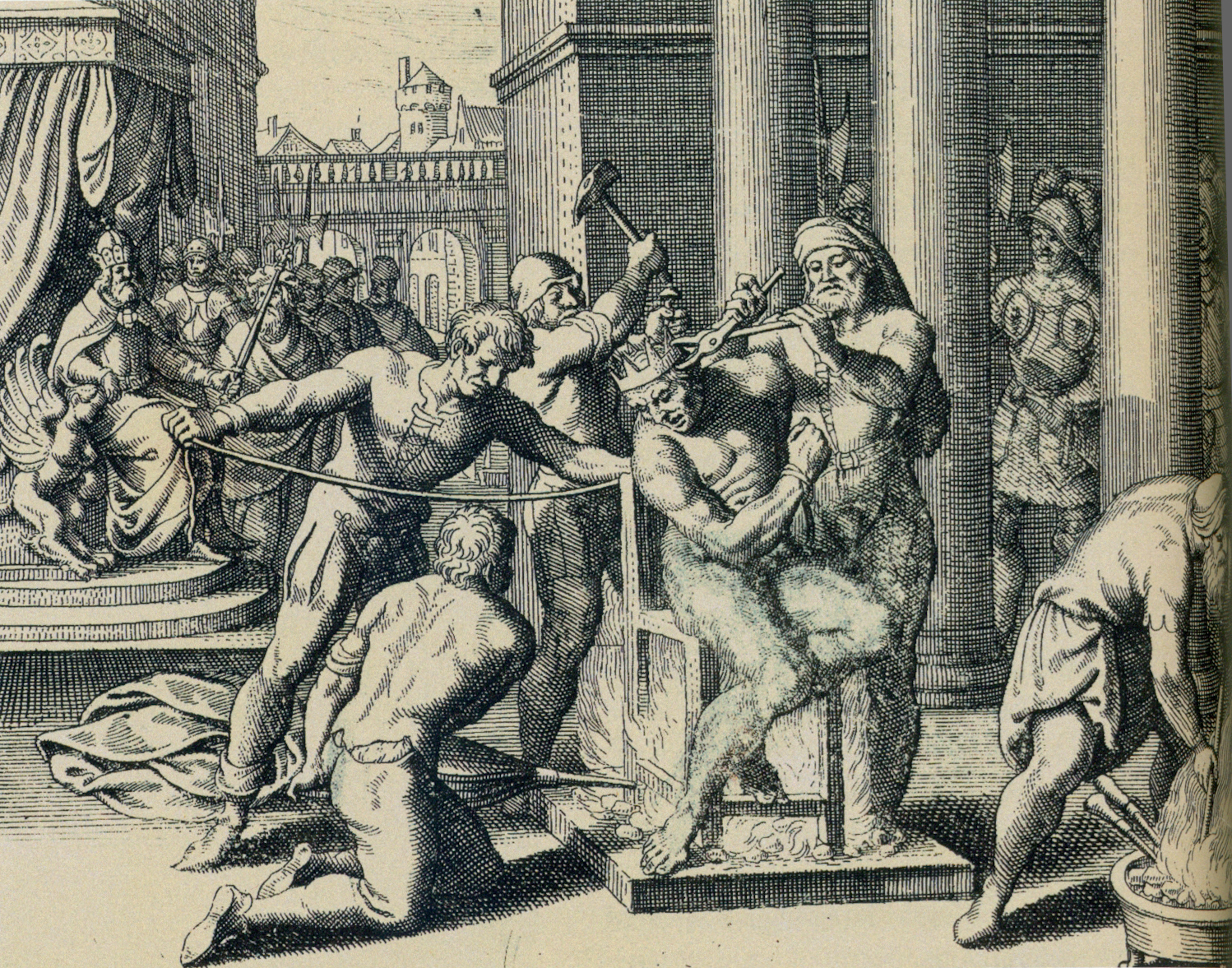
Dózsa's execution

In the course of the summer, Dózsa seized the fortresses of Arad, Lippa (today Lipova), and Világos (now Şiria), and provided himself with cannons and trained gunners. One of his bands advanced to within 25 kilometres of the capital. But his ill-armed ploughmen were outmatched by the heavy cavalry of the nobles. Dózsa himself had apparently become demoralized by success: after Csanád, he issued proclamations which can be described as nihilistic.

As his suppression had become a political necessity, Dózsa was routed at Temesvár (today Timișoara, Romania) on 15 July 1514 by an army of 20,000 led by John Zápolya and Stephen Báthory. He was captured after the battle, and condemned to sit on a smouldering, heated iron throne, and forced to wear a heated iron crown and sceptre (mocking his ambition to be king). While he was suffering, a procession of nine fellow rebels who had been starved beforehand were led to this throne. In the lead was Dózsa's younger brother, Gergely, who was cut in three despite Dózsa asking for Gergely to be spared. Next, executioners removed some pliers from a fire and forced them into Dózsa's skin. After tearing his flesh, the remaining rebels were ordered to bite spots where the hot pliers had been inserted and to swallow the flesh. The three or four who refused were simply cut up, prompting the others to comply. In the end, Dózsa died from the ordeal, while the rebels who obeyed were released and left alone.

The revolt was repressed but some 70,000 peasants were tortured. György's execution, and the brutal suppression of the peasants, greatly aided the 1526 Ottoman invasion as the Hungarians were no longer a politically united people and peasants rejected military service against the Ottomans. Another consequence was the creation of new laws, an effort in the Hungarian Diet led by István Werbőczy. The resulting Tripartitum elaborated the old rights of peasants, but also greatly enhanced the status of lesser nobility (gentry), erecting an iron curtain between Hungarians until 1848 when serfdom was abolished.

== Legacy ==
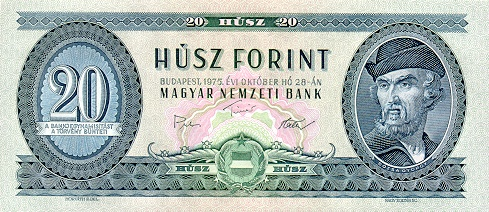
Dózsa's portrait on the former 20 forint banknote

The often biased historiography of the nobility later often claimed that the memory of György Dózsa served as a role model for other great peasant uprisings on the territory of the Hungarian crown, such as the revolt of Jovan of Czerni, which took place barely twelve years after the Dózsa War, and the peasant uprising in Croatia led by Ambroz Gubec in 1572–1573.

Today, on the site of the martyrdom of the hot throne, there is the Virgin Mary Monument, built by architect László Székely and sculptor György Kiss. According to the legend, during György Dózsa's torture, some friars saw in his ear the image of Mary. The first statue was raised in 1865, with the actual monument raised in 1906. Hungarian opera composer Ferenc Erkel wrote an opera, Dózsa György, about him.

On 1 May 1919, the short-lived Hungarian Soviet Republic honored Dózsa with a relief near the Parliament Building in Budapest. Similarly, his revolutionary image and Transylvanian background were drawn upon during the Romanian Communist regime of Gheorghe Gheorghiu-Dej. The Hungarian component of his movement was downplayed, but its strong anti-feudal character was emphasized.

In Budapest, a square, a busy six-lane avenue, and a metro station bear his name, and it is one of the most popular street names in Hungarian villages. A number of streets in several cities of Romania were named Gheorghe Doja. Also, a number of streets in several cities of Serbia were named "Ulica Doža Đerđa". Two Postage stamps were issued in his honour by Hungary on 12 June 1919 and on 15 March 1947, the latter in the "social revolutionists" series.

== See also ==
- List of incidents of cannibalism

== Sources ==
- C. Tóth, Norbert (2015). "Az apátfalvi–nagylaki csata. A keresztes fősereg útja Pesttől Nagylakig" [The Battle of Apátfalva-Nagylak. The Route of the Main Crusader Army from Pest to Nagylak]. Keresztesekből lázadók. Tanulmányok 1514 Magyarországáról [From Crusaders to Rebels. Studies of the Hungary of 1514] (PDF) (in Hungarian). Budapest: MTA Bölcsészettudományi Kutatóközpont Történettudományi Intézet. ISBN 9789634160120.
- Barabási, Albert-László (2010). Bursts (First ed.). New York, United States: Penguin Group. ISBN 978-0-525-95160-5.
- Pataki, József (August 1971). "Dózsa György életútjáról" [On the Life Journey of György Dózsa] (PDF). Korunk (in Hungarian). 30 (8): 1147–1155 – via EPA OSZK.
- Molnar, Miklos (2001). A Concise History of Hungary. Cambridge Concise Histories (Fifth printing 2008 ed.). Cambridge, United Kingdom: Cambridge University Press. ISBN 978-0-521-66736-4.
- Szűcs, Jenő (1974). "Ferences ellenzéki áramlat a magyar parasztháború és reformáció hátterében" [A Current of Franscican Opposition in the Background of the Hungarian Peasant War and Reformation] (PDF). Irodalomtörténeti Közlemények (in Hungarian). LXXVIII (4): 409–435 – via EPA OSZK.
