= Treaty of Brno (1920) =

1920 treaty between Austria and Czechoslovakia

The Treaty of Brno was signed on 7 June 1920 in Brno between representatives of Austria and Czechoslovakia. Under the treaty, both nations agreed to naturalize all residents, within their respective language groups. Anyone, for example, who was an official resident of Austria (i.e., Heimatgemeinde) was automatically regarded as Austrian. Individuals who had lived in Austria before World War 1 would be given special treatment during the process of naturalisation. Except for Jewish groups, many Czechs, Slovaks, and Italians who had migrated to Austria could easily acquire citizenship.

== See also ==
- List of treaties

== Sources ==
- Dale, Gareth and Cole, Mike. The European Union and Migrant Labour. Berg Publishers, 1999. ISBN 1-85973-965-2.
