= Peace of Olomouc =

1479 treaty between Hungary and Bohemia

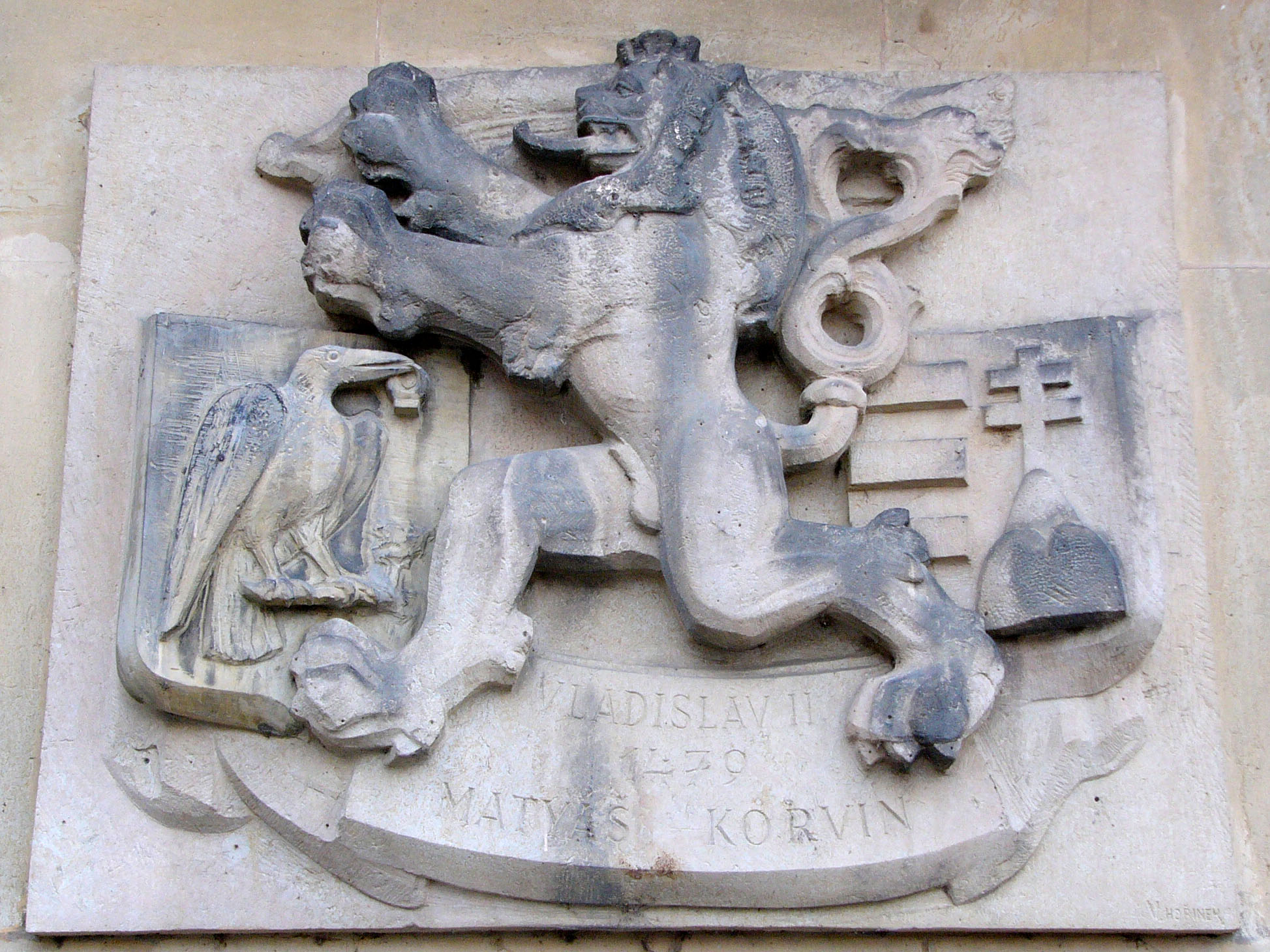
Plaque of Peace of Olomouc in 1479 between Ladislaus Jagiellon and Matthias Corvinus.

The Peace of Olomouc was signed on 2 April 1479 between Matthias Corvinus of Hungary and King Vladislaus II of Bohemia (and Hungary, later), bringing the Bohemian–Hungarian War (1468–1478) to an end. On 21 July 1479 the agreement was ratified during the course of festivities in Olomouc. This treaty, overall, ratified all terms within the Treaty of Brno developed in March 1478 (with slight modifications made by the King of Hungary on 20 September 1478). Based on the terms of the treaty, Vladislaus would cede the territories of Moravia, Silesia, and Lusatia to Corvinus. If Matthias perished, then Vladislaus could redeem these lands for 400,000 florins. Moreover, both monarchs would be permitted to utilize the title King of Bohemia. However, only Matthias was required to address the other claimant as the King of Bohemia.

== See also ==
- List of treaties
- Treaty of Brno (1478)

== Sources ==
- Engel, Pál (translated by Tamas Palosfalvi). The Realm of St Stephen: A History of Medieval Hungary, 895-1526. I.B. Tauris, 2005. ISBN 1-85043-977-X.
