= Bohemian–Hungarian War (1468–1478) =

Military conflict

- Part of the Crusades
Date	1468–1478
Location	Kingdom of Bohemia, Holy Roman Empire
Result	Treaty of Brno

Belligerents
Crusade: Hungarian Crown; Union of Green Mountain; Bavaria; Upper Lusatia; Bishopric of Wrocław; Bishopric of Olomouc	Bohemian Crown: Bohemia; Moravia

Commanders and leaders
Matthias Corvinus; Pál Kinizsi; Zdeněk of Šternberk; Jaroslav of Šternberk; Jošt of Rožmberk; Protasius of Boskovice; Kyvolf †	George of Poděbrady; Vladislaus II Jagiellon; Joanna of Rožmitál; Victor of Poděbrady; Zdeněk Kostka of Postupice †; Václav Vlček of Čenov; Ctibor Tovačovský of Cimburk; John II of Rosenberg; Burian II of Gutštejn

Units involved
Black Army	Unspecified

The Bohemian War (1468–1478) began when the Kingdom of Bohemia was invaded by the king of Hungary, Matthias Corvinus. Matthias invaded with the pretext of returning Bohemia to Catholicism; at the time, it was ruled by the Hussite king, George of Poděbrady. Matthias' invasion was largely successful, leading to his acquisition of the southern and eastern parts of the country. Its core lands however, centered on Prague, were never taken. Ultimately both Matthias and George would proclaim themselves king, though neither ever acquired all the necessary subordinate titles. When George died in 1471, his successor Vladislaus II continued the fight against Matthias. In 1478, the war ended following the treaties of Brno and the Olomouc. Upon Matthias' death in 1490, Vladislaus would succeed him as king of both Hungary and Bohemia.

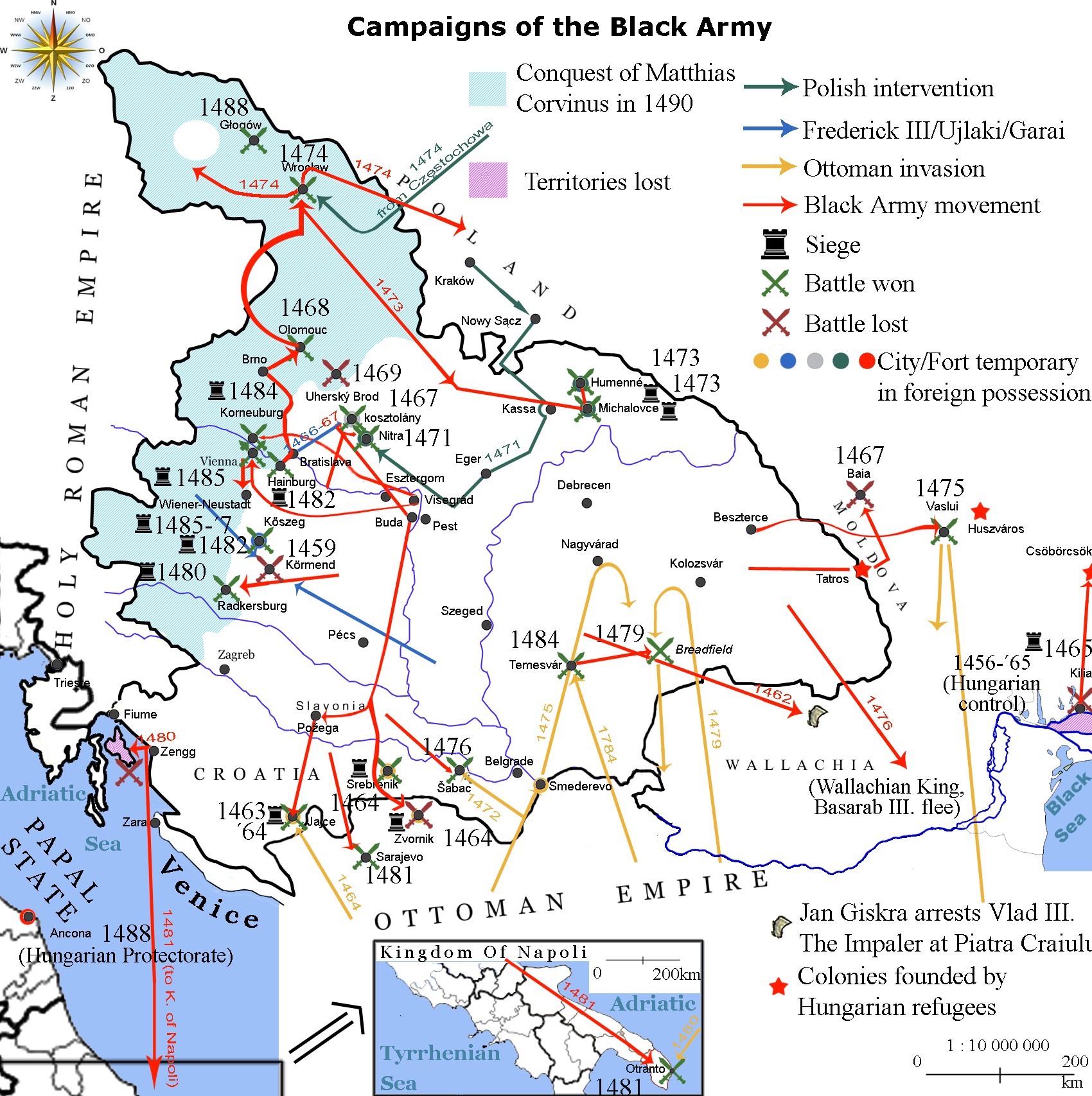
Bohemian-Hungarian wars on a map in the context of the Hungarian Black Army campaigns

== Background ==
At the beginning of his reign, Matthias continued the policy of his father John Hunyadi in defending Hungary, the "bulwark of Christendom," against the Turks. However, as Matthias led campaigns each year, he came to the realization that by the late 15th century it was no longer possible to oust the Ottoman Turks from Europe. Rankling under the heavy costs of bordering the Sultan, and resenting his Christian neighbors, like Frederick III, who often meddled in Hungary when Matthias was on campaign, Matthias made the radical decision to come to an entente with the Turks, enabling the Hungarian king to turn westward.

== War ==
In 1468, Matthias began a war in Bohemia on the pretext of restoring that land to the Papacy. George of Poděbrady, the Bohemian king who had once protected Matthias, had made himself too tempting a target when he made enemies out of two Popes and became alienated from most of his Catholic neighbors. Matthias seized Moravia and Silesia from George and proclaimed himself the Czech king; yet Matthias was never able to seize Prague from the Hussites. The war would continue with George's successor Vladislaus II, until the latter signed the Treaty of Brno with Matthias in 1478, recognizing the Hungarian king's conquests. The Peace of Olomouc would confirm the Treaty of Brno.

With Matthias' death in 1490, Vladislaus would succeed Matthias as king of both Hungary and Bohemia.

== See also ==
- Hussite Wars
- Austrian–Hungarian War (1477–1488)
