= Frederick III, Holy Roman Emperor =

Holy Roman Emperor from 1452 to 1493

Frederick III
- Imperator Romanorum
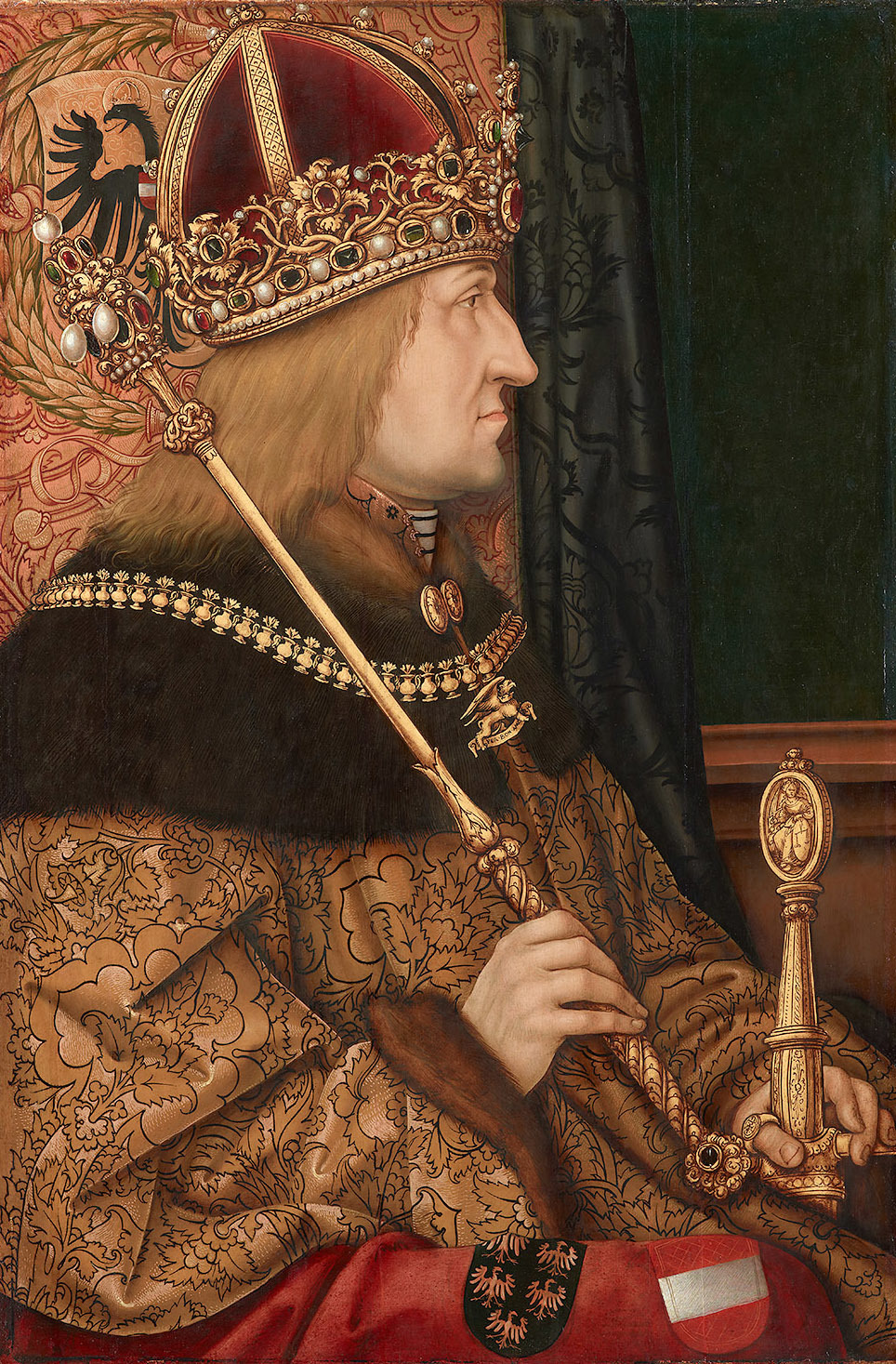
- Portrait by Hans Burgkmair, c. 1500

Holy Roman Emperor; King of Italy
- Reign: 19 March 1452 – 19 August 1493
- Coronation: 19 March 1452
- Predecessor: Sigismund
- Successor: Maximilian I

King of the Romans King of Germany
- Reign: 2 February 1440 – 19 August 1493
- Coronation: 17 June 1442
- Predecessor: Albert II
- Successor: Maximilian I
- Alongside: Maximilian I (1486–1493)

Archduke of Austria
- Reign: 23 November 1457 – 19 August 1493
- Predecessor: Ladislaus the Posthumous
- Successor: Maximilian I
- Alongside: Albert VI (1457–1463)

Duke of Styria, Carinthia, and Carniola (Inner Austria)
- Reign: 10 June 1424 – 19 August 1493
- Predecessor: Ernest
- Successor: Maximilian I
- Alongside: Albert VI (1424–1463)
- Born: 21 September 1415; Innsbruck, Tyrol
- Died: 19 August 1493 (aged 77); Linz, Austria
- Burial: St. Stephen's Cathedral, Vienna
- Spouse: Eleanor of Portugal (m. 1452; died 1467)
- Issue more...: Maximilian I, Holy Roman Emperor; Kunigunde, Duchess of Bavaria
- House: Habsburg
- Father: Ernest, Duke of Austria
- Mother: Cymburgis of Masovia

Frederick III (German: Friedrich III, 21 September 1415 – 19 August 1493) was the Holy Roman emperor from 1452 until his death in 1493. He was the penultimate emperor to be crowned by the pope, and the last to be crowned in Rome. He was the fourth king of the Romans and the first Holy Roman emperor from the House of Habsburg, which was to retain the title with one gap, Charles VII of Bohemia, until it was declared at an end by Emperor Francis II, in 1806.

Prior to his imperial coronation, he was duke of the Inner Austrian lands of Styria, Carinthia, and Carniola from 1424, and also acted as regent over the Duchy of Austria from 1439. He was elected and crowned King of Germany in 1440. His reign of 41 years is the longest in the history of the Holy Roman Empire or the German monarchy. Upon his death in 1493, he was succeeded by his son Maximilian I.

During his reign, Frederick concentrated on re-uniting the Habsburg "hereditary lands" of Austria and took a lesser interest in Imperial affairs. Nevertheless, by his dynastic entitlement to Hungary as well as by the Burgundian inheritance, he laid the foundations for the later Habsburg Empire. Despite being mocked as "Arch-Sleepyhead of the Holy Roman Empire" (German: Erzschlafmütze) during his lifetime, he is today increasingly seen as an effective ruler.

Historian Thomas A. Brady Jr. credited Frederick with leaving a credible claim on the imperial title and a secure grip on the Austrian lands, now organised as a single state, for his son. This imperial revival (as well as the rise of the territorial state) began under the reign of Frederick.

== Early life ==
Born at the Tyrolean residence of Innsbruck in 1415, Frederick was the eldest son of the Inner Austrian duke Ernest, Duke of Austria, a member of the Leopoldian line of the Habsburg dynasty, and his second wife Cymburgis of Masovia. According to the 1379 Treaty of Neuberg, the Leopoldinian branch ruled over the duchies of Styria, Carinthia, and Carniola, or what was referred to as Inner Austria. Only three of Frederick's eight siblings survived childhood: his younger brother Albert of Austria (later to be Albert VI, archduke of Austria), and his sisters Margaret of Austria (later the electress of Saxony) and Catherine of Austria. In 1424, nine-year-old Frederick's father died, making Frederick the duke of Inner Austria, as Frederick V, with his uncle, Frederick IV of Austria, acting as regent.

From 1431, Frederick tried to obtain the majority (to be declared "of age", and thus allowed to rule), but for several years was denied by his relatives. Finally, in 1435, Albert V, duke of Austria (later Albert II, the king of Germany), awarded him the rule over his Inner Austrian heritage. Almost from the beginning, Frederick's younger brother Albert asserted his rights as a co-ruler, as the beginning of a long rivalry. Already in these years, Frederick had begun to use the symbolic A.E.I.O.U. signature as a kind of motto with various meanings. In 1436, he made a pilgrimage to the Holy Land, accompanied by numerous nobles knighted by the Order of the Holy Sepulchre, which earned him a great reputation.

Upon the death of his uncle, Duke Frederick IV, Duke of Austria in 1439, Frederick III took over the regency of Tyrol and Further Austria for the duke's heir Sigismund. Again, he had to ward off the claims raised by his brother Albert VI, Archduke of Austria; he prevailed with the support of the Tyrolean aristocracy. Likewise, he acted as regent for his nephew Ladislaus the Posthumous, son of late King Albert II and his consort Elizabeth of Luxembourg, in the duchy of Austria (Further Austria). (Ladislaus would die before coming of age). Frederick was now the undisputed head of the House of Habsburg, though his regency in the lands of the Albertinian Line (Further Austria) was still viewed with suspicion.

As a cousin of late King Albert II, Frederick became a candidate for the 1440 imperial election. On 2 February 1440, the prince-electors convened at Frankfurt and unanimously elected him King of the Romans; his rule was still based on his hereditary lands of Styria, Carinthia, and Carniola or Inner Austria.

In 1442, Frederick allied himself with Rudolf Stüssi, burgomaster of Zürich, against the Old Swiss Confederacy in the Old Zürich War (Alter Zürichkrieg) but lost. In 1448, he entered into the Concordat of Vienna with the Holy See, which remained in force until 1806 and regulated the relationship between the Habsburgs and the Holy See.

In 1452, at the age of 37, Frederick III travelled to Italy to receive his bride and to be crowned Holy Roman Emperor. His fiancée, the 17-year-old infanta Eleanor, daughter of King Edward of Portugal, landed at Livorno (Leghorn) after a 104-day trip. Her dowry would help Frederick alleviate his debts and cement his power. The couple met at Siena on 24 February and proceeded together to Rome. As per tradition, they spent a night outside the walls of Rome before entering the city on 9 March, where Frederick and Pope Nicholas V exchanged friendly greetings. Because the emperor had been unable to retrieve the Iron Crown of Lombardy from the cathedral of Monza where it was kept, nor be crowned King of Italy by the archbishop of Milan (on account of Frederick's dispute with Francesco I Sforza, lord of Milan), he convinced the pope to crown him as such with the German crown, which had been brought for the purpose. This coronation took place on the morning of 16 March, in spite of the protests of the Milanese ambassadors, and in the afternoon, Frederick and Eleanor were married by the pope. Finally, on 19 March, Frederick and Eleanor were anointed in St Peter's Basilica by the Vice-Chancellor of the Holy Roman Church, Cardinal Francesco Condulmer, and Frederick was then crowned with the Imperial Crown by the pope. Frederick III was the last Holy Roman Emperor to be crowned in Rome. His great-grandson Charles V was the last emperor to be crowned, but this was done in Bologna.

== Personality ==
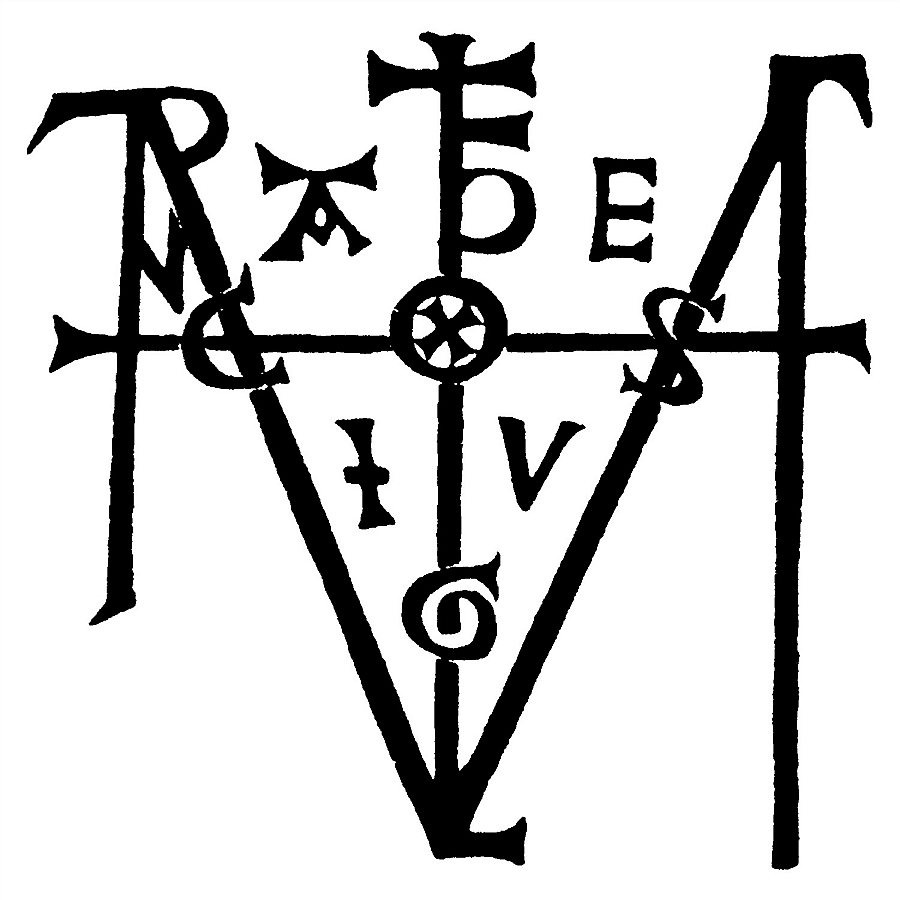
Signum manus of Frederick III

Frederick's style of rulership was marked by hesitation and a sluggish pace of decision making. The Italian humanist Enea Silvio Piccolomini, later Pope Pius II, who at one time worked at Frederick's court, described the Emperor as a person who wanted to conquer the world while remaining seated. Although this was regarded as a character flaw in older academic research, his delaying tactics are now viewed as a means of coping with political challenges in far-flung territorial possessions. Frederick is credited with having the ability to sit out difficult political situations patiently.

According to contemporary accounts, Frederick had difficulties developing emotional closeness to other persons, including his children and wife Eleanor. Unlike his brother Albert and his son Maximilian, Frederick maintained a reserved lifestyle. Although he was willing to appear in social events like festivals and tournaments, he disliked lavish feasts. Later he became horrified when his son, still in early teen years, displayed a tendency towards wine, feasts and women. As Frederick was rather distant to his family, Eleanor had a great influence on the raising and education of Frederick's children, and she therefore played an important role in the House of Habsburg's rise to prominence. Despite the fact that their marriage had been unhappy, when Eleanor died, the Emperor was affected by her loss and remained widowed for the rest of his long life.

== Emperor ==
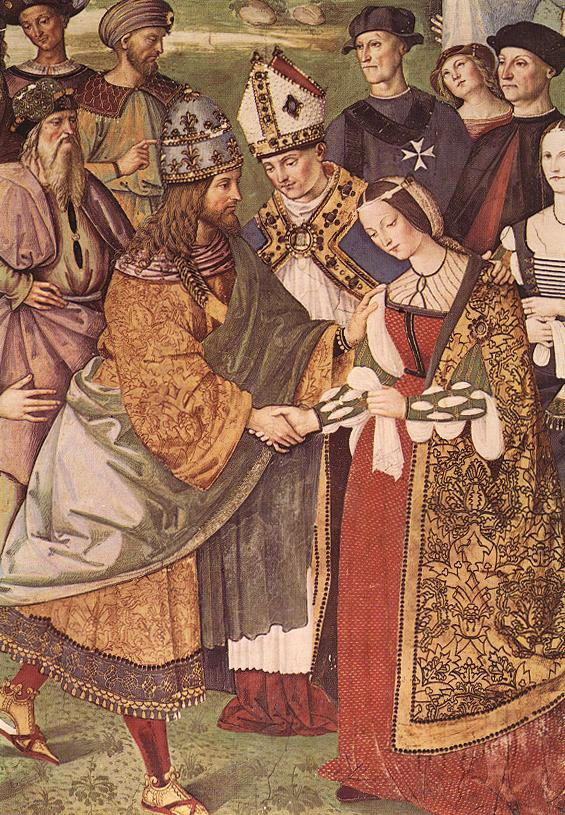
Detail of Aeneas Piccolomini introduces Eleonora of Portugal to Frederick III by Pinturicchio (1454–1513)

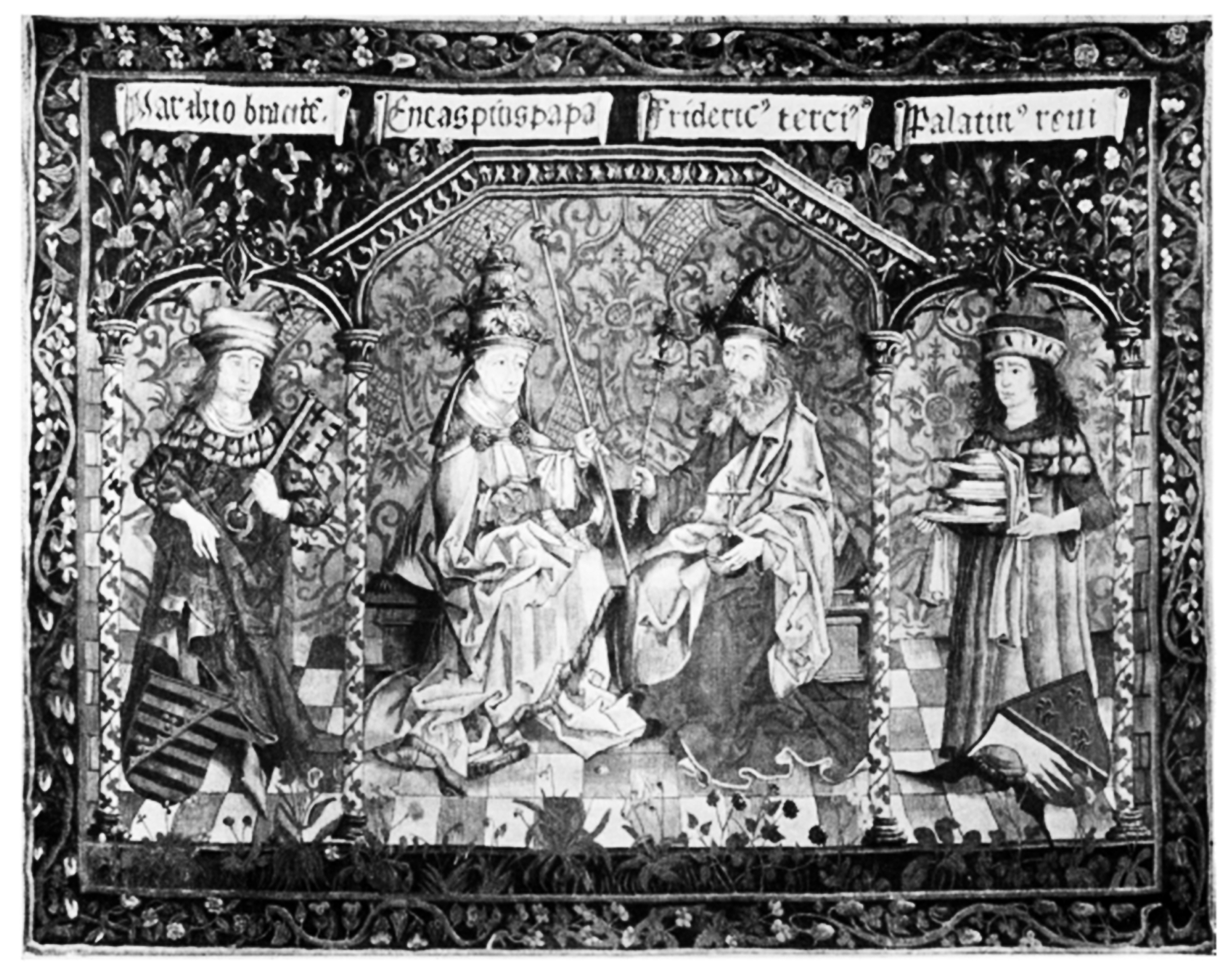
A tapestry depicting the coronation of Frederick III, which misattributes the Pope in attendance as Pope Pius II.

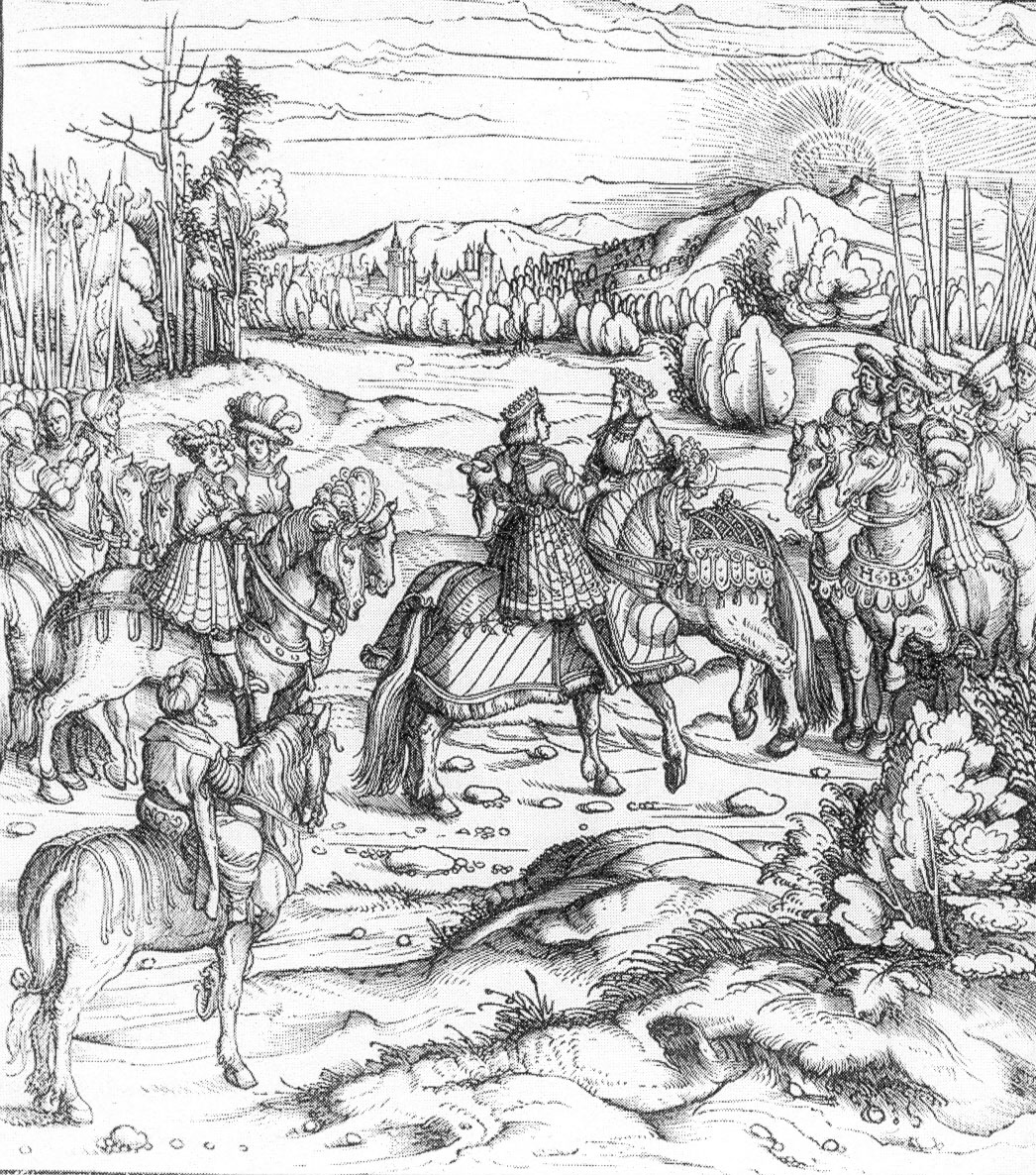
Frederick III meeting with Charles the Bold

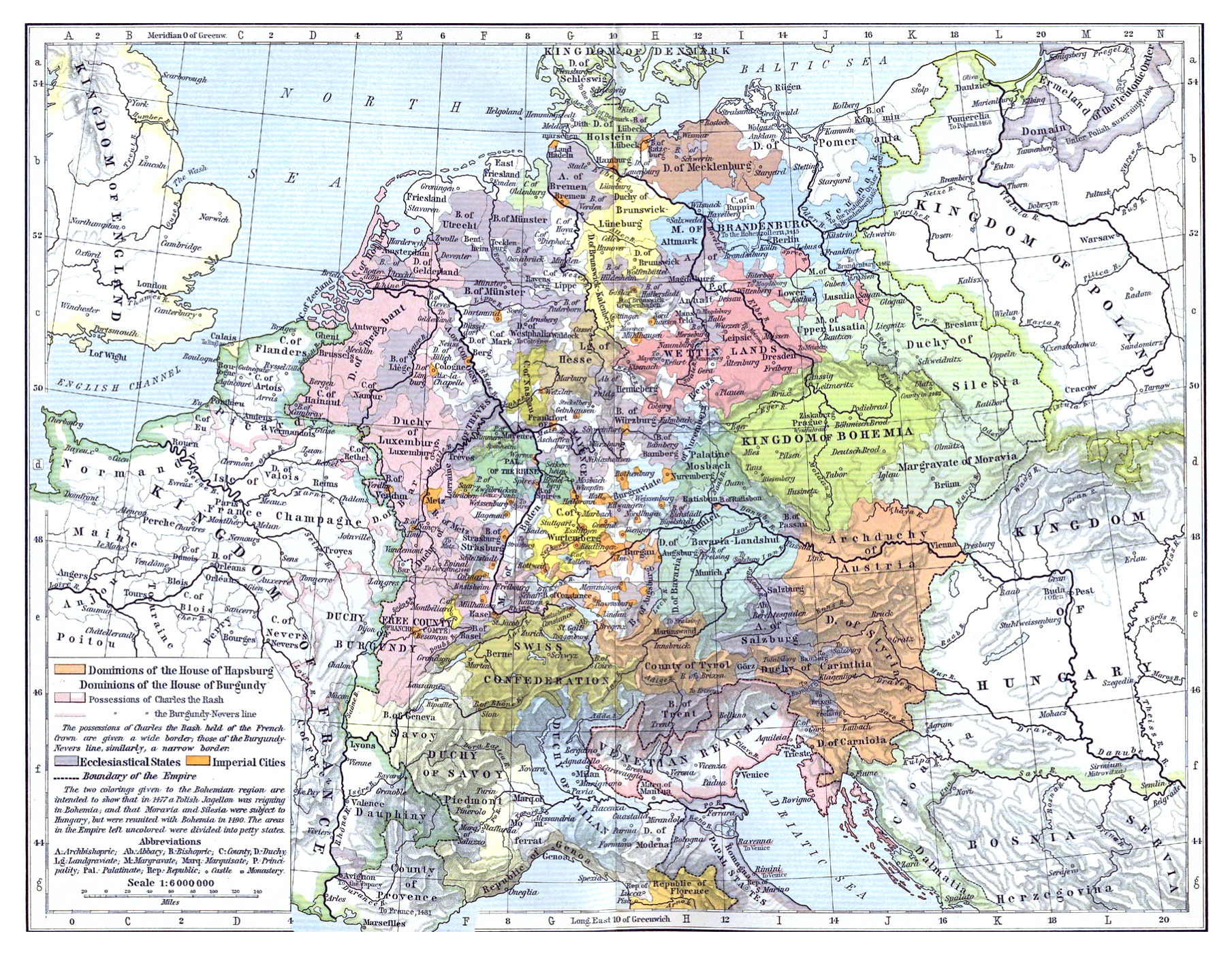
Habsburg lands under Frederick V, c. 1477

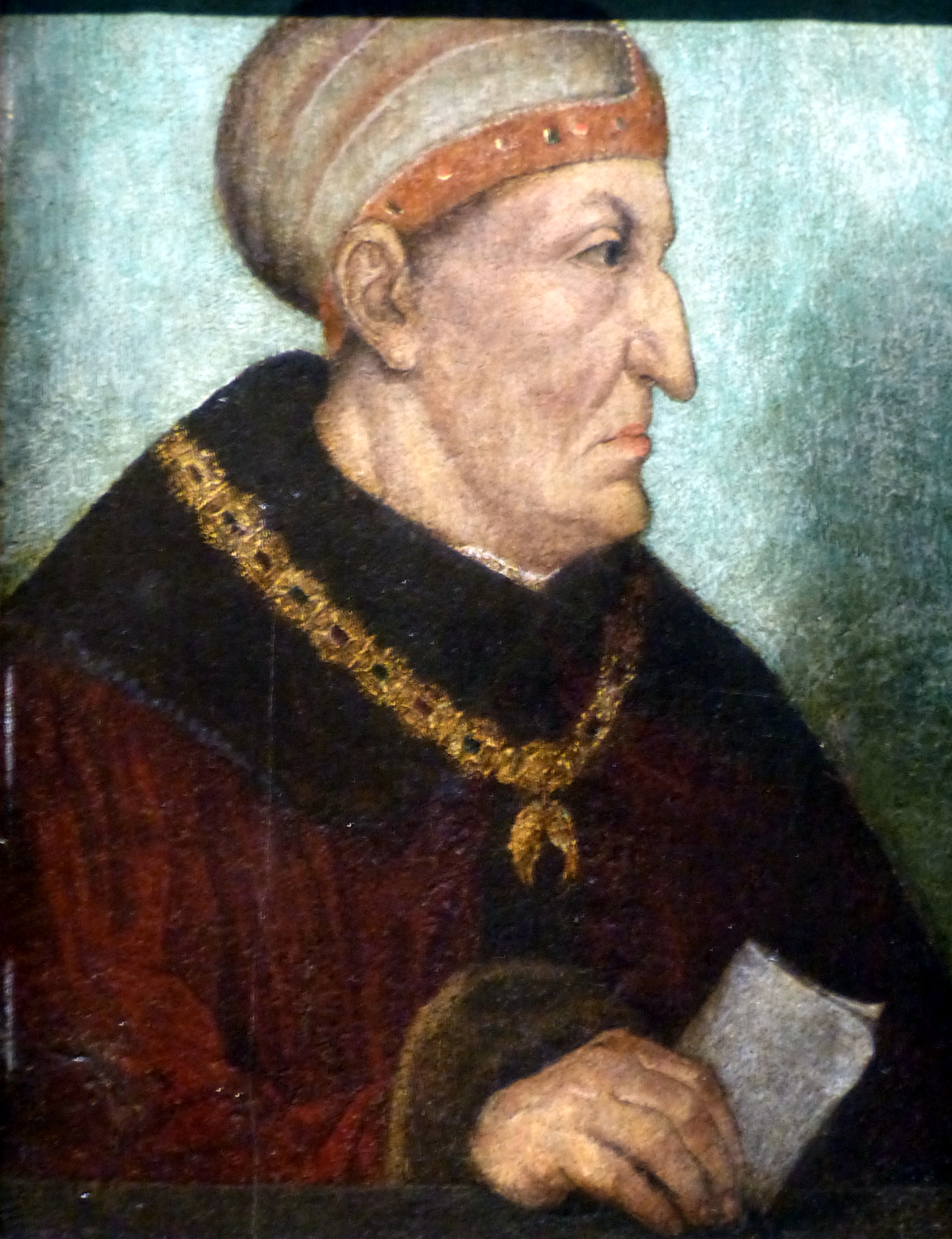
Frederick in old age

Frederick's political initiatives were hardly bold, but they were still successful. Frederick III was crowned Holy Roman Emperor in 1452, the first since the death of Emperor Sigismund. His ascension to the role of Emperor came with the stipulation that should the previous queen of Bohemia (wife of Albert V of the Albertine line) give birth to a male heir, Frederick would become his guardian. When the queen gave birth to Ladislaus the Posthumous, as according to the stipulations, Frederick took on his guardianship. This led to conflicts between Frederick and other members of the royal family and nobility. His first major opponent was his brother Albert VI, who challenged his rule. He did not manage to win a single conflict on the battlefield against him, and thus resorted to more subtle means. He held his second cousin once removed Ladislaus the Posthumous, the ruler of the Archduchy of Austria, Hungary, and Bohemia (born in 1440) as a prisoner and attempted to extend his guardianship over him in perpetuity to maintain his control over Lower Austria. Ladislaus was freed in 1452 by the Lower Austrian estates. He acted similarly towards his first cousin Sigismund of the Tyrolian line of the Habsburg family. One of his important advisors during this time was Friedrich II von Graben.

Ultimately, Frederick prevailed in all those conflicts by outliving his opponents and sometimes inheriting their lands, as was the case with Ladislaus, from whom he gained Lower Austria in 1457, and with his brother Albert VI, whom he succeeded in Upper Austria. In 1462, his brother Albert VI raised an insurrection against him in Vienna and the emperor was besieged in his residence by rebellious subjects. In this war between the brothers, Frederick received support from the King of Bohemia, George of Poděbrady. These conflicts forced him into an anachronistic itinerant existence, as he had to move his court between various places through the years, residing in Graz, Linz, and Wiener Neustadt. Wiener Neustadt owes him its castle and the "New Monastery". In 1469, Friedrich founded the Order of Saint George, which still exists today, whereby the first investiture in the Lateran Basilica in Rome was carried out by him and Pope Paul II.

The Ottoman conquest of Bosnia in 1463 brought their frontier closer to the Habsburg lands, setting the stage for more intense incursions. The Ottoman Turks raided Carniola in 1469 and launched almost annual raids into Styria after 1471. Carinthia saw five Turkish incursions into its territory between 1473 and 1483, with much plundering and killing at the hands of Ottoman cavalry. These raids led to the Carinthian Peasant Revolt of 1478, as peasants, left unprotected by the nobility, tried to defend themselves and formed a peasants' league to organise their own defense. The raids also prompted the construction of defensive structures like fortified churches and castles (tabor). In 1491, Ottoman raids in the Habsburg territories of Styria and Carniola ended after a significant defeat at the Battle of Vrpile.

Mary of Burgundy, sole heir to the rich Burgundian kingdom, after the death of her father Charles the Bold, soon made her choice among the many suitors for her hand by selecting Archduke Maximilian of Austria, the future Holy Roman Emperor Maximilian I (son of Frederick III) who became her co-ruler. With the inheritance of Burgundy, the House of Habsburg began to rise to predominance in Europe. This gave rise to the saying "Let others wage wars, but you, happy Austria, shall marry", which became a motto of the dynasty.

Frederick secured in 1486 the succession of his son in his own lifetime. On 16 February 1486, Maximilian was unanimously elected Roman-German king at the Frankfurt Reichstag by the six electors present. The Elector of Bohemia was not invited because the Bohemian vote might have been claimed by the Hungarian King Matthias Corvinus. There are still discussions regarding whether Frederick actively provided the initiative for his son's election or not. As Frederick's only surviving male heir though, Maximilian was a natural choice for Frederick and the Estates to counter Hungary's ambitions. On the occasion of the election of Maximilian, a ten-year land peace was decided. In order to safeguard the peace of the land and against the expansive territorial policy of the House of Wittelsbach, numerous affected empire-related states of Swabia joined in 1488 on Frederick's initiative for the Swabian League. After the royal election, Frederick accompanied his son to Aachen, where Maximilian was crowned on 9 April 1486. There seemed to be tensions between father and son due to differences in personalities and leadership styles. But Frederick saw Maximilian's values in negotiating with the Estates, thus even though he was wary of infringements on his imperial power, Maximilian quickly became an essential partner in imperial politics.

In 1487, his daughter Kunigunde married Albert IV, Duke of Bavaria. Albert illegally took control of some imperial fiefs and then asked to marry Kunigunde (who lived in Innsbruck, far from his father), offering to give her the fiefs as a dower. Frederick agreed at first, but after Albert took over yet another fief, Regensburg, Frederick withdrew his consent. On 2 January 1487, however, before Frederick's change of heart could be communicated to his daughter, Kunigunde married Albert. A war was prevented only through the mediation of the Emperor's son, Maximilian.

In some smaller matters, Frederick was quite successful: in 1469, he managed to establish bishoprics in Vienna and Wiener Neustadt, a step that no previous Duke of Austria had been able to achieve.

Frederick failed to gain control over Hungary and Bohemia in the Bohemian–Hungarian War. Frederick proclaimed himself King of Hungary on 27 February 1459, but this did not intimidate Matthias Corvinus. Frederick decided to invade, but his army never got far, as he was no general. From Mantua, Pius II (who was also Frederick's former secretary) urged the Emperor to leave Matthias alone. Hungary, he proclaimed, "is the shield of all Christendom under cover of which we have hitherto been safe. [...] If the road is thus opened to the barbarians, destruction will break in over all and the consequences of such a disaster will be imputed by God to its authors." Frederick was even defeated in the Austrian–Hungarian War by Matthias Corvinus in 1485, who managed to maintain residence in Vienna until his death five years later in the Siege of Vienna. Emperor Frederick failed to procure help from the Prince-electors and the Imperial States. In 1483, he had to leave his Hofburg residence in Vienna and fled to Wiener Neustadt, where he was also besieged by Matthias' troops for 18 months until the fortress was captured in 1487. Humiliated, Frederick III fled to Graz, and later to Linz in Upper Austria.

Frederick's personal motto was the mysterious string A.E.I.O.U., which he imprinted on all his belongings. He never explained its meaning, leading to many different interpretations being presented, although it has been claimed that shortly before his death, he said it stands for Austriae Est Imperare Orbi Universo or Alles Erdreich ist Österreich untertan ("All the world is subject to Austria"). It may well symbolise his own understanding of the historical importance and meaning of his rule and of the early gaining of the Imperial title.

Frederick had been very careful regarding the reform movement in the empire. For most of his reign, he considered reform as a threat to his imperial prerogatives. He avoided direct confrontation, which might lead to humiliation if the princes refused to give way. After 1440, the reform of the Empire and Church was sustained and led by local and regional powers, particularly the territorial princes. In his last years, however, there was more pressure on him to take action from a higher level. Berthold von Henneberg, the Archbishop of Mainz, who spoke on behalf of reform-minded princes (who wanted to reform the Empire without strengthening the imperial hand), capitalised on Frederick's desire to secure the imperial election for Maximilian. Thus, in his last years, he presided over the initial phase of Imperial Reform, which would mainly unfold under his son Maximilian. Maximilian himself was more open to reform, although naturally he also wanted to preserve and enhance imperial prerogatives. After Frederick retired to Linz in 1488, as a compromise, Maximilian acted as mediator between the princes and his father. When he attained sole rule after Frederick's death, he would continue this policy of brokerage, acting as the impartial judge between options suggested by the princes.

== Patronage of the arts ==
Frederick was an important and powerful patron of music, with a "preference for importing Western talent". This, combined with the efforts by non-courtly institutions like the Trento Cathedral, would contribute to the flourishing of music under Maximilian I.

The 110 books he collected form the core collection of the later Bibliotheca Regia, which was the predecessor of the later Imperial Library and the current Austrian National Library (Österreichische Nationalbibliothek).

In 1471, Frederick commissioned a set of mechanical astronomical instruments from the Nuremberg craftsman Erhard Etzlaub, including a portable astrolabe.

== Legacy ==
German historians tend to be more critical of Frederick than Austrian ones. Austrian historian Adam Wandruszka opines that while he was not an impressive emperor, Frederick III was effective in defending and expanding his family's dynastic interests. Wandruszka calls him the "true founder of the Habsburg imperial position". German historian Paul-Joachim Heinig (author of Kaiser Friedrich III. (1440–1493). Hof, Regierung und Politik, Böhlau, 1997) writes that it would be unfair to say that Maximilian stood on the shoulders of a giant, yet nevertheless Frederick provided the shoulders without which Maximilian could not have become a giant himself.

Frederick was a great benefactor to the Jews – his enemies described him as "more of a Jew than a Holy Roman Emperor". He favoured such Jewish scholars like Jacob ben Jehiel Loans, who was the teacher of the Hebraist Johann Reuchlin. His empress Eleanor also favoured Jews. For unknown reasons, their son Maximilian developed a dislike for the Jews as a child, though, to the horror of both parents. His own relationship with the Jews evolved over the years, though. Ursula Schattner-Rieser opines that the foundation of modern Judaism, arising in the eras of Frederick and Maximilian, was "embedded in the principles of humanism".

== Marriage and children ==
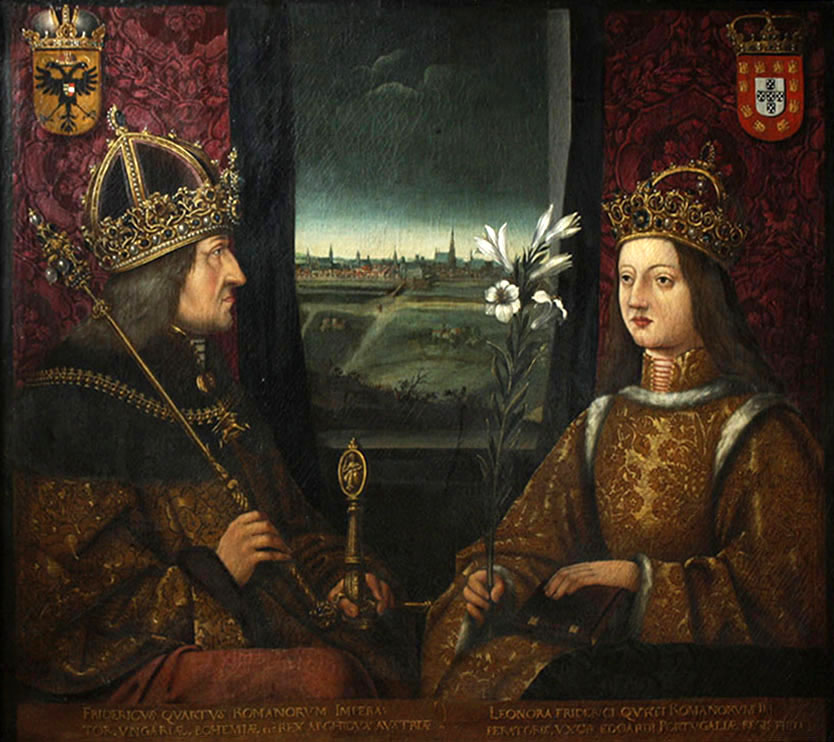
Frederick III and Eleanor of Portugal.

Frederick had 5 children from his marriage with Eleanor of Portugal, daughter of Edward, King of Portugal:

- Christoph (16 November 1455 – 21 March 1456);
- Maximilian (22 March 1459 – 12 January 1519), Holy Roman Emperor, married in 1477 Mary of Burgundy (1457–1482), daughter of Charles the Bold, Duke of Burgundy;
- Helene (3 November 1460 – 28 February 1462);
- Kunigunde (16 March 1465 – 6 August 1520), married in 1487 Albert IV, Duke of Bavaria
- Johannes (9 August 1466 – 10 February 1467).

For the last 10 years of Frederick's life, he and Maximilian ruled jointly.

== Death ==
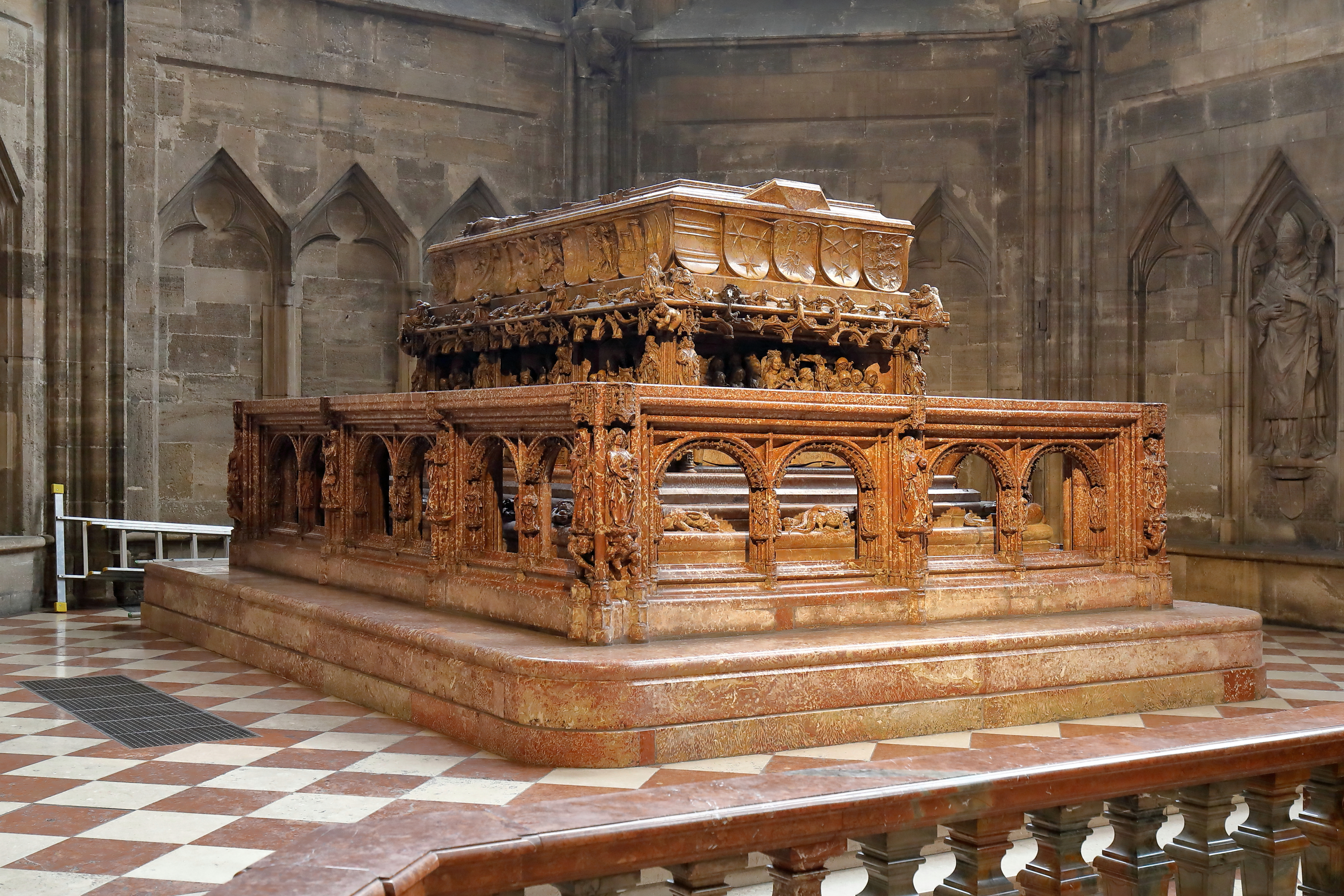
Frederick III's tomb, Vienna

In his last years Friedrich remained in the region on the Danube, in Vienna and in Linz. In 1492, he was elected Knight of the Order of the Golden Fleece. Starting in February 1493, Frederick's health deteriorated increasingly. During the Lent season of 1493, Friedrich's personal physicians diagnosed "age-burning" in the left leg from his symptoms, generally considered to be the result of arteriosclerosis. On 8 June 1493, the affected area of his leg was amputated under the direction of the surgeon Hans Seyff in the Linz Castle. This leg amputation is considered one of the most famous and best-documented surgical procedures of the entire Middle Ages.

Although Frederick initially survived the procedure well, he died on 19 August 1493 in Linz at the age of 77. The contemporaries cited as the cause of death the consequences of leg amputation, senility or rapid diarrhea caused by melon consumption. His bowels were probably buried separately on 24 August 1493 in the Linz parish church. The arrival of the Ottoman Turks in Carinthia and Carniola delayed the arrival of Maximilian and with it the funeral service. On 6 and 7 December 1493, the funeral took place in St. Stephen's Cathedral.

His grave, built by Nikolaus Gerhaert, in St. Stephen's Cathedral, is one of the most important works of sculptural art of the Late Middle Ages. (His amputated leg was buried with him.) The heavily adorned tomb was not completed until 1513, two decades after Frederick's death, and has survived in its original condition.

== Heraldry ==
Heraldry of Frederick III, Holy Roman Emperor

Coat of arms as Archduke and Duke of Inner Austria (Styria, Carinthia and Carniola)	Coat of arms as King of the Romans (1440–1493)	Coat of arms as Holy Roman Emperor (1452–1493)	Alternative coat of arms as Holy Roman Emperor (1452–1493)

== Male-line family tree ==
House of Habsburg

Original line
Albert; Count of Habsburg c. 1188–1239
Rudolf I of Germany c. 1218–1291
Albert I of Germany; 1255–1308	Hartmann; 1263–1281	Rudolf II; Duke of Austria; 1270–1290
Rudolf I of Bohemia; 1281–1307	Frederick the Fair c. 1289–1330	Leopold I Duke of Austria; 1290–1326	Albert II; Duke of Austria; 1298–1358	Henry the Friendly; 1299–1327	Otto; Duke of Austria; 1301–1339	John; Parricida c. 1290–1312/1313
Albertinian line	Leopoldian line
Rudolf IV; Duke of Austria; 1339–1365	Frederick III; 1347–1362	Albert III; Duke of Austria; 1349–1395	Leopold III; Duke of Austria; 1351–1386	Frederick II; Duke of Austria; 1327–1344	Leopold II; Duke of Austria; 1328–1344
Albert IV; Duke of Austria; 1377–1404	William; Duke of Austria c. 1370–1406	Leopold IV; Duke of Austria; 1371–1411	Ernest; Duke of Austria; 1377–1424	Frederick IV; Duke of Austria; 1382–1439
Albert II of Germany; 1397–1439	Frederick III; HRE; 1415–1493	Albert VI; Archduke of Austria; 1418–1463	Sigismund; Archduke of Austria; 1427–1496
Ladislaus the Posthumous; 1440–1457	Maximilian I HRE; 1459–1519
Philip I of Castile; 1478–1506
Spanish / Iberian line	Austrian / HRE line
Charles V HRE; 1500–1558	Ferdinand I HRE; 1503–1564
Philip II of Spain; 1527–1598	Maximilian II; HRE; 1527–1576	Ferdinand II; Archduke of Austria; 1529–1595	Charles II; Archduke of Austria; 1540–1590
Carlos; Prince of Asturias; 1545–1568	Philip III of Spain; 1578–1621	Rudolf II; HRE; 1552–1612	Ernest of Austria; 1553–1595	Matthias; HRE; 1557–1619	Maximilian III; Archduke of Austria; 1558–1618	Albert VII; Archduke of Austria; 1559–1621	Wenceslaus; Archduke of Austria; 1561–1578	Andrew; Margrave of Burgau; 1558–1600	Charles; Margrave of Burgau; 1560–1618	Ferdinand II; HRE; 1578–1637	Maximilian Ernest of Austria; 1583–1616	Leopold V Archduke of Austria; 1586–1632	Charles of Austria; 1590–1624
Philip IV of Spain; 1605–1665	Charles of Austria; 1607–1632	Ferdinand of Austria; 1609–1641	John-Charles of Austria; 1605–1619	Ferdinand III; HRE; 1608–1657	Leopold Wilhelm of Austria; 1614–1662	Ferdinand Charles; Archduke of Austria; 1628–1662	Sigismund Francis; Archduke of Austria; 1630–1665
Balthasar Charles; Prince of Asturias; 1629–1646	Charles II of Spain; 1661–1700	Ferdinand IV; King of the Romans; 1633–1654	Leopold I HRE; 1640–1705	Charles Joseph of Austria; 1649–1664
Joseph I HRE; 1678–1711	Charles VI; HRE; 1685–1740
Lorraine
Maria Theresa; HRE; 1740–1780	Francis I HRE; 1745–1765
Habsburg-Lorraine
Joseph II; HRE; 1765–1790	Leopold II; HRE; 1790–1792
Francis II; HRE; 1792–1806

== Bibliography ==
- Rickett, Richard (1966). A Brief Survey of Austrian History. Georg Prachner Verlag.
- Heinig, Paul-Joachim. "The Court of Emperor Frederick III". In Princes Patronage and the Nobility: The Court at the Beginning of the Modern Age, cc. 1450–1650. Edited by Ronald G. Asch and Adolf M. Birke. New York: Oxford University Press, 1991. ISBN 0-19-920502-7.
- Langmaier, Konstantin M. Erzherzog Albrecht VI. von Österreich (1418–1463), ein Fürst im Spannungsfeld von Dynastie, Regionen und Reich (Forschungen zur Kaiser- und Papstgeschichte des Mittelalters, Beihefte zu J. F. Böhmer, Regesta Imperii 38, Köln, Weimar, Wien 2015).
- Langmaier, Konstantin M. Kaiser Friedrich III. (1415–1493): des Reiches Erzschlafmütze? Der "schlafende Kaiser" als Klischee. In: Zeitschrift des Historischen Vereins für Steiermark. 111, 2020, 129–188 (currently the most scientific and modern study on Frederick III).

Frederick III, Holy Roman Emperor House of Habsburg Born: 21 September 1415 Died: 19 August 1493
Regnal titles
Preceded by Albert II of Germany	King of the Romans (informally King of Germany); 1440 – 1493	Succeeded by Maximilian I, Holy Roman Emperor
Preceded by Sigismund, Holy Roman Emperor	Holy Roman Emperor; 1452 – 1493	Succeeded by Maximilian I, Holy Roman Emperor
Preceded by Ernest, Duke of Austria	Duke of Styria, Carinthia and Carniola; 1424 – 1493 with Albert VI, Archduke of Austria 1424 – 1463	Succeeded by Maximilian I, Holy Roman Emperor
Preceded by Ladislaus the Posthumous	Archduke of Austria; 1457 – 1493 with Albert VI, Archduke of Austria 1457 – 1463	Succeeded by Maximilian I, Holy Roman Emperor
