= Linz Castle (Austria) =

Castle in Linz, Austria

Coordinates: 48.3057°N 14.2823°E

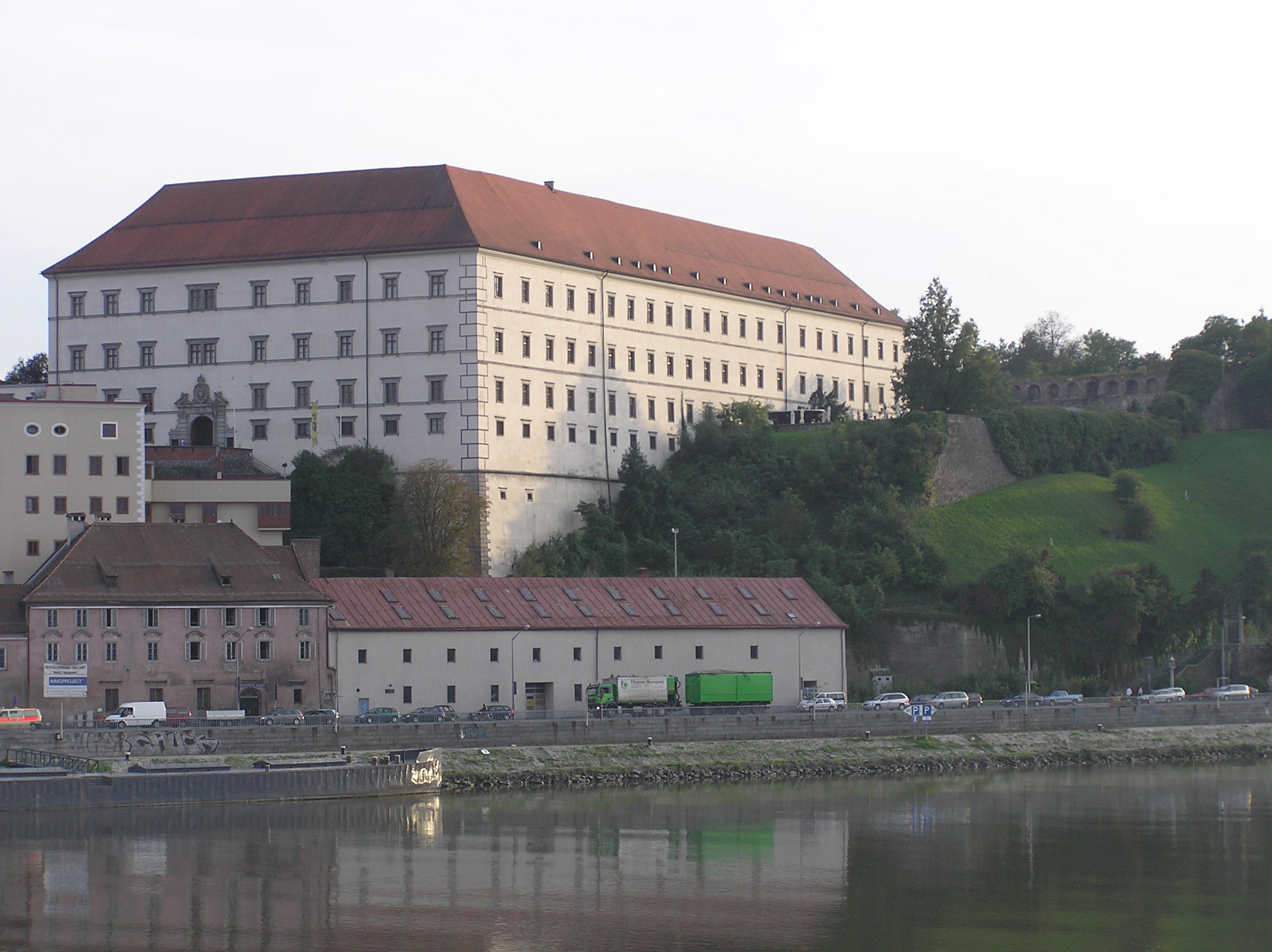
Linz Castle

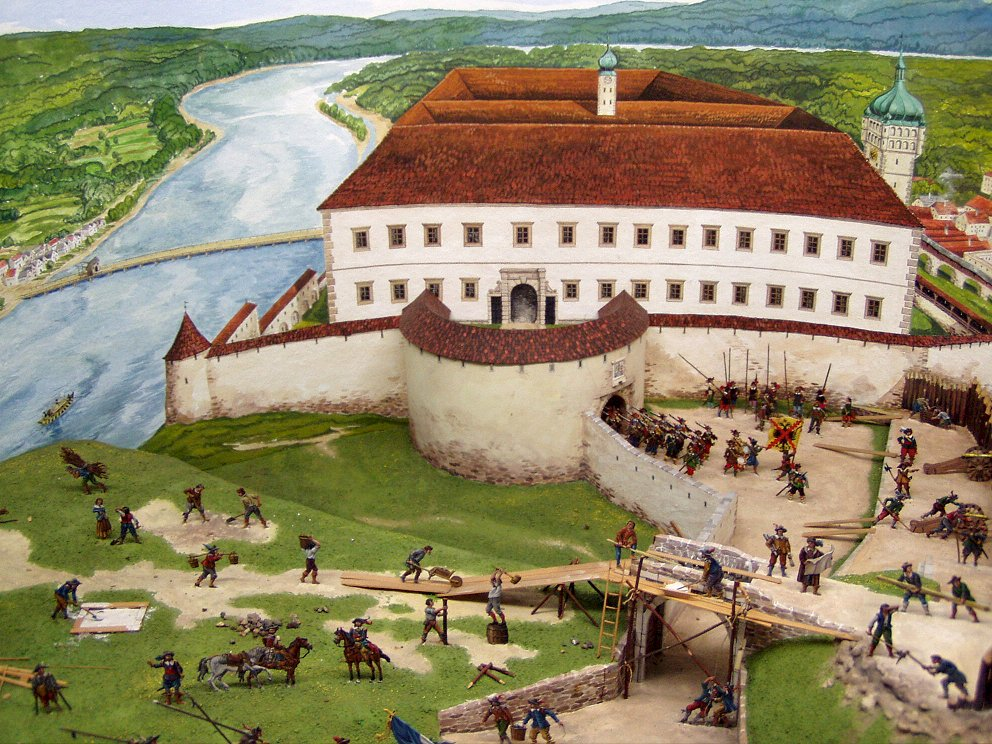
Fortification at Linz Castle - Tin figure diorama from the Peuerbach Peasant War Museum

Linz Castle (Linzer Schloss) is located on a hill above the old town district of Linz, Austria, directly on the Danube.

== History ==
=== Early history ===
The castle was built on the site of the former Roman fort of Lentia. The first known mention dates back to June 20, 799.

Until around 1150, the Lords of Linz resided here as feudal lords of the High Bishopric of Passau, under the sovereignty of the Dukes of Bavaria. Around the middle of the 12th century, Passau expanded Ebelsberg Castle to become its base in the Linz area. It was probably around this time that the Haunsperg family, as successors to the Lords of Linz, took over the Passau fiefdom of Linz. In 1205/1206, the Babenberg Duke Leopold VI of Austria and Styria acquired the emerging city of Linz and its castle from Gottschalk II von Haunsperg.

=== Imperial residence ===
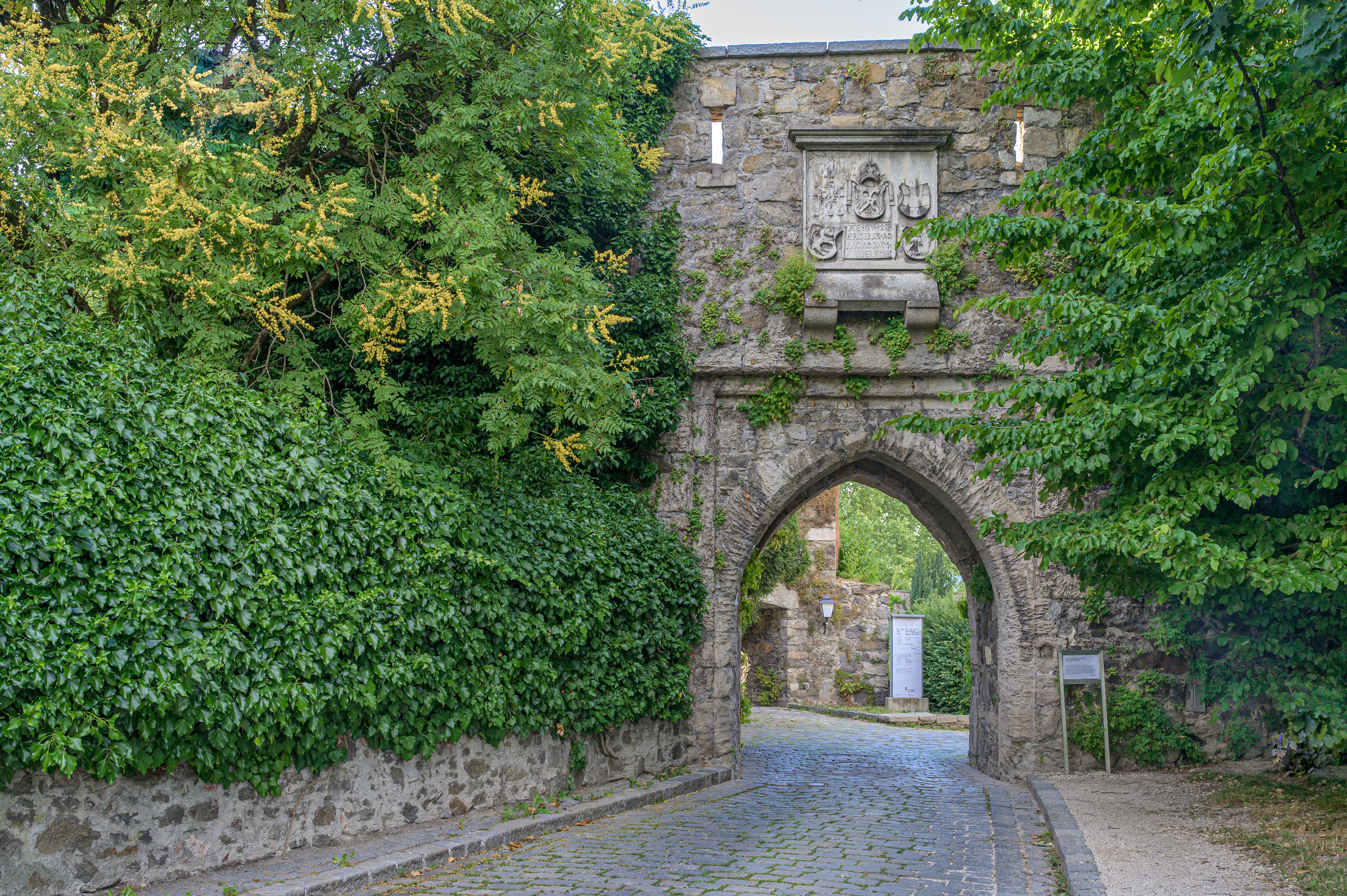
Frederick Gate with the coat of arms stone and the inscription "A.E.I.O.U."

Under Emperor Frederick III, the castle was converted into a palace in 1477 and served as his residence from 1489 to 1493. The Frederick Gate, which is still preserved today, dates from this period. His son Maximilian I often stayed in Linz and in the castle. His grandson, the future Emperor Ferdinand I, had the palace extended and lavishly furnished for his wife Anne of Bohemia and Hungary after their wedding in Linz. Their children Elisabeth (1526) and Ferdinand II (1529) were born in Linz Palace. After separating from her husband, the Polish King Sigismund II. August, their daughter Catherine lived in Linz Palace with her servants from October 1567 until her death in 1572.

=== Rudolf's Castle ===
Emperor Rudolf II had the palace demolished and rebuilt in 1600 according to plans by the Dutch master builder Anton de Moys from Antwerp, who had been court architect in Vienna from 1581. In addition to the mighty four-storey block building with two inner courtyards, the main gate to the city (Rudolf Gate, 1604) was also built.

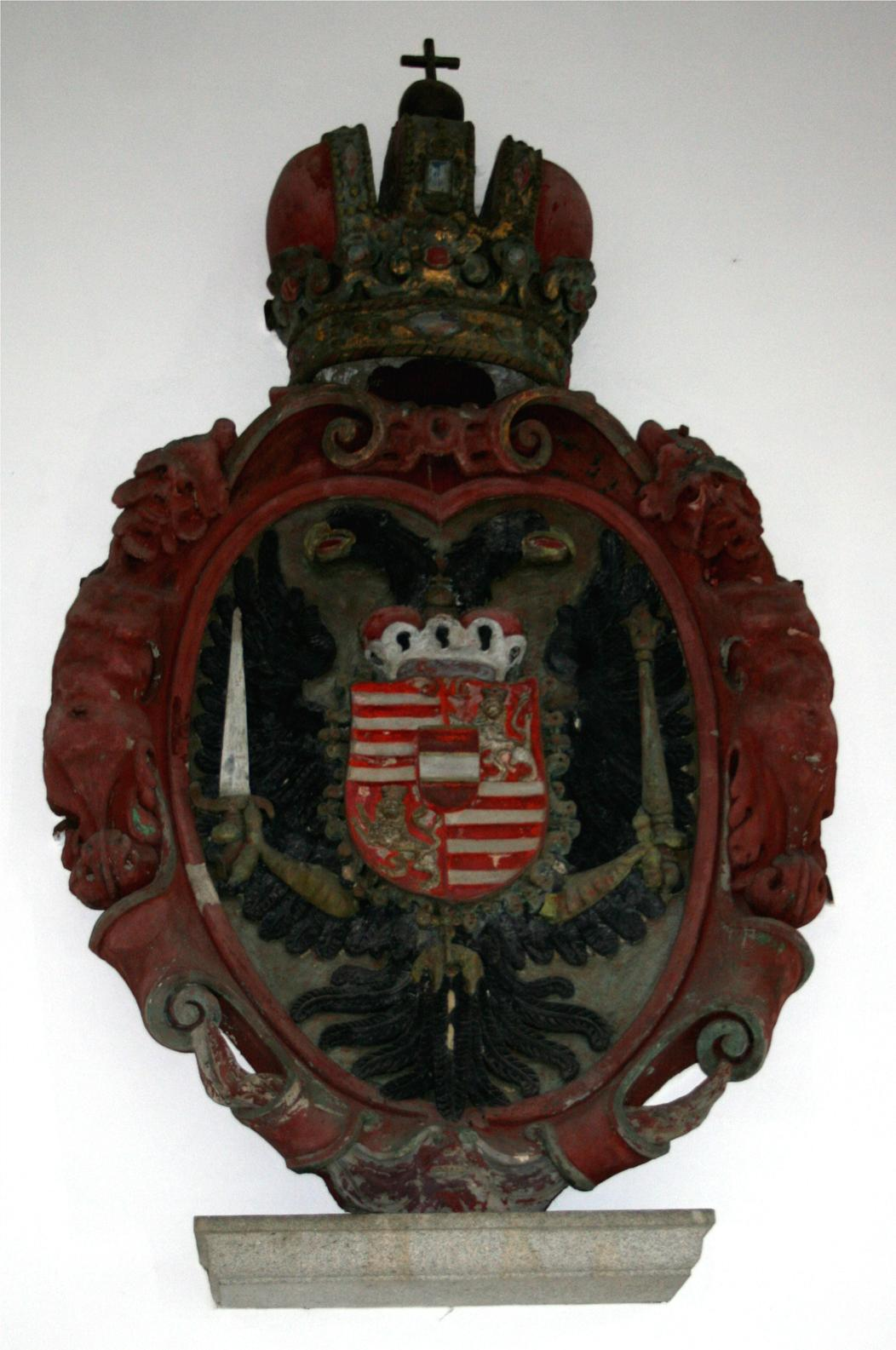
Coat of arms with the imperial crown of Rudolf II in the passageway of the former chapel wing

During the Bavarian rule from 1620 to 1628, Count Adam von Herberstorff resided in the castle as governor. He strengthened the fortifications around the castle in anticipation of an imminent siege by the peasants. In 1626, the castle was besieged by the rebellious peasants.

During the plague in Vienna, Emperor Ferdinand III and the court stayed in Linz Palace from 1644 to 1646. Emperor Leopold I resided there during the Second Siege of Vienna by the Turks in 1683.

In 1783, the provincial governor moved his offices from the palace to the Linz Landhaus.

During the Napoleonic Wars, the palace served as a military hospital. The city fire in 1800 started from here. The south wing and part of the transverse wing were destroyed. Faced with the question of what to do with the badly damaged building, it was decided to relocate the penitentiary in the abandoned Baumgartenberg Abbey here.

In 1811, a modern provincial penitentiary was put into operation, in which the convicts were employed in the production of cloth, drill and cloth of various kinds. The closure of the Linz wool factory and the associated loss of the wool combing and spinning mill operated in the penitentiary may have contributed to the relocation of the prison to Garsten Abbey in 1851, which was also abolished by Joseph II.

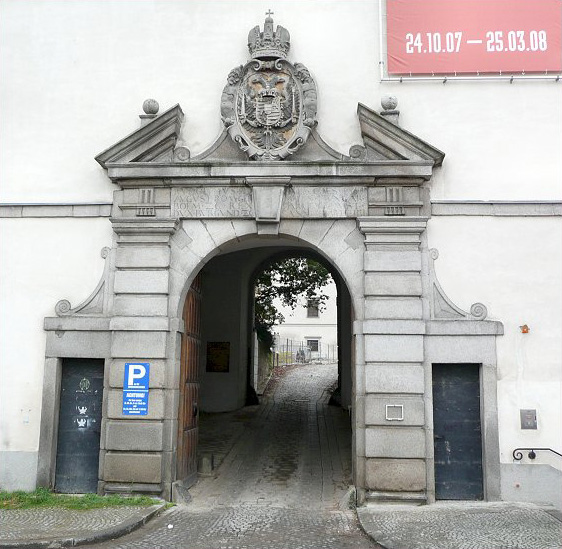
Rudolf Gate

From 1851 to 1945, the castle served as barracks for soldiers. Between 1953 and 1963, the building was extended and restored to become the Castle Museum of the Upper Austrian Provincial Museums.

== Schlossberg ==
The castle park to the west of the fortification wall and above the castle is commonly referred to as Schlossberg. This is part of the Römerberg, after which the road tunnel from Sandgasse to the Danube is named, and which runs as a ridge westwards to the Freinberg.

Linz's new music theater was originally supposed to be built into the mountain near the castle on the Danube side. The project was rejected in an Upper Austrian referendum initiated by the FPÖ on November 26, 2000.

== Architecture ==
=== Castle ===
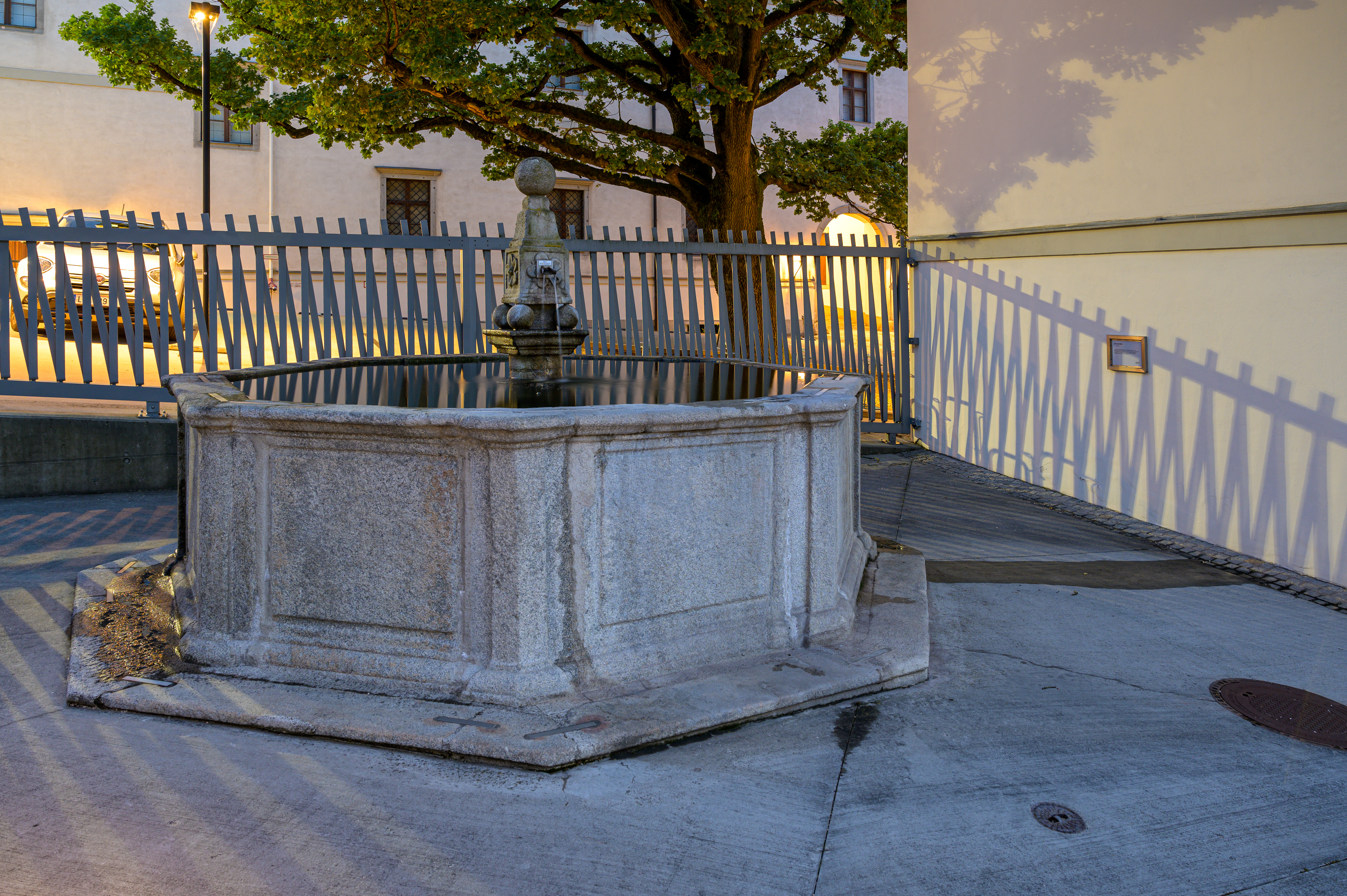
Fountain in the large courtyard

Towards the rising Schlossberg plateau stands a massive bastion suitable for protection, consisting of ramparts, a deep moat and tower-flanked curtain walls. A traffic circle protects the first gate, behind which an angled path leads through the pointed-arched Friedrich Gate with a coat of arms stone bearing the date 1481 and the well-known inscription A.E.I.O.U. (the original is in the north wing of the castle museum).

The four-storey block building has two inner courtyards.

The Rudolf Gate, built in 1604, leads down into the old town of Linz.

=== South wing ===
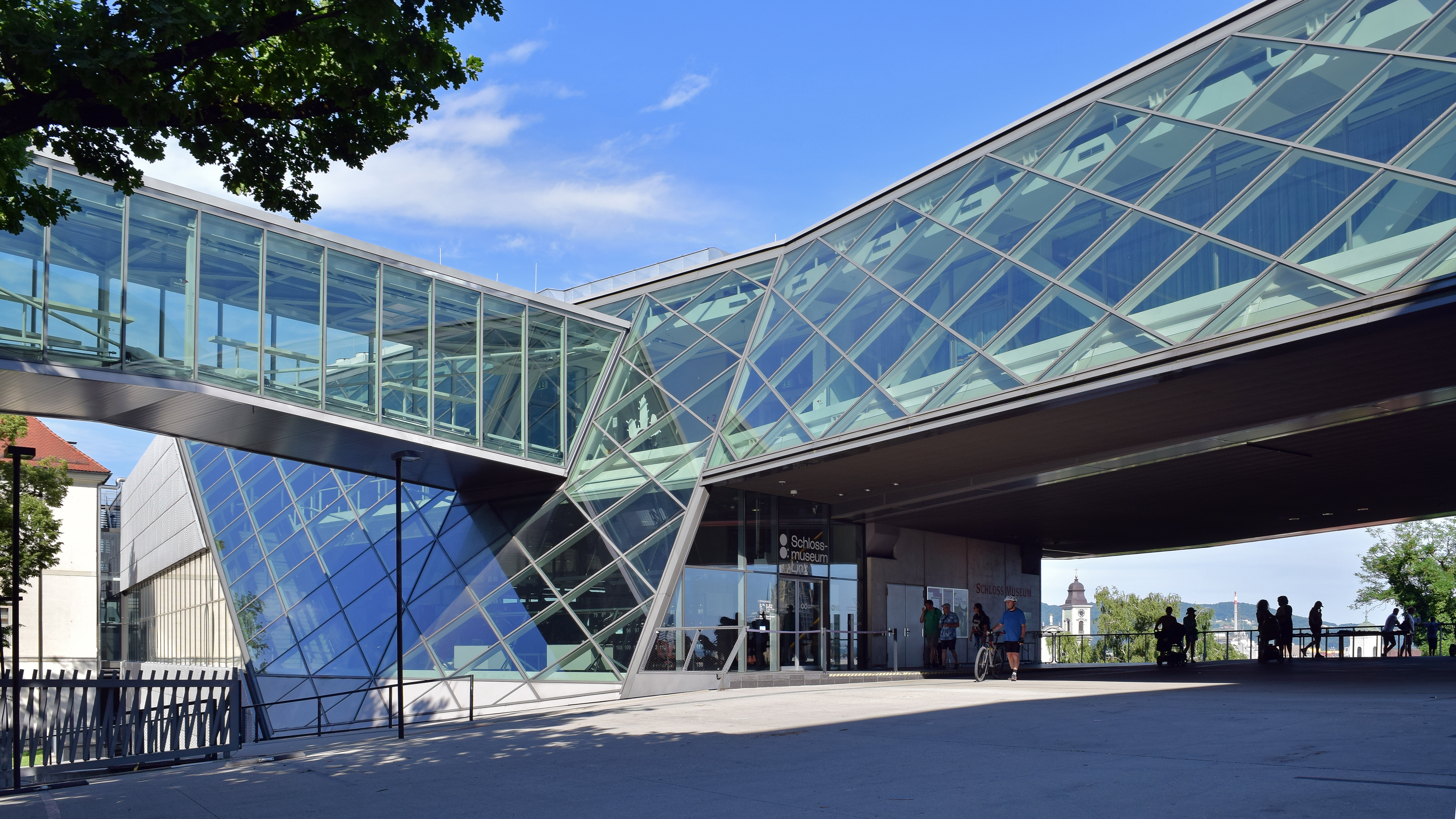
New south wing (Emmerer and Luser, 2011)

In 2006, an architectural competition was held for the new construction of the south wing, which was burnt down in 1800 (this wing faces the south-east and represents a slightly angled rectangular side of the castle's ground plan on the steep slope of the hill). Of the 109 projects submitted, the one by the Graz-based architecture firm HoG architektur (Martin Emmerer, Clemens Luser and Hansjörg Luser) was the winner. The new south wing, which was realized as a steel and glass structure and cost 24 million euros to build, will be used to expand the palace museum. In the summer of 2006, archaeological excavations were carried out on the future building site.

A room filled with sand and fine rubble after the great fire of August 18, 1800, except for an escape tunnel, was excavated and explored from summer 2006. In the hall, which is now up to 9 m high, are the remains of a round tower with a diameter of 9.5 m from the beginning of the 16th century and therefore before the castle was rebuilt.

== Castle Museum ==
=== History of the museum ===
The castle museum was partially opened in the north wing of the old castle in 1963, with the complete opening taking place in 1966. It initially housed historical and ethnographic collections. Permanent exhibitions also include historical weapons, historical musical instruments and old coins. There are also regular special exhibitions. Open-air events were and are occasionally held in the castle courtyard.

The new south wing (rebuilding of the part of the castle that burnt down in 1800) houses the castle's technical history and natural science collections after completion in July 2009. The so-called "buried room" that was uncovered at the time was opened on November 3–4, 2011 with the symposium "Giving Space to the Buried - A Remembrance Update" and houses the permanent exhibition on the fate of Jews, Sinti and Roma.

The new south wing of the palace and the ground floor of the north wing have also provided space for art exhibitions since they were redesigned and rebuilt in 2009 and have been used for a variety of purposes since then, including an exhibition by Brigitte Kowanz in 2022.

=== Collections ===
- Kastner art collection: The foundation was laid in 1975 by the donation of the lawyer Walther Kastner with the condition that it be presented as a unified collection. Over time, the collection grew from its original 323 works to over 1400 objects. It includes sculptures from the Middle Ages, 17th century Dutch paintings and Austrian paintings from the Biedermeier period to Expressionism. The collection is presented in three rooms, the anteroom contains an introduction.
- Art collection 12th-18th century
- Coin Cabinet: The coin collection offers an overview of numismatics in Upper Austria. On display are coins found in Celtic settlements, medieval coins such as those from the Linz mint, medals from Upper Austria from the 16th century onwards and treasure finds such as the Fuchsenhof treasure discovered in 1997.
- Collection of musical instruments
- Nature Upper Austria: This exhibition presents the formation of Upper Austria's landscapes and the diversity of its living creatures.
- Online Collections: Over 200,000 photographs, historical views of places etc. are available online.
- Technical Upper Austria: In addition to the technical history collection (astronomy, Museum Physicum and study collection), the Upper Austrian industrial, economic and technical history is also presented.
- Traditional cribs: The crib from Garsten Abbey with almost life-size figures from around 1730 and a mechanical crib from the workshop of Johann Georg Schwanthaler stand out from the collection of around 70 different cribs.
- Folklore & everyday culture: A cross-section of the arts and crafts and folk art of the 18th and 19th centuries. Also on display are reverse glass paintings from Sandl.
- Weapons collection: historical cutting and stabbing weapons as well as firearms
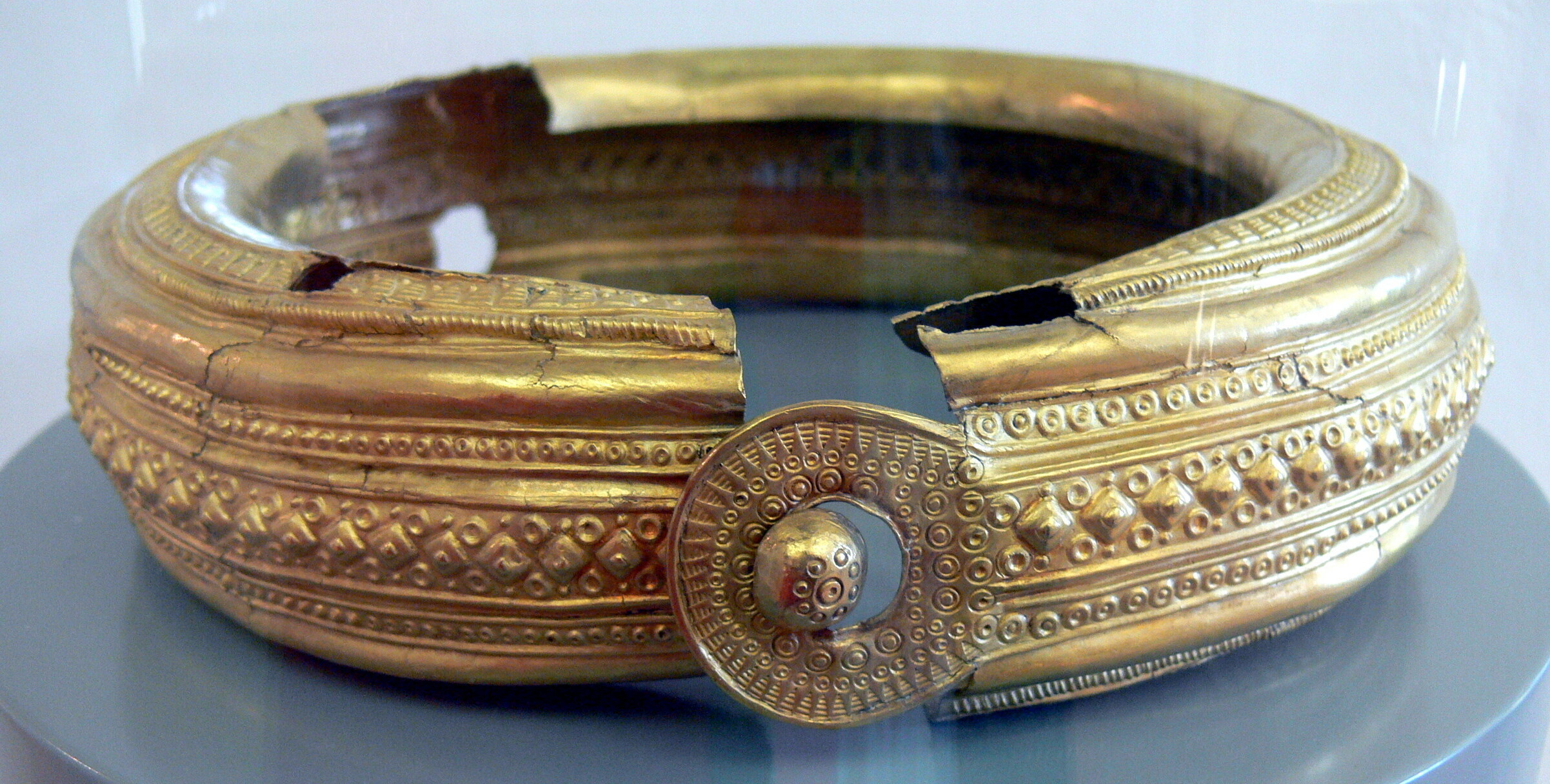
  Gold necklace from Uttendorf

=== Important exhibits ===
The museum's most important exhibits include (by date of origin):

- Female statuette from the Neolithic settlement of Ölkam, around 4800 BC
- Gold neck ring from the Hallstatt period settlement of Uttendorf, around 550 BC
- Latène period beaked jug from Mining-Sunzing, around 450 BC
- Treasure find from Fuchsenhof, 1st century BC, buried around 1275/78, discovered in 1997
- Crusader sword of Kalhoch (Chadeloh) von Falkenstein, 4th quarter of the 12th century
- Eggelsberger Altar from the former pilgrimage church of Eggelsberg, dated 1481
- Adoration of the Magi by the Master of Mondsee, around 1490/93 (further wing paintings of the former Mondsee Altarpiece can be found in the Belvedere)
- Johannesschüssel by the Master of the Kefermarkt Altarpiece, around 1500
- Tiled stove from Würting Castle, around 1560
- Swords of the Linz city magistrates, 1598 and 1659 and Marchtrenk cradle, 1702
- Portal from Hartheim Castle, after 1598
- Franz Nikolaus Pernlohner: Karte der Traun von ihrem Ursprung bis zur Mündung in die Donau. Around 1688 (scale 1:4,400, 2264(!)cm long and 38 cm high).
- Baroque apothecary from Weinberg Castle, around 1700
- Fortepiano by Ludwig van Beethoven, built in 1803 by Sébastien Érard Frères, Paris
- Johann Baptist Reiter: Die Emanzipierte. Portrait of Louise Aston. Oil on canvas, around 1847
- Hans Makart: Die Japanerin. Oil on mahogany, around 1873/75
- Meteorite from Prambachkirchen, November 5, 1932
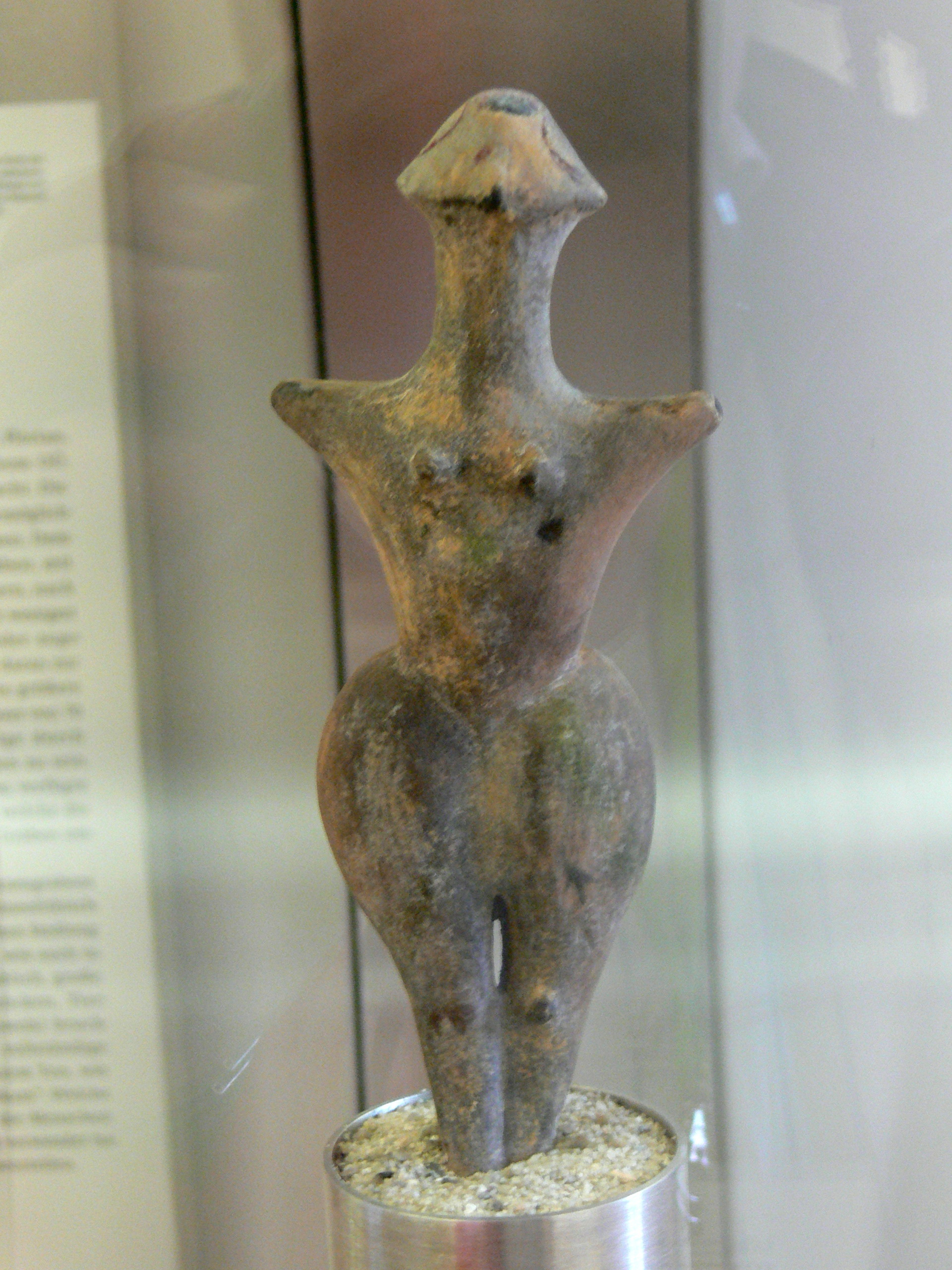
  Venus of Ölkam
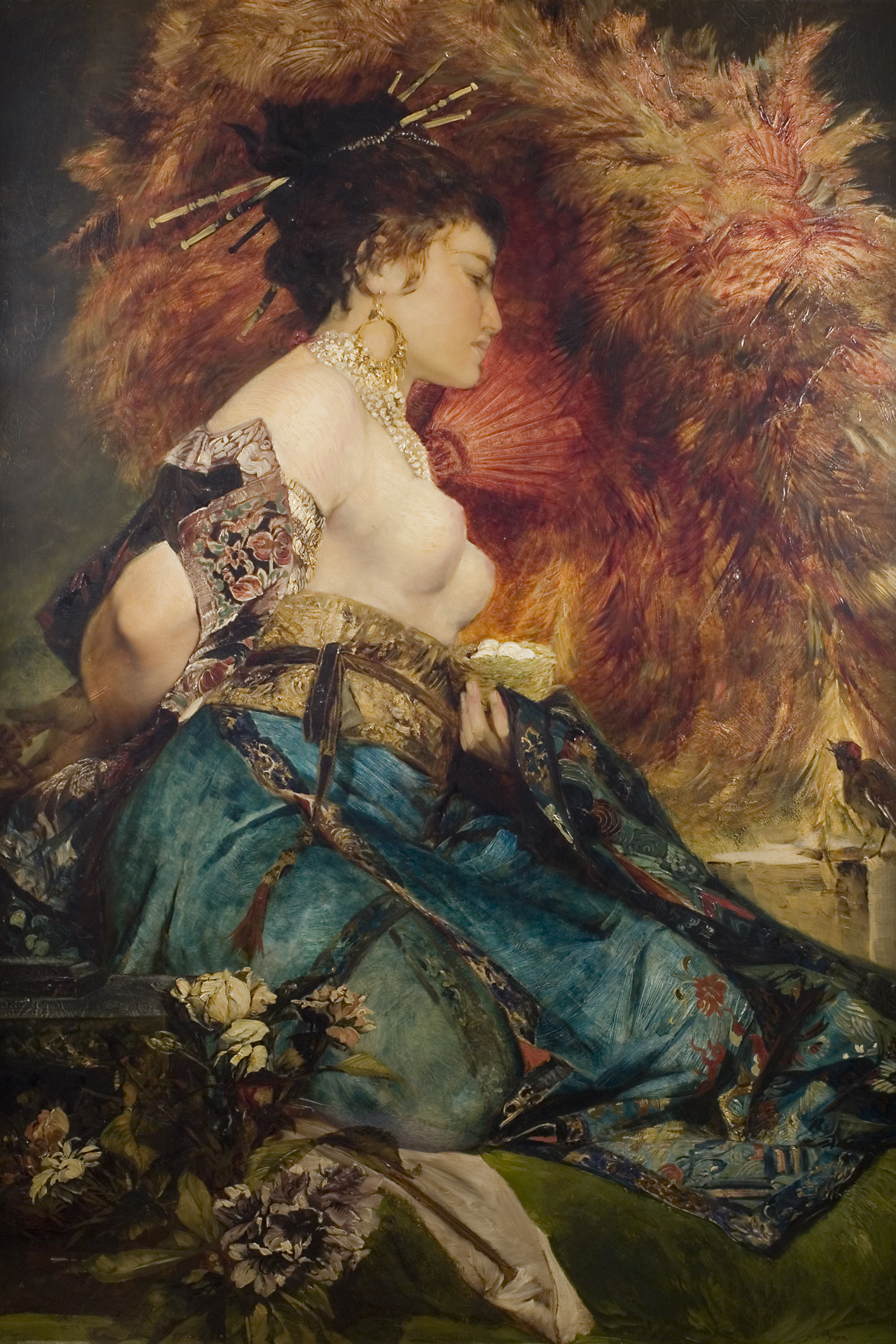
  Die Japanerin by Hans Makart

== Bibliography ==
- Justus Schmidt: Kulturgeschichte des Linzer Schlosses. In: Das Museum im Linzer Schloß. Festkatalog, Linz 1963, pp. 19–69 (zobodat.at [PDF]).
- Justus Schmidt: Zur Geschichte des Schlosses. Linz 1978, pp. 21–26 (zobodat.at [PDF]).
- Benno Ulm: Das Schloßmuseum zu Linz. Von der Burg zum Museum. In: Sonderband 150 Jahre Oberösterreichisches Landesmuseum, Oberösterreichischer Musealverein. Linz 1983, pp. 55–70 (zobodat.at [PDF]).
- Gerda Ridler (ed.), Bernhard Prokisch (ed.): Schlossmuseum Linz. Schätze aus Oberösterreich. Linz 2016, ISBN 978-3-99028-534-3
