= Jean Margain =

French Hebraist

- Born: Jean Fleury Marie Margain; 24 February 1931; 4th arrondissement of Lyon
- Died: 15 February 2012 (aged 80); Melun
- Education: Doctor of Arts
- Alma mater: Sorbonne Nouvelle University
- Occupation: Editor, philologist
- Position held: Director of Research at CNRS (1988–), director of studies (1991–1996)

Jean Margain (24 February 1931 - 15 February 2012) was a French Hebraist. He is known by his Semitic and Samaritan studies.

== Life ==
=== Education ===
Margain got his Doctor of Arts in 1988 with his thesis Les particules dans le Targum samaritain de Genèse-Exode: jalons pour une histoire de l'araméen samaritain at Université Paris III.

=== Academic work ===
In 1981, CNRS researchers Christian Amphoux and Jean Margain founded the Académie des Langues Anciennes (formerly called Session des Langues Bibliques), with branches in Montpellier, Saintes, Lille, Lyon and Digne.

Margain was Director of research at the French National Centre for Scientific Research (CNRS) and president of the Sessions de langues bibliques (in 1988). He also was Director of studies at École Pratique des Hautes Études (EPHE), and Chair of Biblical and Targoumic Philology, from 1991 to 1996.

== Selected works ==
- Les particules dans le Targum samaritain de Genèse-Exode: jalons pour une histoire de l'araméen samaritain. Droz, Genève. 1993. ISBN 9782600033282.
- Le livre de Daniel: commentaire philologique du texte araméen. Beauchesne, Paris 1994. ISBN 2-7010-1318-6
- Jean Margain; Dominique de La Maisonneuve; Jacob Weingreen; Sessions de langues bibliques (Montpellier) (1997). Hébreu biblique: méthode élémentaire = A practical grammar for classical Hebrew / Corrigés des exercices / par Dominique de la Maisonneuve; sous la direction de Jean Margain,...; [publié par les] Sessions de langues bibliques. Les classiques bibliques Beauchesne. Paris: Beauchesne, DL. ISBN 9782701011622. OCLC 1089772599.

== Literature ==
- Albert Frey (1998). Christian-Bernard Amphoux; Albert Frey; Ursula Schattner-Rieser (eds.). Etudes sémitiques et samaritaines offertes à Jean Margain. Histoire du texte biblique. Vol. 4. Lausanne: Editions du Zèbre. ISBN 9782970008866. OCLC 42294657.
