= 1440 imperial election =

Holy Roman imperial election

- 2 February 1440

6 Prince-electors (Note: The seventh electoral vote, belonging to the King of Bohemia, was uncast as the throne was vacant. The previous king, Albert II, had died in October 1439, and his posthumous son and heir, Ladislaus the Posthumous, was not born until 22 February 1440.) 4 votes needed to win
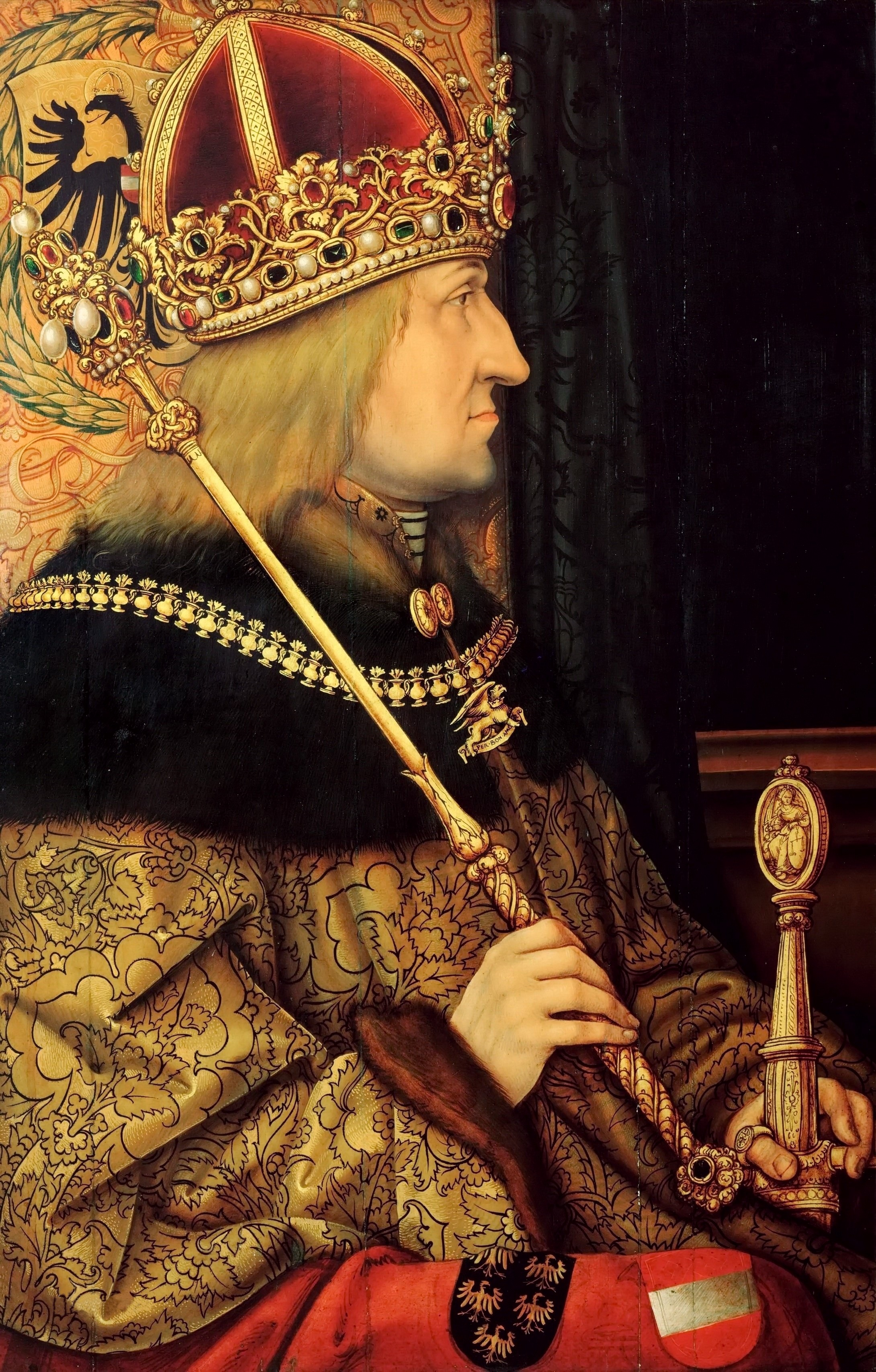
Candidate	Frederick III
House	Habsburg
Electoral vote	6
Percentage	100%
King before election
Albert II
House of Habsburg
Elected King
Frederick III
House of Habsburg

The imperial election of 1440 was an imperial election held to select the emperor of the Holy Roman Empire. It took place in Frankfurt on February 2.

== Background ==
Albert II of Germany, King-elect of Germany, died on October 27, 1439. The prince-electors convened to replace him were:

- Dietrich Schenk von Erbach, elector of Mainz
- James of Sierk, elector of Trier
- Dietrich II of Moers, elector of Cologne
- Louis IV, elector of the Electoral Palatinate
- Frederick II, elector of Saxony
- Frederick I, elector of Brandenburg

The throne of Bohemia was vacant. Albert was king of Bohemia and his firstborn son Ladislaus the Posthumous would not be born until February 22.

== Elected ==
Frederick, duke of Styria, Carinthia and Carniola and regent of Austria, was elected.

== Aftermath ==
Frederick III was crowned in Rome by the pope on March 19, 1452. He was the lineal ancestor of all subsequent emperors of the House of Habsburg.
