= Ursula Schattner-Rieser =

French-Austrian scholar of Jewish studies

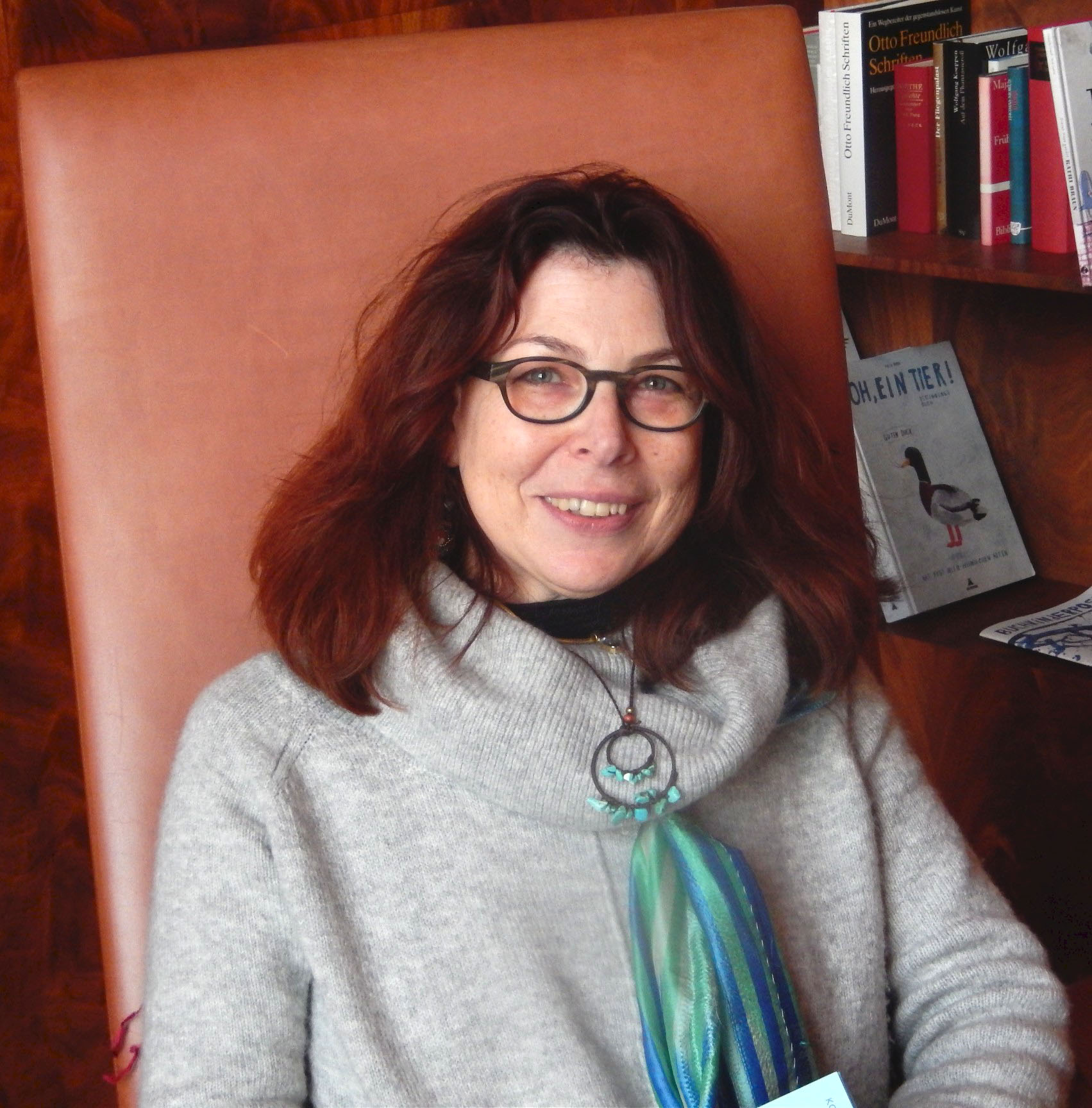
- Born: 1966 (age 59–60)

Academic background
- Education: École pratique des hautes études; University of Paris VIII; Ecole du Louvre/Paris; Institut Catholique de Paris

Academic work
- Discipline: Jewish studies
- Institutions: Institut Catholique de Paris; University of Innsbruck
- Main interests: Semitic linguistics

Ursula Schattner-Rieser (born in 1966) is a French-Austrian scholar of Jewish studies, specializing in Semitic linguistics within the framework of Afro-Asiatic Linguistics, the Dead Sea Scrolls, and Samaritan Studies.

== Early life and education ==
Schattner-Rieser was born in 1966 in Austria. She received most of her education in Paris, with additional education in Vienna and Jerusalem. She began her Jewish Studies in Vienna, where she was mentored by Kurt Schubert and Günter Stemberger. From 1987 to 1991, she pursued studies in History of the Ancient Near East, Semitic Philology, and General Linguistics at the École pratique des hautes études (EPHE-Sorbonne) and the University of Paris VIII. Additionally, she studied epigraphy at the Ecole du Louvre/Paris and the École des Langues Orientales Anciennes (E.L.C.O.A) of the Institut Catholique de Paris (ICP) and EPHE-Sorbonne from 1987 to 1998. She completed her doctoral studies under the supervision of the epigrapher and biblical scholar André Lemaire and Jean Margain, a scholar of Semitic Philology at the Sorbonne. She holds a PhD from the EPHE-Sorbonne (1998). She completed her linguistic studies with André Martinet, Claude Hagège and Henriette Walter at the philological-historical section (IV) of the EPHE. It was there that she received her historical-philological diploma as an “élève de l’École” in 2001 and was granted the license to teach as a university professor for ancient oriental philology (Langues et Littératures Orientales) and Jewish studies. She received her habilitation in Hebrew and Aramaic Literature and Languages in 2010.

== Career ==
From 1996 to 2011, she served as a professor of Comparative Semitics, specializing in Northwest-Semitic, Aramaic, and Samaritan Studies at the Institute for Oriental Languages and Civilizations (ELCOA) at the Catholique University of Paris (ICP), rue d’Assas. Additionally, from 2002 to 2011, she lectured on Hebrew and Aramaic Philology as well as the Dead Sea Scrolls at the École Pratique des Hautes Études (EPHE) at the University Sorbonne in Paris, France. She has held various academic positions including Visiting Professorships at the University of Zurich, Researcher for Medieval Hebrew Book-Bindings in Mainz, Guest Lecturer at the Rashi Institute of Troyes/France, Professor of Ancient Judaism and leader of the Martin-Buber-Institute for Jewish Studies in Cologne/Germany, Research Assistant at the University of Innsbruck and Salzburg, and visiting professor at the Hochschule für Jüdische Studien in Heidelberg.

Since 2021, she has been appointed at Prof. Ivo Hajnal's Institute of Linguistics at the University of Innsbruck, where she works as Privatdozent and Senior Researcher, teaching Semitic Languages and coordinating the bachelor's Program “Ancient Near Eastern Languages” in cooperation with Prof. Robert Rollinger's Department of Ancient History and Ancient Oriental Studies at the University of Innsbruck - Center for Ancient Cultures. Her research interests include the interaction between Linguistics and Religion (Theolinguistics), Semitic Linguistics and Gender, as well as the origin and power of Language and script(s) and their consequences and Impact in Culture and Religions.

She serves as the Project Leader of the Database of a bundle of hundred Hebrew Contracts of the medieval Jewish Community of Cologne, Jewish Schreinbook of Cologne Nr. 107 (JSB Database).

== Scientific work ==
Her research interests and focus are on Qumran studies and research of the Dead Sea manuscripts, post-exilic biblical studies, the Old Testament and Samaritan studies, and medieval Hebraica fragments in book bindings

Her Semitic studies include Hebrew and Aramaic linguistics, ancient Judaism and primitive and early Christianity, as well as comparative religious studies. Her personal interest lies in interreligious cultural exchange between Judaism, Christianity and Islam.

She is involved in joint works and publications on the Samaritans with Jörg Frey, Konrad Schmid (theologian) and Christian-Bernard Amphoux and collaborations with Emanuel Tov, Daniel Stökl Ben Ezra, Katell Berthelot and Daniel Smith on the manuscripts of the dead Sea, Qumran, prayers and Aramaic at the time of Jesus.

Ursula Schattner-Rieser's work on the Lord's Prayer has received great scholarly attention. Using the Aramaic texts from Qumran "the Middle Aramaic-Palestinian phase", she has made a new back translation or reconstruction of the original Aramaic prayer, which differs in a number of details from the widespread retroversions in Kuhn and Jeremias.

== Honors ==
In July 2005, she was elected a Corresponding Fellow (Membres associés libres) of the French National Academy of Metz, which is one of the 16 academies for the humanities and social sciences. She won several research awards in Paris, France and Innsbruck, Austria.

== Publications ==
For a complete list of her publications, please refer to her academia profile

Monographies

- Schattner-Rieser, U. (2004). L'Araméen des manuscrits de la mer Morte, I. Grammaire. Instruments pour l'étude des langues de l'Orient ancien. Vol. 5. Editions du Zèbre, Lausanne. ISBN 2-940351-03-1.
- ————————— (2005). Textes araméens de la mer Morte. Édition bilingue, vocalisée et commentée. Langues et cultures anciennes. Vol. 5. Éditions Safran, Bruxelles. ISBN 2-87457-001-X.
- ————————— (2010). Échos du passé araméen. Témoignages épigraphiques par rapport à la tradition hébraïque et juive (professorial dissertation). Paris.
- Schattner-Rieser U. (2024), Die Judaica- und Hebraica-Sammlung der Synagoge Innsbruck, Agentur Gitterle, Imst-Innsbruck. ISBN 978-3-200-09964-7

Editorship

- Schattner-Rieser, U.; Amphoux, Christian-B.; Frey, A., eds. (1998). Etudes sémitiques et samaritaines offertes à Jean Margain. HTB. Vol. 3. Lausanne: Editions du Zèbre. ISBN 2-9700088-6-6. Archived from the original on 2024-05-22.
- —————————; Frey, J.; Schmid, K., eds. (2012). Die Samaritaner und die Bibel / The Samaritans and the Bible. Historische und literarische Wechselwirkungen zwischen biblischen und samaritanischen Traditionen / Historical and Literary Interactions between Biblical and Samaritan Traditions. Studia Samaritana. Vol. 7. Berlin: De Gruyter. doi:10.1515/9783110294361. ISBN 2-87457-001-X.
- —————————; Pérès, J. N., eds. (2013). "Les églises d'Éthiopie. Cultures et échanges culturels/Die Kirchen Äthiopien. Kultur und Kulturaustausch. Actes du Colloque de l'Institut Supérieur d'Études Oecuméniques du 21-22 octobre 2010 à Paris". Journal of Eastern Christian Studies. 64. Louvain: Peeters. ISSN 1783-1555.
- —————————; Oesch, Josef M., eds. (2018). 700 Jahre jüdische Präsenz in Tirol. Neue literarische und kulturhistorische Erkenntnisse. University Press Innsbruck, iup. ISBN 978-3-903122-77-2.

== Sources ==
- Grappe, Christian (2005). "Ursula Schattner-Rieser, L'araméen des manuscrits de la mer Morte. I. Grammaire, (Instruments pour l'étude des langues de l'Orient ancien 5) Prahins, Éditions du Zèbre, 2004". Revue d'Histoire et de Philosophie religieuses. 85 (3): 430–431.
