= Dominique de La Maisonneuve =

- Education: Hebrew University of Jerusalem
- Occupations: Teacher, writer
- Employer: Catholic University of Paris
- Awards: Prix de l'Amitié judéo-chrétienne de France (2012)

Dominique de La Maisonneuve is a French Sister of Congregation of Our Lady of Sion and professor at the Catholic University of Paris.

== Life ==
Dominique de La Maisonneuve graduated from the Hebrew University of Jerusalem in 1977. From 1977 to 1998, she was a professor of Biblical Hebrew at the Catholic University of Paris.

She is a member of SIDIC - Service d'Information et de Documentation Juifs-Chrétiens - charged since the Second Vatican Council with passing on to the Christian people the teachings of the Church, inaugurated by the Declaration Nostra aetate, concerning the Jewish people.

== Awards ==
- 2012, Prix de l'Amitié judéo-chrétienne de France.
- 2018, Medal of Diocesan Merit

== Works ==
- De La Maisonneuve, Dominique; Avril, Anne Catherine (1985-12-01). Parábolas rabínicas. Documentos en torno a la Biblia (in Spanish). Translated by Darrical, Nicolás. Spain: Editorial Verbo Divino. ISBN 978-84-7151-452-3.
- De La Maisonneuve, Dominique (1990-03-19). Oraciones judías. Documentos en torno a la Biblia (in Spanish). Spain: Editorial Verbo Divino. ISBN 978-84-7151-652-7.
- De La Maisonneuve, Dominique; Avril, Anne Catherine (1993-11-30). Les fêtes juives. Cahiers Evangile (in French). Éditions du Cerf. ISBN 220437086X.
  - De La Maisonneuve, Dominique; Avril, Anne Catherine (1996-02-19). Las fiestas judías. Documentos en torno a la Biblia (in Spanish). Spain: Editorial Verbo Divino. ISBN 978-84-8169-028-6.
- De La Maisonneuve, Dominique; Weingreen, J.; Margain, Jean (1997-07-09). Hebreu Biblique. Methode Elementaire, Corriges Des Exercices: 13. Les Classiques Bibliques (in French). Editions Beauchesne. ISBN 2-7010-1162-0.
- De La Maisonneuve, Dominique (1998-01-13). Le judaïsme. Editions de l'Atelier. ISBN 2-7082-3332-7.
  - De La Maisonneuve, Dominique (2017-01-26). Le judaïsme. Éditions de l'Atelier. ISBN 9782708250895.
- De La Maisonneuve, Dominique (1999-05-27). Le Judaïsme, la vie du peuple de Jésus. parole de dieu (in French). Le Livre Ouvert. ISBN 2-907429-67-1.
  - De La Maisonneuve, Dominique (2002-12-31). Le Judaïsme, la vie du peuple de Jésus (in French). Mame. ISBN 9782728901678.
- De La Maisonneuve, Dominique (2010-04-01). La Torah vient des cieux: Introduction au sens du langage biblique. Paris: Parole et Silence. ISBN 9782845738430.
- De La Maisonneuve, Dominique (2018-06-13). Histoire du SIDIC. Documents Essai. Paris: Parole et silence. ISBN 978-2-88918-425-5.
