= Lo Boièr =

Occitan traditional song

Lo Boièr ("The Oxherd", also known as Le Bouvier in French) is an Occitan traditional song. It was popular in Languedoc during the Late Middle Ages, being particularly associated to the religious movement of Catharism. It might have developed during the Albigensian Crusade, when Cathar beliefs were declared forbidden.

Along with Se Canta, it is possibly the most known old Occitan song. It was studied by Gérard de Sède and performed by artists like Corou de Berra, Jean-Bernard Plantevin, André Ricros and Gacha Empega. It was also utilized by Radio Toulouse during World War II as a resistance song.

== Characteristics ==
Lo Boièr is a song with a slow, alternate rhythm. The third verse of every stanza is a mantric-sounding succession of vowels as a sort of refrain. The song's lyrics tells the story of an oxherd who finds his wife ill and tries to comfort her with food, which the woman replies to by serenely explaining the way she wants to be buried after she dies.

The song's imagery is rooted in Cathar symbolism. The oxherd's wife is named Joana, a female version of the name given to Cathar believers before entering spiritual life, and is described as "disconsolate," implying she has not received the rite of consolamentum yet. The meal mentioned contains a radish ("raba", in Occitan), a cabbage ("caulet") and a lean lark ("magra"), referencing the noble families of Rabastens, Caulet and Magrin, protectors of Catharism. Finally, Joana asks to be buried with her head under the fountain, symbolizing the water received in the consolamentum, and mentions a herd of goats, echoing a Gnostic tradition that links Capricorn to the spirit's return to heaven.

In Gnosticism, the vowels are considered a form of the name of the Monad, much like the Hebrew tetragrammaton. Examples of this and similar vowel usage is found in the Nag Hamadi library. Some have suggested that they form a phonic pyramid pointing to heaven. Others believe its true meaning is lost.

== Lyrics ==
The following is the most popular form of the song's lyrics.

Occitan	English
Quand lo boièr ven de laurar (bis); Planta son agulhada A, e, i, ò, u! Planta son agulhada. Trapa (Tròba) sa femna al pè del fuòc (bis); Trista e (Tota) desconsolada. A, e, i, ò, u! Trista e (Tota) desconsolada. Se siás (Se n'es) malauta diga z-o (bis); Te farai un potatge (una alhada); A, e, i, ò, u! Te farai un potatge (una alhada) Amb una raba, amb un caulet (bis); Una lauseta magra. A, e, i, ò, u! Una lauseta magra. Quand serai mòrta enterratz-me (rebomb-me) (bis); Al pus fons (Al prigond) de la cròta (cava); A, e, i, ò, u! Al pus fons (Al prigond) de la cròta (cava) Los pés virats (Met-me los pès) a la paret (bis); La tèsta a la rajada (Lo cap jos la canela); A, e, i, ò, u! La tèsta a la rajada (Lo cap jos la canela) Los pelegrins (E los romius) que passaràn (bis); Prendràn d'aiga senhada. A, e, i, ò, u! Prendràn d'aiga senhada. E diràn «Qual es mòrt aicí?» (bis); Aquò es la paura Joana. A, e, i, ò, u! Aquò es la paura Joana. Se n'es anada al paradís (bis); Al cèl ambe sas cabras. A, e, i, ò, u! Al cèl ambe sas cabras.	When the oxherd returns from work (bis) plants his plow on the ground. A, e, i, o, u. Plants his plow on the ground. He finds his wife by the fire (bis) sad and disconsolate. A, e, i, o, u. Sad and disconsolate. "If you are ill, tell me, (bis) so I will cook a potage for you A, e, i, o, u. So I will cook a potage for you. With a radish, a cabbage (bis) and a lean lark. A, e, i, o, u. And a lean lark." "When I'm dead, bury me (bis) in the deepest of the basement. A, e, i, o, u. In the deepest of the basement." With my feet towards the wall (bis) and my head towards the fountain. A, e, i, o, u. And my head towards the fountain. When pilgrims pass by (bis) they will take Holy Water. A, e, i, o, u. They will take Holy Water. And will ask «who is buried here?» (bis); It's the poor Joana. A, e, i, o, u. It's the poor Joana. She went to the paradise, (bis) to heaven alongside her goats. A, e, i, o, u. to heaven alongside her goats."

== In popular culture ==
In his 1998 novel Le Christi, René-Victor Pilhes mentions the song, interpreting its vowels as Austriae est imperare orbi universo.

In the webcomic Lost My Boots Out Wandering, the chapter named Dawn directly references Lo Boièr.
