= A.E.I.O.U. =

Habsburg motto

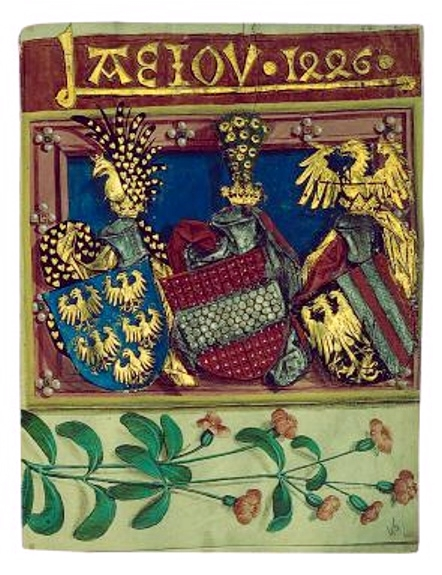
Illumination from the records of King Frederick, dated 1446

"A.E.I.O.U." (sometimes spelled A.E.I.O.V.) was a symbolic device coined by Emperor Frederick III (1415–1493) and historically used as a motto by the Habsburgs. One note in his notebook (discovered in 1666), though not in the same hand, explains it in German and Latin as "All the world is subject to Austria" (Alles Erdreich ist Oesterreich untertan or Austriae est imperare orbi universo). Frederick habitually signed buildings such as Santa Maria dell'Anima in Rome, Burg Wiener Neustadt, or Graz Cathedral as well as his tableware and other objects with the vowel graphemes. A.E.I.O.U. is also the motto of the Theresian Military Academy, established in 1751. It can also be found on the wall of the Chancellor's office in the Federal Chancellery of Austria. The famous device is probably the most known motto of premodern times, because it has repeatedly been given new interpretations. Unraveling the mystery of what the A.E.I.O.U. means is part of a centuries-long debate that is still ongoing today.

Contemporary research has shown that the Roman chancellery of Frederick III used the interpretation En amor electis iniustis ordinor ultor. Sic Fridericus ego mea iura rego as the official motto. This interpretation has also been shown to be the most commonly used variant in the 15th century. It was also supposed that the Austriae est imperare variants probably go back to Frederick's proto-notary Heinrich Leubing.

== Interpretation ==
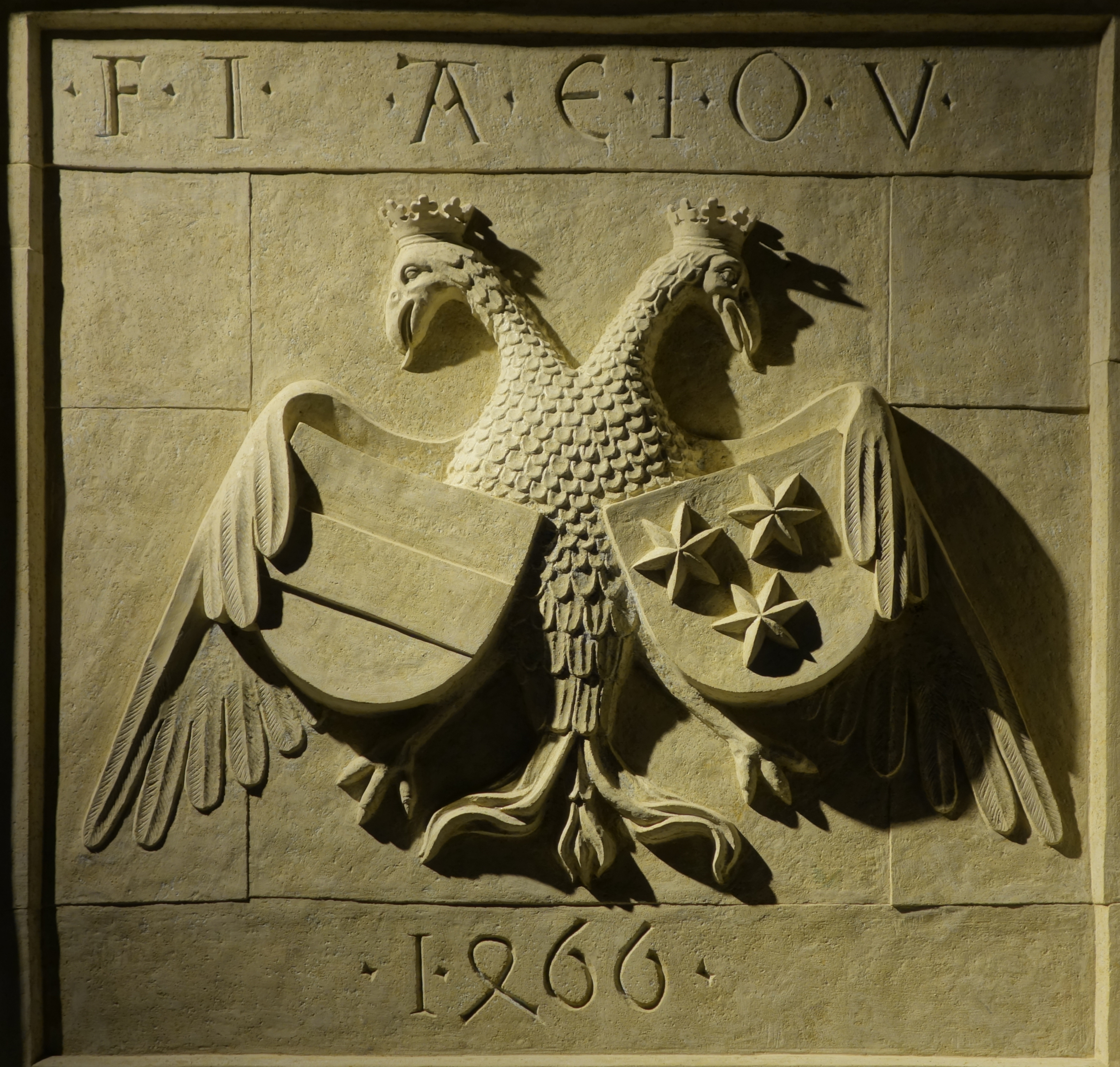
Heraldic plaque dated to 1466 with Habsburg motto F.I. A.E.I.O.U. Left part is Habsburg fesse coat of arms and right part is Counts of Celje coat of arms, united under Imperial double-headed eagle

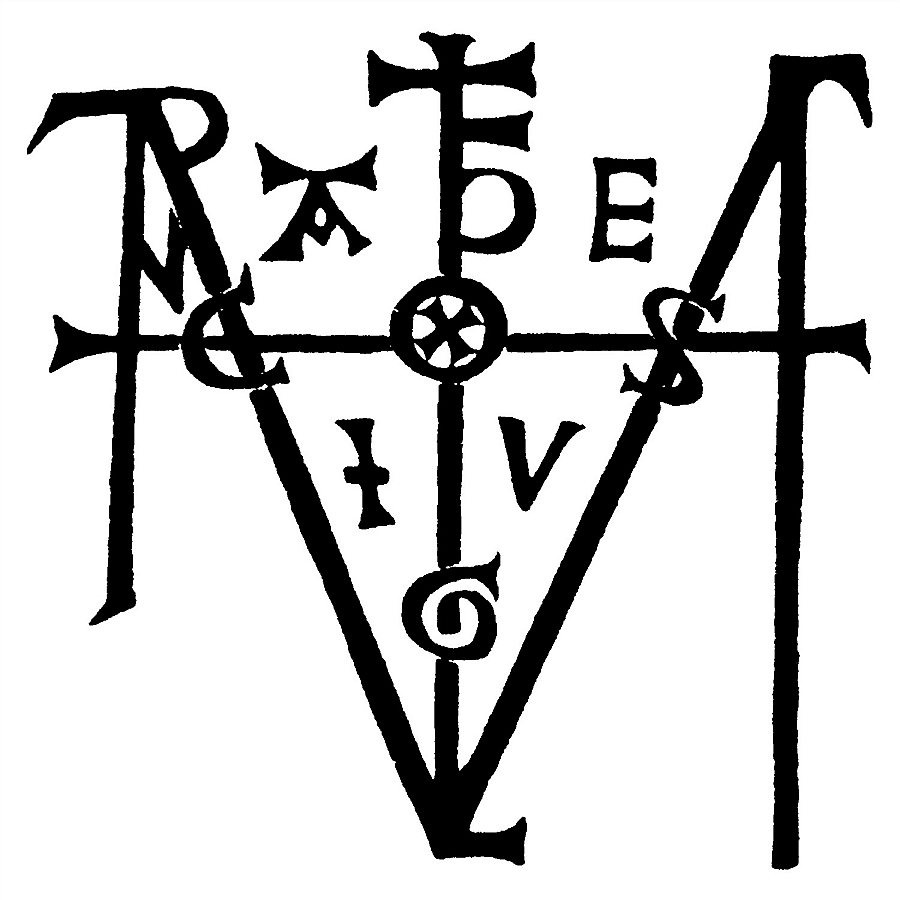
A.E.I.O.U. monogram of Frederick III

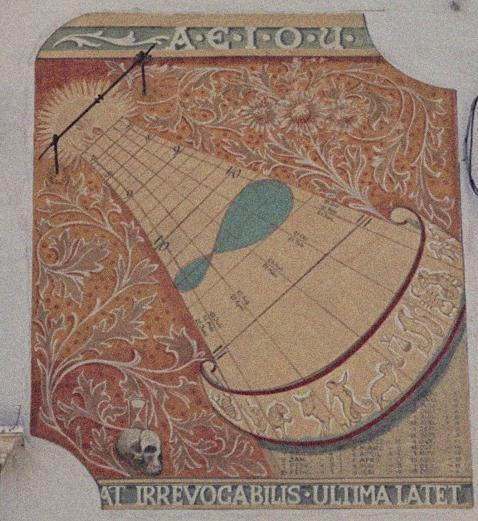
Sundial in Meran (now Italy) featuring an A.E.I.O.U. inscription

Frederick's first use of the five-letter monogram was in 1437, when he was Duke of Styria. One note in his notebook (discovered in 1666), though not in the same hand, explains it in German and Latin as "All the world is subject to Austria" (Alles Erdreich ist Österreich untertan or Austriae est imperare orbi universo).

Another passage, later in the same notebook, uses the letters in sequence as the initial letters of the words in the first line of a couplet poem, amor electis, iniustis ordinor ultor ("I am loved by the elect, for the unjust I am ordained an avenger"). This verse was probably adopted by Frederick from a poem by Nicolaus Petschacher of Znaim who worked as a court official in the 1440s.

Other interpretations have been put forth, including by contemporary heraldists. Several explanations proceed on the assumption that it was meant as a political slogan.

- Austria est imperio optime unita (Latin for "Austria is best united by the Empire").
- Austria erit in orbe ultima ("Austria will be supreme in the world", sometimes incorrectly given as "Austria will be the last (surviving) in the world").
- Aquila electa iusta omnia vincit ("The chosen eagle conquers all with justice").
- Alle ere ist ob uns (Middle High German for "All honor is upon us").

Since Frederick wrote this acronym when he was not yet the ruler of the Archduchy of Austria and, at that time, Styria was entirely separated from Austria and was not considered to be its part until the next century, the term "Austria" in this context would not mean Austria as a territory or a nation, but rather the "House of Austria", that is, the Habsburg dynasty.

Many Latin and German interpretations have been attempted over the centuries; most of these versions refer to a motto of present-day Austria or the extensive Habsburg monarchy.

== See also ==
- Fiat iustitia, et pereat mundus – motto of Ferdinand I
- FERT – another motto of a European dynasty (the House of Savoy) whose meaning and origin is unclear
- Plus ultra – the personal motto of Charles V and I, and through him the modern motto of Spain
- Austrian Empire
- Universal monarchy
- Sator Square
- Pax Austriaca
- Lo Boièr
- Vowel
