= Christian Amphoux =

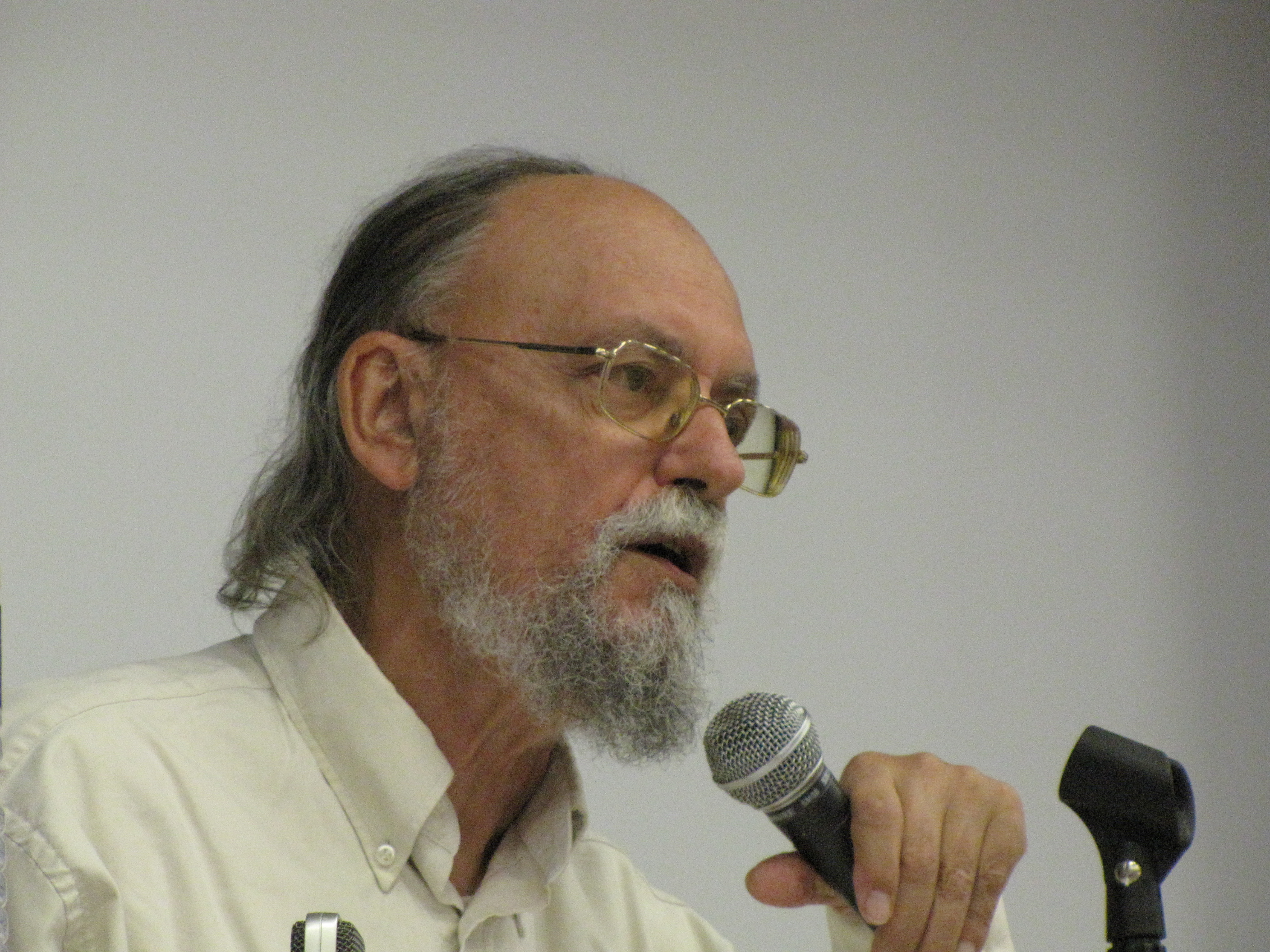
- Born: July 17, 1943 (age 83); Vannes, France

Academic background
- Education: University of Paris IV
- Thesis: Le texte des épîtres catholiques: essais de classement des états de texte, préparatoires à une histoire du texte de ces épîtres'

Academic work
- Discipline: philology
- Institutions: French National Centre for Scientific Research; Catholic Faculty of Theology
- Main interests: New Testament Greek

Christian-Bernard Amphoux (born July 17, 1943, in Vannes) is an honorary researcher in Greek philology at the French National Centre for Scientific Research and former director of the Académie des langues anciennes de Saintes (1981–1999).

== Biography ==
He studied classics in Rennes (1961–1962), then in Montpellier (1962–1967), where he obtained the agrégation in grammar. He became a high school teacher in several cities, while studying New Testament Greek. He studied textual criticism with Jean Duplacy and collaborated on an international project for a critical edition of the New Testament.

In 1974, he became a researcher at the CNRS, and in 1975 was awarded a lectureship in textual criticism and New Testament Greek at the Faculty of Protestant Theology in Montpellier. In 1981, under the supervision of Jean Irigoin and Jean Duplacy, he defended a post-graduate thesis at the University of Paris IV, entitled Le texte des épîtres catholiques: essais de classement des états de texte, préparatoires à une histoire du texte de ces épîtres.

In 1982, he was awarded a lectureship in New Testament textual criticism at the Catholic Faculty of Theology in Lyon, while in Montpellier (1989–1993) he headed a CNRS team, GDR 797, for research into New Testament texts. He is attached to the Greek section of the Institut de recherche et d'histoire des textes (IRHT). He retired in 2008, and now organizes training courses on early Christianity and the relationship between religion and society.

== Commitment to institutions and associations ==
With Jean Margain, he helped found a summer school for the teaching and dissemination of the languages of the Bible and the Christian East, first at the Protestant Faculty of Theology in Montpellier (1981–1985), then in Saintes (1986–1999), under the name Académie des Langues Anciennes. In June 1994, with David Charles Parker, he edited the proceedings of a symposium on the Codex Bezae held in Lunel in 1994. In 1996, with Bernard Outtier, he founded the Histoire du texte biblique (HTB) collection, published by Editions du Zèbre. As a theologian, he contributes to the Corpus Christi and L'Origine du christianisme series, directed by Gérard Mordillat and Jérôme Prieur.

== Sources ==
- Bordreuil, Pierre (2015). "Christian-Bernard Amphoux". In Cabanel, Patrick; Encrevé, André (eds.). Dictionnaire biographique des protestants français de 1787 à nos jours. Vol. 1: A-C. Paris: Les Éditions de Paris Max Chaleil. pp. 55–56. ISBN 978-2846211901.
- Vaganay, L; Amphoux, C-B (1991). "Foreword to the English translation by J. K. Elliott. Heimerdinger J, trans". An Introduction to New Testament Textual Criticism. Cambridge: Cambridge University Press. pp. xiii–xvi. doi:10.1017/CBO9780511621451.001.
- Centre Paul Albert-Février. "Amphoux Christian".
- Pinchard, Laurent; Haelewyck, Jean-Claude, eds. (2023). Traditions et Traductions des textes bibliques. Études de critique textuelle et d'exégèse en l'honneur de Christian-Bernard Amphoux à l'occasion de son 80e anniversaire. Langues et cultures anciennes (LCA). Vol. 35. ISBN 978-2-87457-142-8.
