= Pongrác Szentmiklósi =

Pongrác Szent-miklós
- High Bailiff of the County of Liptov
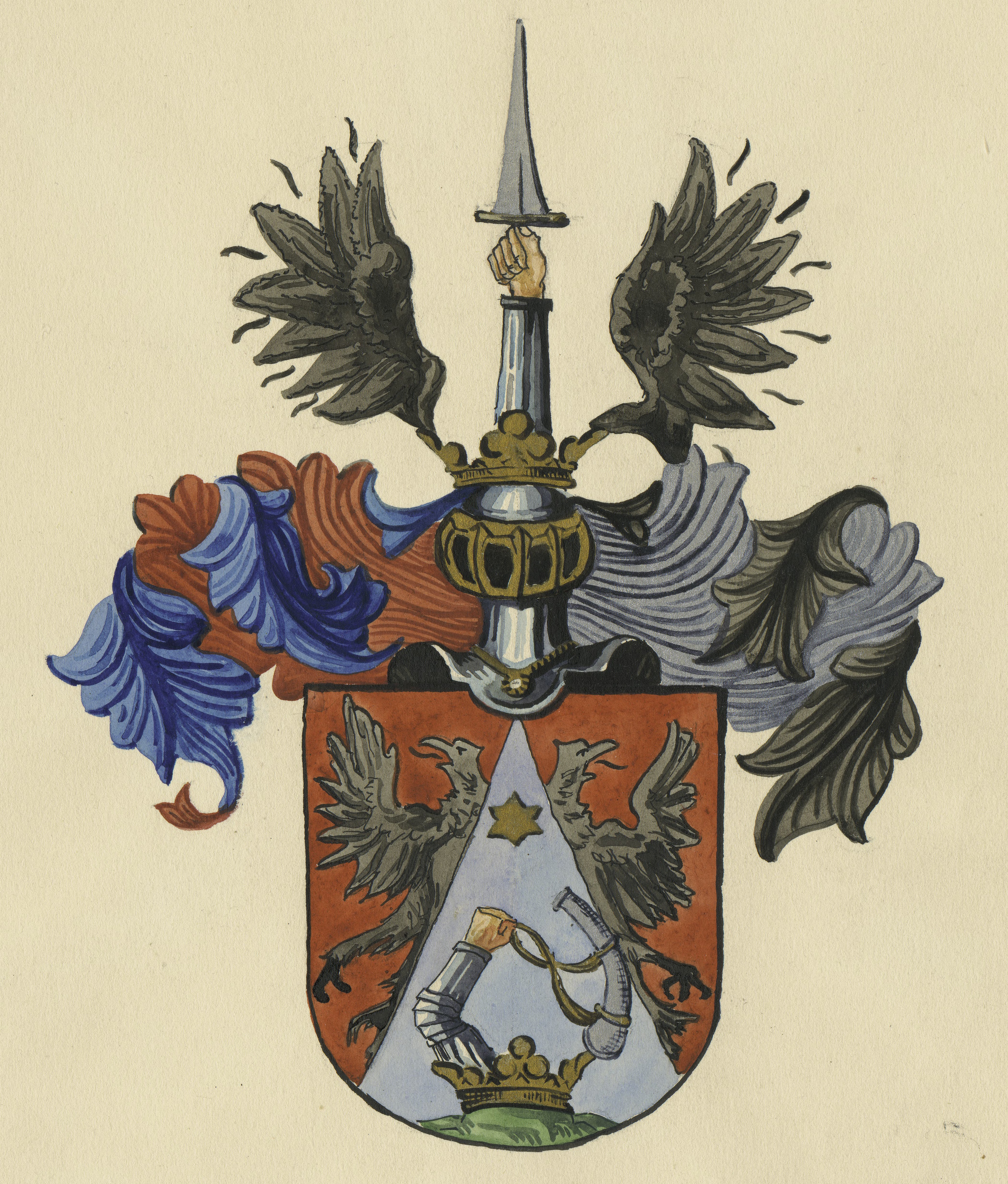
- Reign: 1451-1458
- Died: 1474
- Issue: Wenceslas, and Pongrác III
- Dynasty: House of Szent-miklós
- Father: Matthew I Szent-miklós

Pongrác the Second Szent-miklós (Exact date unknown – 1474) served as the archdeacon of Liptov and was one of Hungary's captains-in-chief. A supporter of John Hunyadi and King Matthias, he was also known as a robber baron, frequently changing allegiances for personal gain. He was also known by the nickname "King of Trenčín."

== Background ==
Pongrác Szent-miklós belonged to the mid-ranking noble family of Szent-miklós, occasionally referred to as Pongrác, which would later become known as the Pongrácz family. He was the eldest son of Matthew I, and some sources refer to him as Miklós II. At that time, surnames were not yet commonly used, and Pongrác was known by several names, including Liptóik, Berencsik, and Szakolcaik, which were based on his origins or estates. He had three brothers: Stephen I, James II, and John III.

Pongrác is first mentioned in 1415 CE when he accompanied King Sigismund to the Council of Constance. In 1434, Pongrác purchased the village of Blatnica for 2,300 gold pieces from Queen Cillei Borbála. His earliest independent charter dates from 1435, when he issued a document at Blatnica Castle in Turoč County, which his family had received from the king in 1403.

In 1437, the Ottoman Empire launched an attack on Szendrő, which was defended by the Serbian leader George Brankovics. In response to a request for reinforcements, King Sigismund sent three of his trusted subjects: John Jiskra, John Hunyadi, and Pongrác. Pongrác led the group, while Jiskra and Hunyadi commanded the Transylvanian Auxiliary. Together, they defeated the Ottoman forces and drove them away.

Also in 1437, Pongrác received Branc Castle from Svaty Mikuláš, which he used as a base to begin his career as a robber baron, engaging in robbery, extortion, and theft from surrounding settlements and estates.

In 1441, he sold the village of Blatnica to László Neczpáli, the castle captain of Szakolca, for 9,000 gold florins.

== As oligarch and robber baron ==
By the 1440s, Pongrác had begun exploiting the chaotic conditions stemming from weak central authority, using violence to amass wealth. There was little that King Władysław III could have done to stop him. In March 1443, due to his services to the crown, the king forgave Pongrác and his family for their "acts of harassment, robbery and arson." However, Pongrác did not change his ways. By November of the same year, he received another pardon, but this time with a warning that he risked permanently losing the king's favour.

In August 1444, Pongrác Szent-miklós, now a significant local power, signed a treaty of friendship with János Hunyadi, who had become one of the country's most important military leaders. When the Diet of Pest reorganized the local leaders into what came to be known as the council of Captains in Chief, Pongrác was appointed as a National Captain of Matyusland (the area between the Danube, Vág, and Morava rivers) alongside Mihály Ország. Despite this position, he continued his acts of violence against his neighbors.

On May 4, 1449, Pongrác formed a defensive alliance with John Jiskra, who was also seizing castles and towns in the Highlands. This alliance included a punitory fee of 10,000 florins for either side's failure to comply.

In 1450, John Hunyadi marched against Jiskra but could not defeat him and was compelled to negotiate peace. Pongrác also persistently raided and extorted Lower Austrian towns. In response, Emperor Frederick III sent Ulrik Cillei against him in 1450, who laid siege to Szakolca. However, after Hunyadi sided with Pongrác against the Emperor, Cillei withdrew.

By 1451, Pongrác declared himself the Archbishop of Lippe in a charter he issued.

In 1452, Hunyadi borrowed 7,000 florins from the Szent-miklós family to fund his war against the Turks, mortgaging Szakolca and a portion of the tax revenue from Zsolna. At the end of that year, Hunyadi was elected as a governor in the Kingdom of Hungary. In February of the following year, the Diet of Bratislava ordered the outlawing of Pongrác Szentmiklós, John Jiskra, and Péter Komorovszky, along with the confiscation of their property. This decision proved largely ineffective, as Pongrác remained the chief bailiff of Liptov due to his favorable relations with Hunyadi.

In September 1453, King László confirmed Pongrác's ownership of Berench, Ugroch, Wyvar, Likava, and Naghwar, and increased the pledge for Sztrecsény and Óvár from 9,000 florins to 18,000 florins. In addition to these estates, Pongrác constructed various fortifications (such as those at Nagybiccsé in Nitra), fortified his main estate Liptószentmiklós with walls, and used these as bases for further plundering and raiding. Hunyadi was compelled to enter into a pact with Pongrác, signed in May 1454. Under this agreement, Pongrác surrendered the castles of Berencs, Sztrecsény, and Zsolna for 4,000 florins. In return, he received Sido Castle, Mezősomyló, Maxond, Fruzsinkavár and Sasvár in Timis; Újvár, Nagyvár, and Likava with the associated chamber tax; the Liptov archbishopric; and the thirty-cent tax of Turdossin of Liptov, as well as the thirty-cent tax of Turdossin of Arava. His brothers, Stephen, James, and John, were also involved in this arrangement.

Despite the pact, Pongrác remained set in his destructive ways. A few months after his coronation, King Matthias stripped Pongrác of Nagyvár, Óvár and Likava, transferring them to Péter Komorovszky, who was later appointed chief bailiff of Liptov.

Pongrác of Szent-miklós died around 1474. Nonetheless, the Szent-miklós family did not entirely fall out of the king's favour. The family unsuccessfully sought restitution for their lost castles, but, in 1479, King Matthias pardoned Pongrác's three brothers and their sons for all past offenses and prohibited the courts from conducting trials regarding these cases.
