= John Hunyadi =

Hungarian military and political figure (c. 1406–1456)

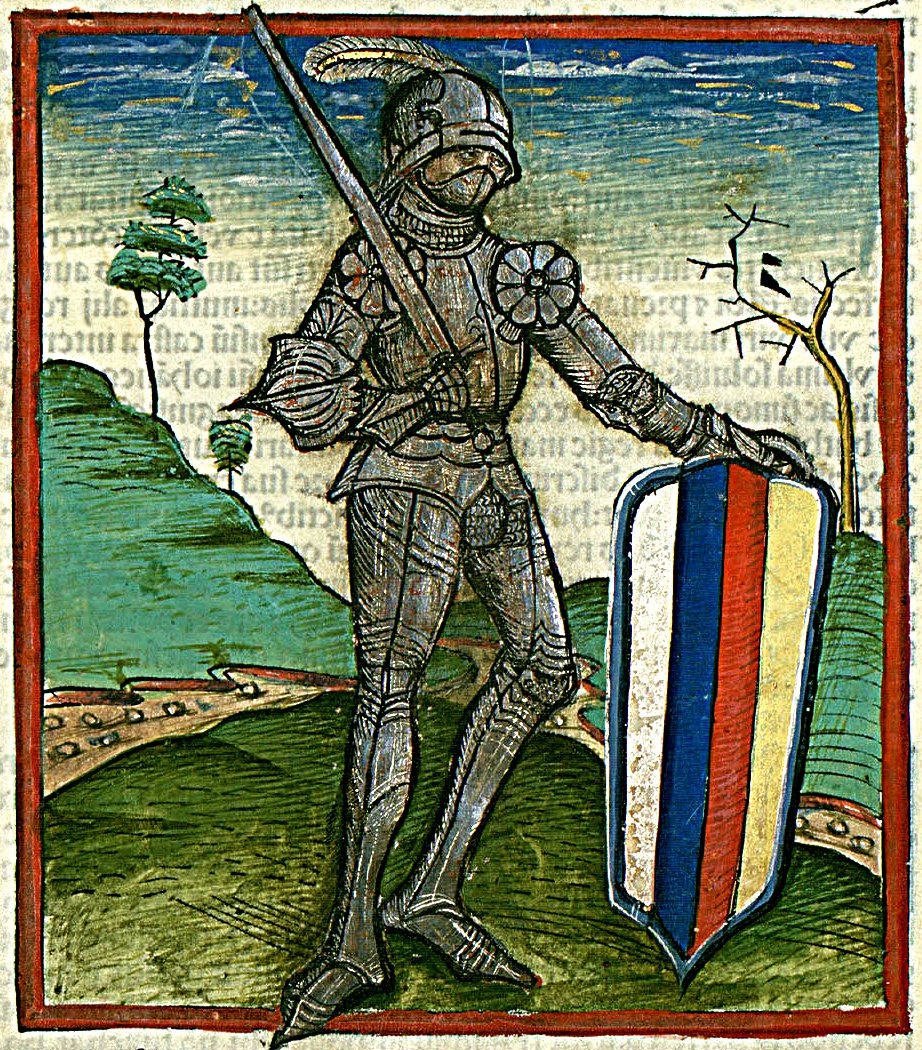
- John Hunyadi depicted in Chronica Hungarorum (1488)

Regent-Governor of the Kingdom of Hungary
- In office 6 June 1446 – 30 January 1453
- Monarch: Ladislaus V
- Preceded by: Elizabeth of Luxembourg (as regent)
- Succeeded by: Ulrich of Celje (as Captain in Chief)

Captain in Chief of the Kingdom of Hungary
- In office 30 January 1453 – 11 August 1456
- Monarch: Ladislaus V
- Succeeded by: Ulrich of Celje

Voivode of Transylvania, Count of the Székelys
- In office February 1441 – 6 June 1446 Serving with Nicholas of Ilok
- Preceded by: Michael Jakcs; Ladislaus Jakcs
- Succeeded by: Nicholas of Ilok

Personal details
- Born: c. 1406
- Died: 11 August 1456 (aged 49–50) Zimony, Kingdom of Hungary
- Resting place: St. Michael's Cathedral, Gyulafehérvár, Kingdom of Hungary (now Alba Iulia, Romania)
- Spouse: Erzsébet Szilágyi
- Children: Ladislaus Hunyadi; Matthias Corvinus
- Parents: Voyk (father); Erzsébet Morzsinai (mother)
- Relatives: Michael Szilágyi (brother-in-law)
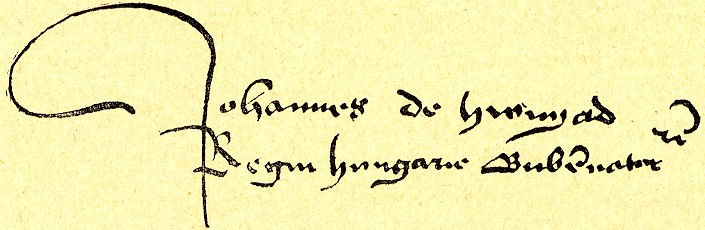
- Signature
- Nickname: Turk-buster

Military service
- Allegiance: Kingdom of Hungary
- Years of service: 1420–1456
- Rank: Commander-in-chief
- Battles/wars: Tree list: Hungarian-Wallachian Wars; Wallachian campaign of 1445; Wallachian campaign of 1446; Wallachian & Moldovan campaigns of 1447; Hungarian Civil War (1440–1442); Siege of Győr (1440); Battle of Szegszárd (1440); Battle of Cikádor (1441); Hungarian–Ottoman Wars; Hungarian–Ottoman War (1437–1442); Battle of Smederevo (1437); Siege of Szendrő (1439); Siege of Belgrade (1440); Battle of Smederevo (1441); Battle of the Iron Gate; Battle of the Ialomița (1442); Long Campaign; Battle of Nish (1443); Battle of Aleksinac (1443); Siege of Sofia (1443); Battle of Zlatitsa (1443); Battle of Melstica (1443); Battle of Kunovica (1444); Battle of Varna (1444); Lower-Sava campaign (1445); Lower Danube Campaign (1445); Battle of Kosovo (1448); Battle of Kruševac (1454); Siege of Belgrade (1456)

John Hunyadi (Hungarian: Hunyadi János; Romanian: Ioan de Hunedoara; Croatian: Janko Hunjadi; Serbian: Сибињанин Јанко, romanized: Sibinjanin Janko; Turkish: Hünyadi Yanoş; c. 1406 – 11 August 1456) was a leading Hungarian military and political figure during the 15th century, who served as regent of the Kingdom of Hungary from 1446 to 1453, under the minor Ladislaus V.

According to most contemporary sources, he was the member of a noble family of Wallachian ancestry. Through his struggles against the Ottoman Empire, he earned for himself the nickname "Turk-buster" from his contemporaries. Due to his merits, he quickly received substantial land grants. By the time of his death, he was the owner of immense land areas, totaling approximately four million cadastral acres, which had no precedent before or after in the Kingdom of Hungary. His enormous wealth and his military and political weight were primarily directed towards the purposes of the Ottoman wars.

Hunyadi mastered his military skills on the southern borderlands of the Kingdom of Hungary that were exposed to Ottoman attacks. Appointed Ban of Szörény in 1439, appointed Voivode of Transylvania, Counts of the Székelys, Ispán of Temes County and Captain of Nándorfehérvár (now Belgrade) in 1441, he assumed responsibility for the defense of the frontiers. John Hunyadi immediately advocated for an offensive, anti-Ottoman strategy. He began preparing for an offensive war aimed at gradually shifting military operations into Ottoman territory. His plans signalled a revival of the crusading ideal, as Ottoman expansion had become increasingly intolerable. As Hunyadi wrote to the Pope, his principal goal was, if possible with international assistance, to defeat the Ottomans in a decisive battle, continue the war on Ottoman territory until its final conclusion, and expel the Ottomans from Europe. Well-equipped heavy cavalry and the use of Hussite wagon fort played a crucial role in his victories. He employed professional soldiers, but also mobilized local peasantry against invaders. These innovations contributed to his earliest successes against the Ottoman troops who were plundering the southern marches in the early 1440s.

In 1442, Hunyadi won four victories against the Ottomans, two of which were decisive. In March 1442, Hunyadi defeated Mezid Bey and the raiding Ottoman army at the Battle of the Iron Gate in the south part of the Kingdom of Hungary in Transylvania. In September 1442 at the Battle of the Ialomița, Hunyadi defeated a large Ottoman army of Beylerbey Şehabeddin, the Provincial Governor of Rumelia. This was the first time a European army had defeated such a large Ottoman force, composed not only of raiders but also of provincial cavalry led by their own sanjak beys (governors) and accompanied by the elite, formidable janissaries. These victories brought Hunyadi international fame and undermined the growing belief in Ottoman invincibility, the name of Hunyadi became famous and generally respected in the Christian world and became feared by the entire Ottoman Empire. Hunyadi's victories were a primary motivation for the successful Hungarian anti-Ottoman crusade of the winter of 1443–1444, known as the Long Campaign. Although his crusades ended in defeat at the Battle of Varna in 1444 and at the Second Battle of Kosovo in 1448, Hunyadi established his reputation as a great general through his successful defence during the Siege of Belgrade in 1456 against an Ottoman army led personally by Sultan Mehmed the Conqueror. This victory boosted the morale of European Christian forces and halted Ottoman expansion towards Europe beyond the Balkans for 70 years. The pope ordered that European churches ring their bells at noon to gather the faithful in prayer for those who were fighting. The bells of Christian churches are rung at noon to commemorate the Belgrade victory.

John Hunyadi was also an eminent statesman. He actively took part in the civil war between the partisans of Vladislaus I and the minor Ladislaus V, two claimants to the throne of Hungary in the early 1440s, on behalf of the former. He was popular among the lesser nobility, and in 1445 the Diet of Hungary appointed him as Captains in Chief responsible for the administration of state affairs until Ladislaus V (by that time unanimously accepted as king) came of age. The next Diet went even further, electing Hunyadi as sole regent with the title of Governor. When he resigned from this office in 1452, the sovereign awarded him with the first hereditary title in the Kingdom of Hungary, (perpetual count of Beszterce). He had by this time become one of the wealthiest landowners in the kingdom, and preserved his influence in the Diet up until his death.

This Athleta Christi (Christ's Champion), as Pope Pius II referred to him, died some three weeks after his triumph at Belgrade, falling to an epidemic that had broken out in the crusader camp. However, his victories over the Turks prevented them from invading the Kingdom of Hungary for more than 60 years. His fame was a decisive factor in the election of his son, Matthias Corvinus, as king by the Diet of 1457. Hunyadi is a popular historical figure among Hungarians, Romanians, Serbs, Bulgarians, Croats, and other nations of the region.

== Childhood (c. 1406 – c. 1420) ==
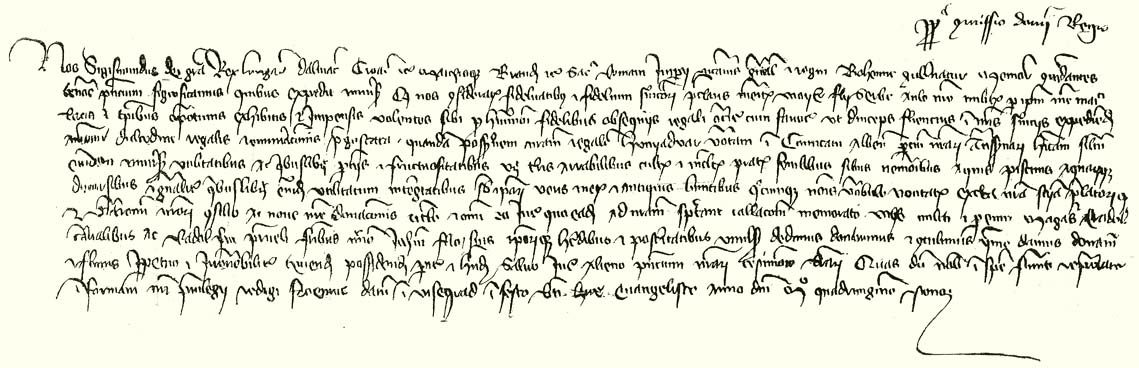
King Sigismund of Hungary's charter of the grant of Hunyad Castle (in present-day Hunedoara, Romania) to Voyk, Magas and Radol (the sons of Serbe), and their uncle or cousin, Radol, and Voyk's son, John

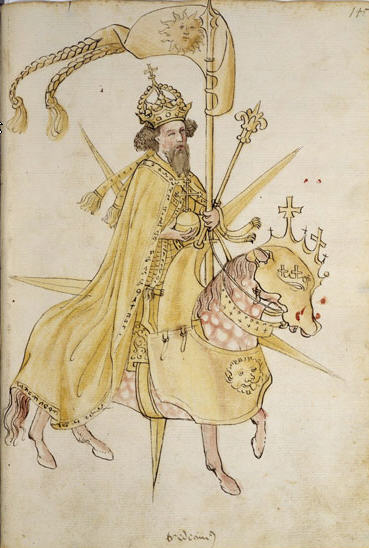
Sigismund, King of Hungary

A royal charter of grant issued on 18 October 1409 contains the first reference to John Hunyadi. In the document, King Sigismund of Hungary bestowed Hunyad Castle (in present-day Hunedoara, Romania) and the lands attached to it upon John's father, Voyk and Voyk's four kinsmen, including John himself. According to the document, John's father served in the royal household as a "court knight" at that time, suggesting that he was descended from a respected family. The royal charter of the transaction mentions Hunyadi as John the Vlach (Romanian). Two 15th-century chroniclers—Johannes de Thurocz and Antonio Bonfini—write that Voyk had moved from Wallachia to Hungary upon King Sigismund's initiative. László Makkai, Malcolm Hebron, Pál Engel and other scholars accept the two chroniclers' report of the Wallachian origin of John Hunyadi's father. In contrast with them, Ioan-Aurel Pop says that Voyk was a native of the wider region of Hunyad Castle. Holy Roman Emperor Frederick III likewise claimed that King Matthias Corvinus (the son of John Hunyadi and King of Hungary) had been "born to a Vlach father".

Hungarian researchers such as historian Dezső Dümmerth and turkologist László Rásonyi suggest that Voyk was of Cuman stock. According to the Chronica Hungarorum, Hunyadi descended from a prominent noble family from Wallachia, Hungarian historian Csaba Hidán argues that geographical origin does not necessarily determine ethnicity, and Wallachia, historically known as Ungrovalahia (Hungarian Wallachia) was a buffer zone within the sphere of influence of the Kingdom of Hungary and had some Hungarian population at the time. According to Hidán, the territory of early Wallachia, during the 11th–14th centuries, was characterised by a Cuman ruling elite. However, mainstream historiography notes that Cuman political hegemony north of the Danube collapsed following the 1241–1242 Mongol invasion, and the remaining Cuman elements assimilated into the majority Romanian population and local nobility (boyars), meaning a distinct Cuman ruling elite no longer existed in Wallachia by the 14th century.

Antonio Bonfini was the first chronicler to have made a passing remark of an alternative story of John Hunyadi's parentage, soon stating that it was just a "tasteless tale" fabricated by Hunyadi's opponent, Ulrich II, Count of Celje. According to this anecdote, John was actually not Voyk's child, but King Sigismund's illegitimate son. The story became especially popular during the reign of John Hunyadi's son, Matthias Corvinus who erected a statue for King Sigismund in Buda. The 16th-century chronicler Gáspár Heltai repeated and further developed the tale, but modern scholars—for instance, Cartledge, and Kubinyi—regard it as an unverifiable gossip. Hunyadi's popularity among the peoples of the Balkan Peninsula give rise to further legends of his royal parentage.

The identification of John Hunyadi's mother is even less certain. In connection with King Sigismund's supposed parentage, both Bonfini and Heltai say that she was the daughter of a rich boyar, or nobleman, whose estates were located at Morzsina (present-day Margina, Romania). Pop proposes that she was called Elisabeth. According to historian László Makkai, John Hunyadi's mother was a member of the Muzsina (or Mușina) kenez family from Demsus (Densuș, Romania), but Pop refuses the identification of the Morzsina and Muzsina families.

With regard of John Hunyadi's mother, Bonfini provides an alternative solution as well, stating that she was a distinguished Greek lady, but does not name her. According to Kubinyi, her alleged Greek origin may simply refer to her Orthodox faith. In a letter of 1489, Matthias Corvinus wrote that his grandmother's sister, whom the Ottoman Turks had captured and forced to join the harem of an unnamed Sultan, became the ancestor of Cem, the rebellious son of Sultan Mehmed II. Based on this letter, historian Kubinyi says that the "Greek connection cannot be discounted entirely". If Matthias Corvinus' report is valid, John Hunyadi—the hero of anti-Ottoman wars—and the Ottoman Sultan Mehmed II were first cousins. On the other hand, historian Péter E. Kovács writes that Matthias Corvinus' story about his family connection with the Ottoman Sultans was nothing but a pack of lies.

Hunyadi's year of birth is uncertain. Although Gáspár Heltai writes that Hunyadi was born in 1390, he must have actually been born between around 1405 and 1407, because his younger brother was only born after 1409, and a difference of almost two decades between the two brothers' age is not plausible. The place of his birth is likewise unknown. The 16th-century scholar, Antun Vrančić wrote that John Hunyadi had been "a native" of the Hátszeg region (now Țara Hațegului in Romania). Another theory places Hunyadi's birthplace in the village of Corbii de Piatră (today Corbi, Argeș County). The theory starts from the genealogy of Nicolaus Olahus (the nephew of John Hunyadi), which lists the estates of Marina Hunyadi, John Hunyadi's sister. One of her listed estates was Corbii de Piatră ("in Transalpina castrum Walachika lingua Corvi de Piatra"), which she received from her brother as dowry for her wedding to a Wallachian boyar. The estate was also mentioned before in a charter from April 1456 issued by Vladislav II of Wallachia as belonging to a certain Jupan Mogos, possibly the same person as Magas, Voyk's brother, who was mentioned in the donation of Hunyad Castle. This origin of Hunyadi is consistent with the statements of the 15th-century humanist writers Pietro Ranzano and Antonio Bonfini, who attested that John Hunyadi was born in the "ancestral village [in Corvino vico], which is also called Corvinum in our time". The origin of the Hunyadi family in the village of Corbii de Piatră (lit. 'Stone Ravens') may also explain the raven featured on John Hunyadi's coat of arms.

Hunyadi's father died before 12 February 1419. A royal charter issued on this day mentions Hunyadi, Hunyadi's two brothers (John the younger and Voyk) and their uncle Radol, but does not refer to their father.

== Rise of a general ==
=== Youth (c. 1420–1438) ===
Andreas Pannonius, who served Hunyadi for five years, wrote that the future commander "accustomed himself to tolerate both cold and heat in good time". Like other young noblemen, John Hunyadi spent his youth serving in the court of powerful magnates. However, the exact list of his employers cannot be completed, because 15th-century authors recorded contradictory data on his early life.

Filippo Scolari's biographer, Poggio Bracciolini writes that Scolari—who was responsible for the defense of the southern frontier as Ispán, or head, of Temes County—educated Hunyadi from his very youth, suggesting that Hunyadi was Scolari's page around 1420. On the other hand, John of Capistrano writes, in a letter of 1456, that Hunyadi started his military career serving under Nicholas of Ilok. For Nicholas of Ilok was at least six year younger than Hunyadi, historian Pál Engel writes that Capistrano confused him with his brother, Stephen of Ilok. Finally, Antonio Bonfini says that at the beginning of his career Hunyadi worked either for Demeter Csupor, Bishop of Zagreb or for the Csákys.

According to the Byzantine historian Laonikos Chalkokondyles, the young Hunyadi "stayed for a time" at the court of Stefan Lazarević, Despot of Serbia, who died in 1427. Hunyadi's marriage with Elisabeth Szilágyi substantiates Chalkokondyles' report, because her father, Ladislaus was the Despot's familiaris around 1426. The wedding took place around 1429. While still a young man, Hunyadi entered the retinue of King Sigismund. He accompanied Sigismund to Italy in 1431 and upon Sigismund's order he joined the army of Filippo Maria Visconti, Duke of Milan. Bonfini says that Hunyadi "served two years" in the Duke's army. Modern scholars—for instance, Cartledge, Engel, Mureșanu and Teke—say that Hunyadi familiarized himself with the principles of contemporary military art, including the employment of mercenaries, in Milan.

Hunyadi again joined the entourage of Sigismund, who had in the meantime been crowned Holy Roman Emperor in Rome, at the very end of 1433. He served the monarch as a "court knight". He loaned 1,200 gold florins to the Emperor in January 1434. In exchange, Sigismund mortgaged Papi—a market town in Csanád County—and half of the royal incomes from a nearby ferry on the Maros River to Hunyadi and his younger brother. In short, Sigismund granted Hunyadi further domains, including Békésszentandrás, and Hódmezővásárhely, each incorporating about 10 villages.

Antonio Bonfini writes of Hunyadi's service in the retinue of one "Francis Csanádi" who "became so fond of him that treated him as if he were his own son". Historian Engel identifies Francis Csanádi with Franko Talovac, Croatian nobleman and Ban of Severin, who was also Ispán of Csanád County around 1432. Engel says that Hunyadi served in the Ban's retinue for at least one and a half years from around October 1434. A Vlach district of the Banate of Severin was mortgaged to Hunyadi in this period.

Sigismund, who entered Prague in the summer of 1436, hired Hunyadi and his 50 lancers for three months in October 1437 for 1,250 gold florins, implying that Hunyadi had accompanied him to Bohemia. Hunyadi seems to have studied the Hussites' tactics on this occasion, because he later applied its featuring elements, including the use of wagons as a mobile fortress. On 9 December 1437 Sigismund died; his son-in-law, Albert was elected King of Hungary in nine days. According to historians Teke and Engel, Hunyadi soon returned to the southern frontiers of the kingdom which had been subject to Ottoman raids. In contrast with them, Mureșanu says that Hunyadi served King Albert in Bohemia for at least a year, until the end of 1438.

=== First battles with the Ottomans (1438–1442) ===
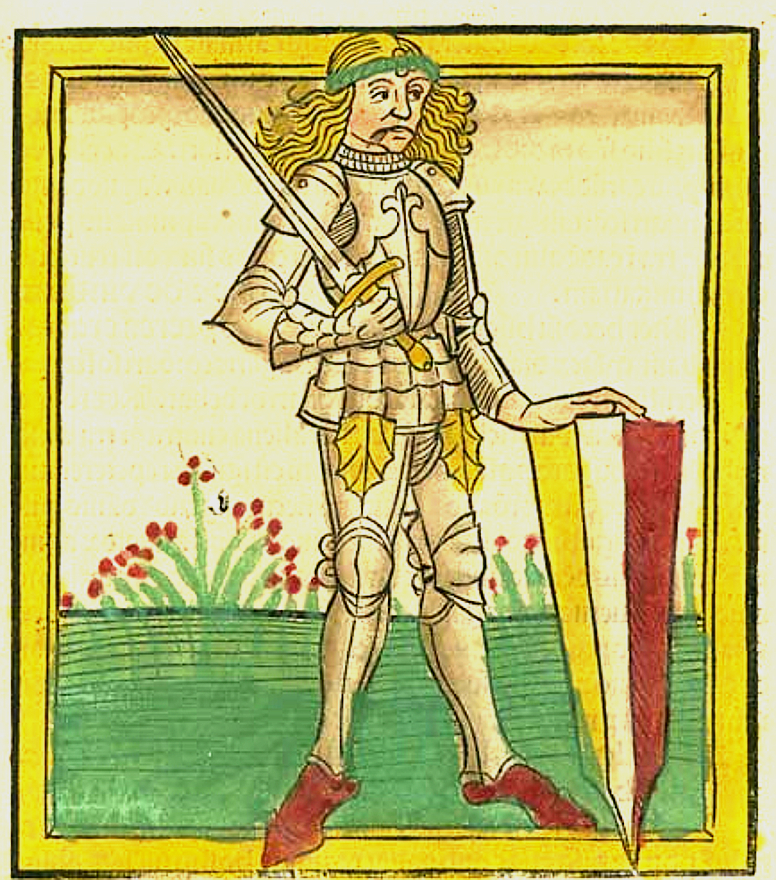
John Hunyadi (John Thuróczy – Chronica Hungarorum, 1488)

Anti-Ottoman campaigns of John Hunyadi, 1440–1456

The Ottomans had occupied the larger part of Serbia by the end of 1438. In the same year, Ottoman troops—supported by Vlad II Dracul, Prince of Wallachia—made an incursion into Transylvania, plundering Hermannstadt/Nagyszeben, Gyulafehérvár (present-day Alba Iulia, Romania) and other towns. After the Ottomans laid siege to Smederevo, the last important Serbian stronghold in June 1439, Đurađ Branković, Despot of Serbia fled to Hungary to seek military assistance.

King Albert proclaimed the general insurrection of the nobility against the Ottomans, but few armed noblemen assembled in the region of Titel and were ready to fight. A notable exception was Hunyadi, who made raids against the besiegers and defeated them in smaller skirmishes, which contributed to the rise of his fame. The Ottomans captured Smederevo in August. King Albert appointed the Hunyadi brothers Bans of Severin, elevating them to the rank of "true barons of the realm". He also mortgaged a Vlach district in Temes County to them.

King Albert died of dysentery on 27 October 1439. His widow, Elisabeth—Emperor Sigismund's daughter—gave birth to a posthumus son, Ladislaus. The Estates of the realm offered the crown to Vladislaus, King of Poland, but Elizabeth had his infant son crowned king on 15 May 1440. However, Vladislaus accepted the Estates' offer and was also crowned king on 17 July. During the ensuing civil war between the two kings' partisans, Hunyadi supported Vladislaus. Hunyadi fought against the Ottomans in Wallachia, for which King Vladislaus granted him five domains in the vicinity of his family estates on 9 August 1440.

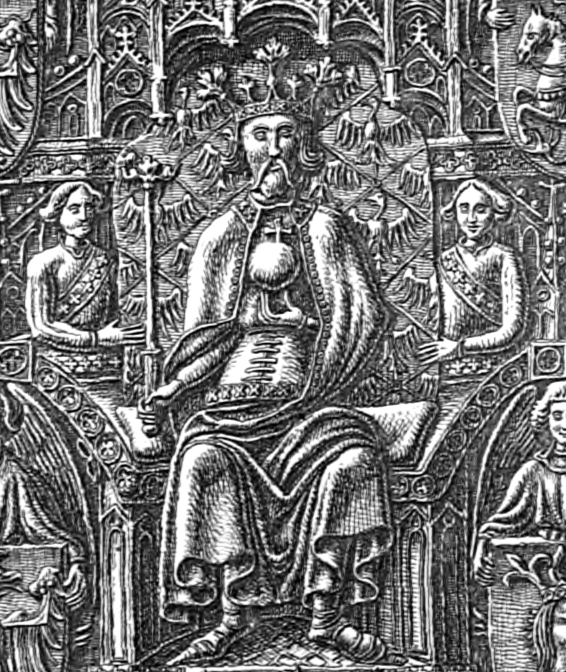
Detail of the seal of Vladislaus, King of Poland and Hungary, whom Hunyadi supported in the Hungarian civil war of 1440–1442

Hunyadi, together with Nicholas of Ilok, annihilated the troops of Vladislaus' opponents at Bátaszék at the very beginning of 1441. Their victory effectively put an end to the civil war. The grateful King appointed Hunyadi and his comrade joint Voivodes of Transylvania and Counts of the Székelys in February. In short, the King also nominated them Ispáns of Temes County and conferred upon them the command of Belgrade and all other castles along the Danube.

Since Nicholas of Ilok spent most of his time in the royal court, in practice Hunyadi administered Transylvania and the southern borderlands alone. Soon after his appointment, Hunyadi visited Transylvania where the child Ladislaus V's partisans had maintained a strong position. After Hunyadi pacified Transylvania, the regions under his administration remained undisturbed by internal conflicts, enabling Hunyadi to concentrate on the defence of the borders. By effectively defending the interests of local landowners at the royal court, Hunyadi strengthened his position in the provinces under his administration. For instance, he obtained land grants and privileges for local noblemen from the King.

Hunyadi set about repairing the walls of Belgrade, which had been damaged during an Ottoman attack. In retaliation for Ottoman raids in the region of the river Sava, he made an incursion into Ottoman territory in the summer or autumn of 1441. He scored a pitched battle victory over Ishak Bey, the commander of Smederovo.

John Hunyadi immediately advocated for an offensive, anti-Ottoman strategy after taking control of the southern frontiers. He began preparing for an offensive war aimed at gradually shifting military operations into Ottoman territory. As Hunyadi wrote to the Pope before the Battle of Kosovo in 1448, his principal goal was, if possible with international assistance, to defeat the Ottomans in a decisive battle, continue the war on Ottoman territory until its final conclusion, and expel the Ottomans from Europe. This marked a decisive shift away from the essentially defensive strategy adopted by King Sigismund after 1397 and signalled a revival of the crusading ideal, as political conditions in Europe had become more favourable, developments within the Church encouraged renewed crusading efforts, and Ottoman pressure had become increasingly intolerable.

They are exceedingly strong both in material resources and in numbers, and it is with them that we must measure our arms, and I fear that the war we have begun against the Turks will have to be waged against the whole of Asia... We shall bring it to an end only if we remain at the heels of the defeated enemy, and if we do not relent until the expulsion of the enemy from Europe has fulfilled our hopes... At present, Your Blessedness commands an army that can match them in pay, and commands soldiers who burn with the desire to avenge the grief inflicted upon their homes, who stand not in temporary, but in permanent arms against our eternal enemies, who will never be reconciled with the Christian name. Let only support not be withheld, so that, having achieved our goal, a liberated Europe, its faith restored, may proclaim the glory and splendor of the Holy See.

— A letter issued by John Vitéz, in the name of John Hunyadi, Governor of Hungary, to Pope Nicholas V (17 September 1448)

Early the next year, Bey Mezid invaded Transylvania with a force of 17,000 soldiers. Hunyadi was taken by surprise and lost the first battle near Marosszentimre (Sântimbru, Romania). Bey Mezid lay siege to Hermannstadt, but the united forces of Hunyadi and Újlaki, who had in the meantime arrived in Transylvania, forced the Ottomans to lift the siege. The Ottoman forces were annihilated at Battle of the Iron Gate on 22 March.

Pope Eugenius IV, who had been an enthusiastic propagator of a new crusade against the Ottomans, sent his legate, Cardinal Giuliano Cesarini to Hungary. The Cardinal arrived in May 1442 tasked with mediating a peace treaty between King Vladislaus and Dowager Queen Elisabeth. The Ottoman Sultan, Murad II dispatched Şihabeddin Pasha—the governor of Rumelia—to invade Transylvania with a force of 70,000. The Pasha stated that the mere sight of his turban would force his enemies to run far away. The Battle of the Ialomița was fought in early September 1442 between the army of the Kingdom of Hungary and the Ottoman Empire. The Hungarian army, led by John Hunyadi, defeated the forces of Şehabeddin Pasha, the Provincial Governor of Rumelia, in the upper valley of the Ialomița River.

Hunyadi placed Basarab II on the princely throne of Wallachia, but Basarab's opponent Vlad Dracul returned and forced Basarab to flee in early 1443.

Hunyadi's victories in 1441 and 1442 made him a prominent enemy of the Ottomans and renowned throughout Christendom. He established a vigorous offensive posture in his battles, which enabled him to counteract the numerical superiority of the Ottomans through decisive maneuver. He employed mercenaries (many of them recently disbanded Czech Hussite troops), increasing the professionalism in his ranks and supplementing the numerous irregulars mustered from local peasantry, whom he had no reservations about employing in the field.

== General and politician ==
=== The Long Campaign (1443–1444) ===
In April 1443 King Vladislaus and his barons decided to mount a major campaign against the Ottoman Empire. With the mediation of Cardinal Cesarini, Vladislaus reached a truce with Frederick III of Germany, who had been the guardian of the child Ladislaus V. The armistice guaranteed that Frederick III would not attack Hungary in the subsequent twelve months.

Spending around 32,000 gold florins from his own treasury, Hunyadi hired more than 10,000 mercenaries. The King also mustered troops, and reinforcements arrived from Poland and Moldavia. The King and Hunyadi departed for the campaign at the head of an army of 25–27,000 men in the autumn of 1443. In theory, Vladislaus commanded the army, but the true leader of the campaign was Hunyadi. Despot Đurađ Branković joined them with a force of 8,000 men.

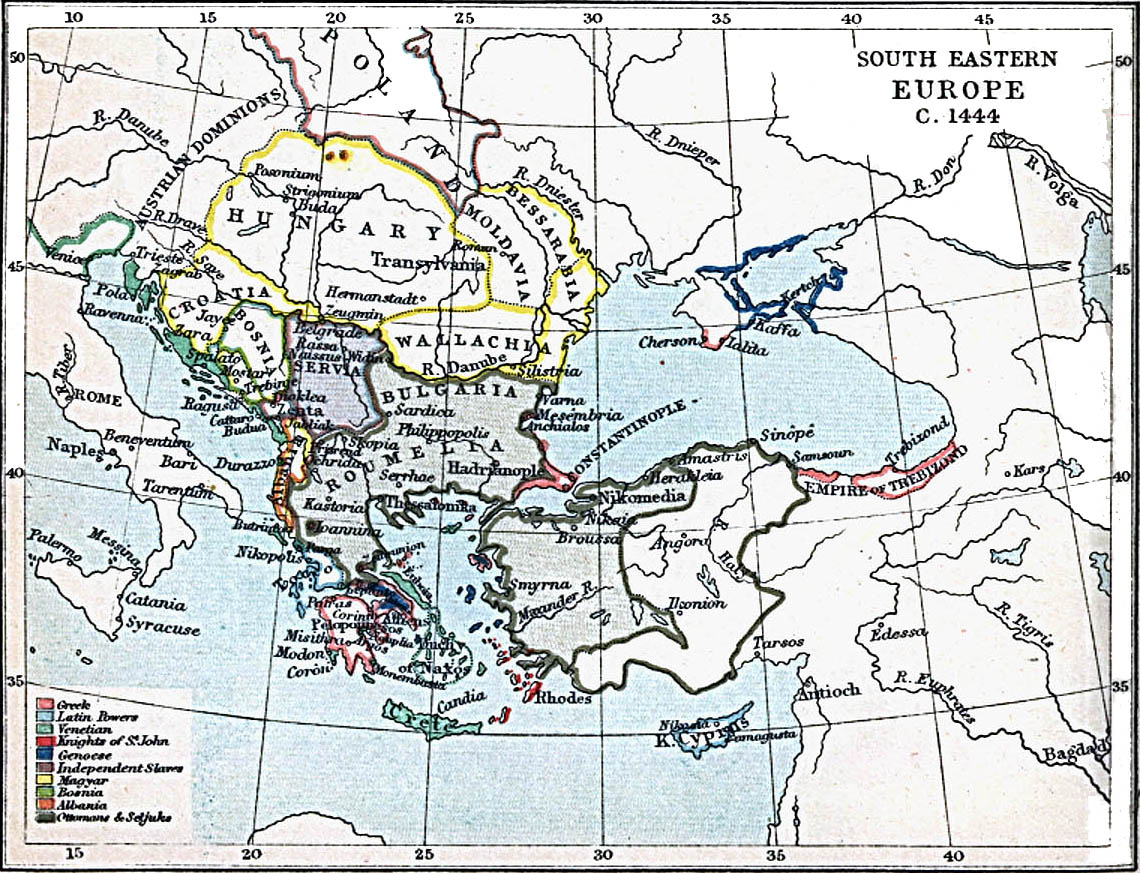
Map of Southeastern Europe, circa 1444

Hunyadi commanded the vanguards and routed four smaller Ottoman forces, hindering their unification. He captured Kruševac, Niš and Sofia. However, the Hungarian troops could not break through the passes of the Balkan Mountains towards Edirne. Cold weather and the lack of supplies forced the Christian troops to stop the campaign at Zlatitsa. After being victorious in the Battle of Kunovica, they returned to Belgrade in January and Buda in February 1444.

=== Battle of Varna and its aftermath (1444–1446) ===
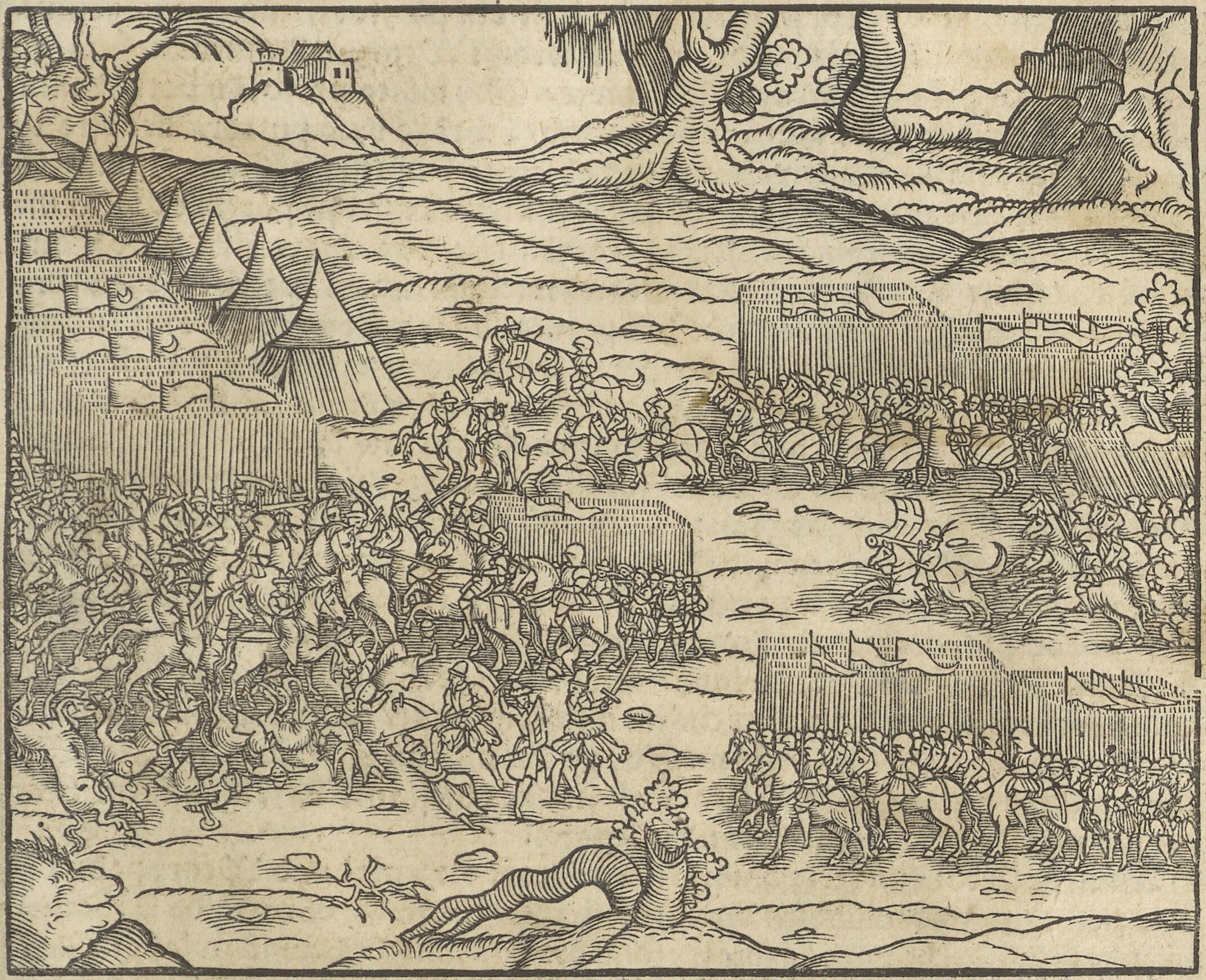
The Battle of Varna, as depicted in the 1564 edition of Martin Bielski's Polish Chronicle

Although no major Ottoman forces had been defeated, Hunyadi's "long campaign" stirred enthusiasm throughout Christian Europe. Pope Eugenius, Philip the Good, Duke of Burgundy and other European powers demanded a new crusade, promising financial or military support. The formation of a "party"—a group of noblemen and clerics—under Hunyadi's leadership can be dated to this period. Their main purpose was the defence of Hungary against the Ottomans. According to a letter of Đurađ Branković, Hunyadi spent more than 63,000 gold florins to hire mercenaries in the first half of the year. An eminent representative of Renaissance humanism in Hungary, John Vitéz became Hunyadi's close friend around that time.

The advance of Christian forces in Ottoman territory also encouraged the peoples of the Balkan Peninsula to revolt in the peripheries of the Ottoman Empire. For instance, Skanderbeg, an Albanian noble, expelled the Ottomans from Krujë and all other fortresses once held by his family. Sultan Murad II, whose main concern was a rebellion by the Karamanids in Anatolia, offered generous terms of peace to King Vladislaus. He even promised to withdraw the Ottoman garrisons from Serbia, thus restoring its semi-autonomous status under Despot Đurađ Branković. He also offered a truce for ten years. The Hungarian envoys accepted the Sultan's offer in Edirne on 12 June 1444.

Đurađ Branković, who was grateful for the restoration of his realm, donated his estates at Világos (present-day Șiria, Romania) in Zaránd County to Hunyadi on 3 July. Hunyadi proposed King Vladislaus to confirm the advantageous treaty, but Cardinal Cesarini urged the monarch to continue the crusade. On 4 August Vladislaus took a solemn oath of launching a campaign against the Ottoman Empire before the end of the year even if a peace treaty were concluded. According to Johannes de Thurocz, the King appointed Hunyadi to sign the peace treaty on 15 August. In a week, Đurađ Branković mortgaged his extensive domains in the Kingdom of Hungary—including Debrecen, Munkács (present-day Mukacheve, Ukraine), and Nagybánya (present-day Baia Mare, Romania)—to Hunyadi.

King Vladislaus, whom Cardinal Cesarini urged to keep his oath, decided to invade the Ottoman Empire in autumn. Upon the Cardinal's proposal, he offered Hunyadi the crown of Bulgaria. The crusaders departed from Hungary on 22 September. They planned to advance towards the Black Sea across the Balkan Mountains. They expected that the Venetian fleet would hinder Sultan Murad from transferring Ottoman forces from Anatolia to the Balkans, but the Genoese transported the Sultan's army across the Dardanelles. The two armies clashed near Varna on 10 November.

Although outnumbered by two to one, the crusaders initially ruled the battlefield against the Ottomans. However, the young King Vladislaus launched a premature attack against the janissaries and was killed. Taking advantage of the crusaders' panic, the Ottomans annihilated their army. Hunyadi narrowly escaped from the battlefield, but was captured and imprisoned by Wallachian soldiers. However, Vlad Dracul set him free before long.

At the next Diet of Hungary, which assembled in April 1445, the Estates decided that they would unanimously acknowledge the child Ladislaus V's rule if King Vladislaus, whose fate was still uncertain, had not arrived in Hungary by the end of May. The Estates also elected seven "Captains in Chief", including Hunyadi, each being responsible for the restoration of internal order in the territory allotted to them. Hunyadi was assigned to administer the lands east of the river Tisza. Here he possessed at least six castles and owned lands in about ten counties, which made him the most powerful baron in the region under his rule.

Hunyadi was planning to organize a new crusade against the Ottoman Empire. For this purpose, he barraged the Pope and other Western monarchs with letters in 1445. In September he had a meeting, at Nicopolis, with Waleran de Wavrin (nephew of the chronicler Jean de Wavrin), the captain of eight Burgundian galleys, and Vlad Dracul of Wallachia, who had seized small fortresses along the Lower Danube from the Ottomans. However, he did not risk a clash with the Ottoman garrisons stationed on the south bank of the river, and returned to Hungary before winter. Vlad Dracul soon concluded a peace treaty with the Ottomans.

=== Governorship (1446–1453) ===
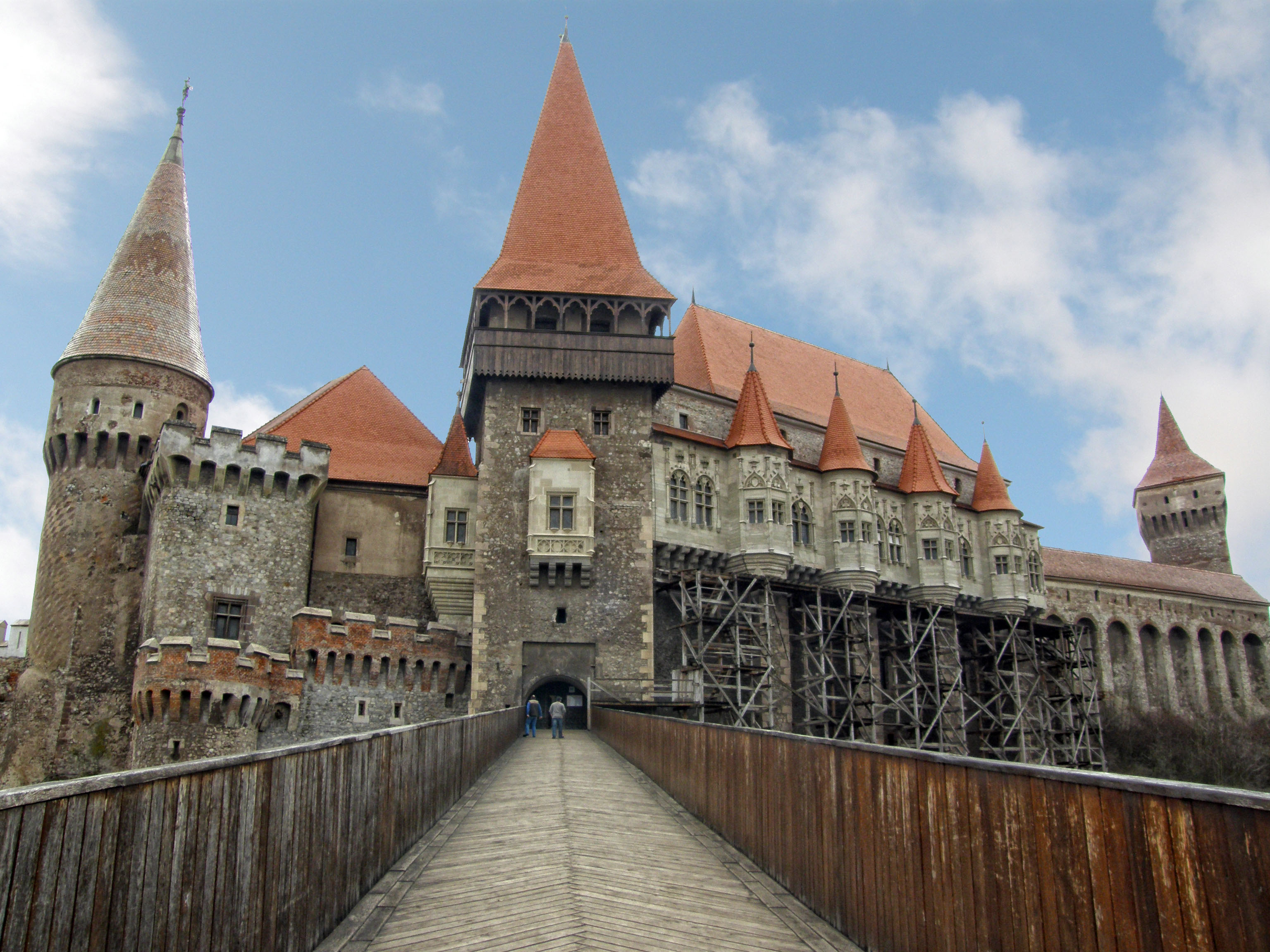
Main entrance of the Hunyad Castle (in present-day Hunedoara, Romania)

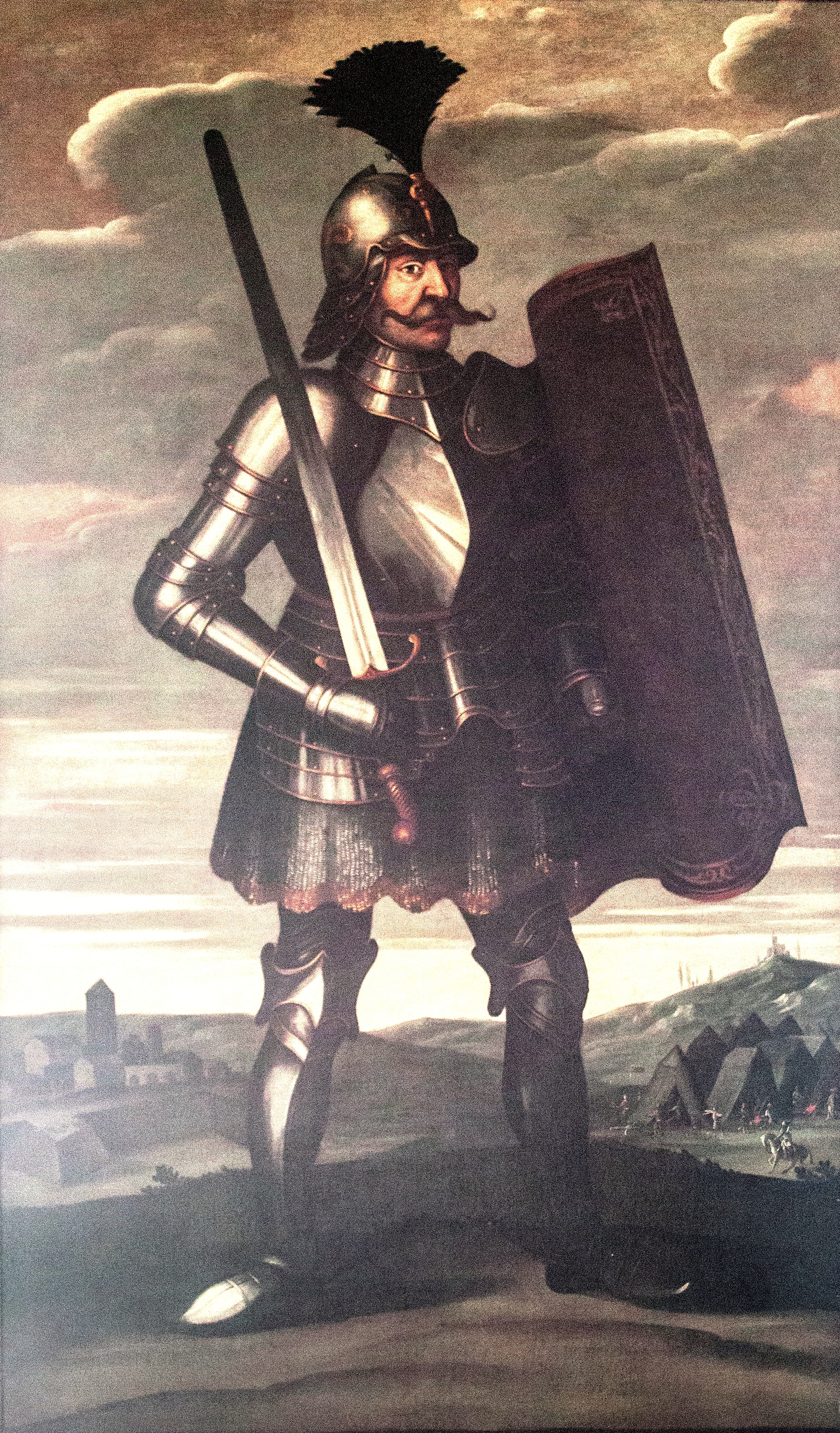
John Hunyadi

The Estates of the realm proclaimed Hunyadi regent, bestowing the title "governor" upon him on 6 June 1446. His election was primarily promoted by the lesser nobility, but Hunyadi had by that time become one of the richest barons of the kingdom. His domains covered an area exceeding 800,000 hectares (2,000,000 acres). Hunyadi was one of the few contemporaneous barons who spent a significant part of their revenues to finance the wars against the Ottomans, thus bearing a large share of the cost of fighting for many years.

As governor, Hunyadi was authorized to exercise most royal prerogatives for the period of King Ladislaus V's minority. For instance, he could make land grants, but only up to the size of 32 peasant holdings. Hunyadi attempted to pacify the border regions. Soon after his election, he launched an unsuccessful campaign against Ulrich II, Count of Celje. Count Ulrich administered Slavonia with the title ban (which he had arbitrarily adopted) and refused to renounce of it in favor of Hunyadi's appointee. Hunyadi could not force him to submit.

Hunyadi persuaded John Jiskra of Brandýs—a Czech commander who controlled the northern regions (in present-day Slovakia)—to sign an armistice for three years on 13 September. However, Jiskra did not keep the truce, and armed conflicts continued. In November Hunyadi proceeded against Frederick III of Germany, who had refused to release Ladislaus V and seized Kőszeg, Sopron and other towns along the western border. Hunyadi's troops plundered Austria, Styria, Carinthia and Carniola, but no decisive battle was fought. A truce with Frederick III was signed on 1 June 1447. Although Frederick renounced of Győr, his position as the minor King's guardian was confirmed. The Estates of the realm were disappointed and the Diet elected Ladislaus Garai—a leader of Hunyadi's opponents—Palatine in September 1447.

Hunyadi accelerated his negotiations, which had been commenced in the previous year, with Alfonso the Magnanimous, King of Aragon and Naples. He even offered the crown to Alfonso in exchange for the King's participation in an anti-Ottoman crusade and the confirmation of his position as governor. However, King Alfonso refrained from signing an agreement.

Hunyadi invaded Wallachia and dethroned Vlad Dracul in December 1447. According to the contemporaneous Polish chronicler Jan Długosz, Hunyadi had "the very man he promised to make voivode" blinded, and planned "to appropriate" Wallachia for himself. Hunyadi styled himself "voivode of the Transalpine land" and referred to the Wallachian town, Târgoviște as "our fortress" in a letter of 4 December. It is without doubt that Hunyadi installed a new voivode in Wallachia, but modern historians debate whether the new voivode was Vladislav II (to whom Hunyadi referred as his relative in a letter) or Dan (who seems to have been a son of Basarab II). In February 1448 Hunyadi sent an army to Moldavia to support the pretender Peter in seizing the throne. In exchange, Peter acknowledged Hunyadi's suzerainty and contributed to the installation of a Hungarian garrison in the fort of Chilia Veche on the Lower Danube.

Hunyadi made a new attempt to expel Count Ulrich of Celje from Slavonia, but could not defeat him. In June Hunyadi and the Count reached an agreement, which confirmed Count Ulrich's position of Ban in Slavonia. In short time Hunyadi sent his envoys to the two most prominent Albanian leaders—Scanderbeg and his father-in-law, Gjergj Arianiti—to seek their assistance against the Ottomans. Pope Eugenius suggested that the anti-Ottoman campaign should be postponed. However, Hunyadi stated, in a letter dated 8 September 1448, that he "have had enough of our men enslaved, our women raped, wagons loaded with the severed heads of our people" and expressed his determination to expel "the enemy from Europe". In the same letter, he explained his military strategy to the Pope, stating that "[p]ower is always greater when used in attack rather than in defence".

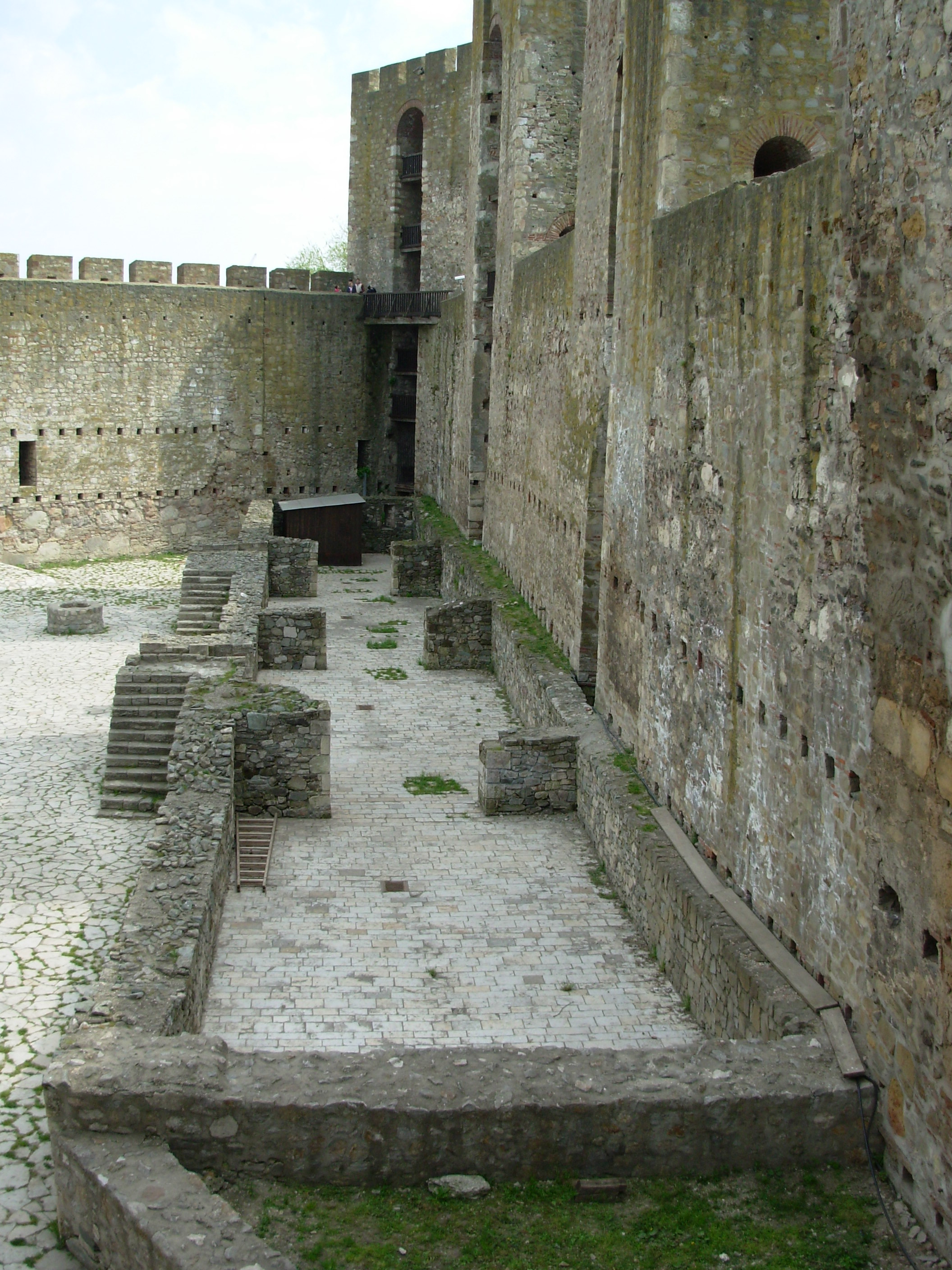
Ruins of Despot Đurađ Branković's palace in the Smederevo Fortress—Hunyadi was kept prisoner in this fort after his defeat in the Second Battle of Kosovo in 1448

Hunyadi departed for the new campaign at the head of an army of 16,000 soldiers in September 1448. About 8,000 soldiers from Wallachia also joined his campaign. For Đurađ Branković refused to assist the crusaders, Hunyadi treated him as the Ottoman's ally and his army marched through Serbia plundering the countryside. In order to prevent the unification of the armies of Hunyadi and Skanderbeg, Sultan Murad II joined battle with Hunyadi on Kosovo Polje on 17 October. The battle, which lasted for three days, ended with the crusaders' catastrophic defeat. Around 17,000 Hungarian and Wallachian soldiers were killed or captured and Hunyadi could hardly escape from the battlefield. On his way home, Hunyadi was captured by Đurađ Branković who kept him prisoner in the fort of Smederevo. The Despot was initially contemplating to surrender Hunyadi to the Ottomans. However, the Hungarian barons and prelates who assembled at Szeged persuaded him to make peace with Hunyadi. According to the treaty, Hunyadi was obliged to pay a ransom of 100,000 gold florins and to return all the domains that he had acquired from Đurađ Branković. Hunyadi's oldest son, Ladislaus was sent to the Despot as a hostage. Hunyadi was released, and he returned to Hungary in late December 1448.

His defeat and his humiliating treaty with the Despot weakened Hunyadi's position. The prelates and the barons confirmed the treaty and assigned Branković to negotiate with the Ottomans, and Hunyadi resigned from the office of Voivode of Transylvania. He invaded the lands controlled by John Jiskra and his Czech mercenaries in the autumn of 1449, but could not defeat them. On the other hand, the rulers of two neighboring countries—Stjepan Tomaš, King of Bosnia, and Bogdan II, Voivode of Moldavia—concluded a treaty with Hunyadi, promising that they would remain loyal to him. In early 1450 Hunyadi and Jiskra signed a peace treaty in Mezőkövesd, acknowledging that many prosperous towns in Upper Hungary—including Pressburg/Pozsony (present-day Bratislava, Slovakia) and Kassa (present-day Košice, Slovakia)—remained under Jiskra's rule.

Upon Hunyadi's demand, the Diet of March 1450 ordered the confiscation of Branković's estates in the Kingdom of Hungary. Hunyadi and his troops departed for Serbia, forcing Branković to release his son. Hunyadi, Ladislaus Garai and Nicholas Újlaki concluded a treaty on 17 July 1450, promising each other assistance to preserve their offices in case King Ladislaus V returned to Hungary. In October Hunyadi made peace with Frederick III of Germany, which confirmed the German monarch's position as guardian of Ladislaus V for further eight years. With the mediation of Újlaki and other barons, Hunyadi also concluded a peace treaty with Branković in August 1451, which authorized Hunyadi to redeem the debated domains for 155,000 gold florins. Hunyadi launched a military expedition against Jiskra, but the Czech commander routed the Hungarian troops near Losonc (present-day Lučenec, Slovakia) on 7 September. With the mediation of Branković, Hungary and the Ottoman Empire signed a three-year truce on 20 November.

The Austrian noblemen rose up in open rebellion against Frederick III of Germany, who governed the duchy in the name of Ladislaus the Posthumus at the turn of 1451 and 1452. The leader of the rebellion, Ulrich Eizinger sought the assistance of the Estates of Ladislaus's two other realms, Bohemia and Hungary. The Diet of Hungary, which assembled in Pressburg/Pozsony in February 1452, sent a delegation to Vienna. On 5 March the Austrian and Hungarian Estates jointly requested Frederick III to renounce the guardianship of their young sovereign. Frederick, who had been crowned Holy Roman Emperor, initially refused to satisfy their demand. Hunyadi convoked a Diet to discuss the situation, but before the Diet made any decision the united troops of the Austrian and Bohemian Estates forced the Emperor to hand over the young monarch to Count Ulrich of Celje on 4 September. In the meantime, Hunyadi had met Jiskra in Körmöcbánya (present-day Kremnica, Slovakia) where they concluded a treaty on 24 August. According to the treaty, Jiskra retained Léva (present-day Levica, Slovakia) and his right to collect the "thirtieth"—a custom duty—at Késmárk (present-day Kežmarok, Slovakia) and Ólubló (present-day Stará Ľubovňa, Slovakia). In September Hunyadi sent envoys to Constantinople and promised military assistance to the Byzantine Emperor Constantine XI. In exchange, he demanded two Byzantine forts on the Black Sea, Silivri and Misivri, but the Emperor refused.

Hunyadi convoked a Diet to Buda, but the barons and the prelates preferred to visit Ladislaus V in Vienna in November. At the Diet of Vienna, Hunyadi renounced the regency, but the King appointed him "captain general of the kingdom" on 30 January 1453. The King even authorized Hunyadi to keep the royal castles and royal revenues that he possessed at that time. Hunyadi also received Bistritz (present-day Bistrița, Romania)—a district of the Transylvanian Saxons—with the title "perpetual count" from Ladislaus V, which was the first grant of a hereditary title in the Kingdom of Hungary.

=== Conflicts and reconciliations (1453–1455) ===
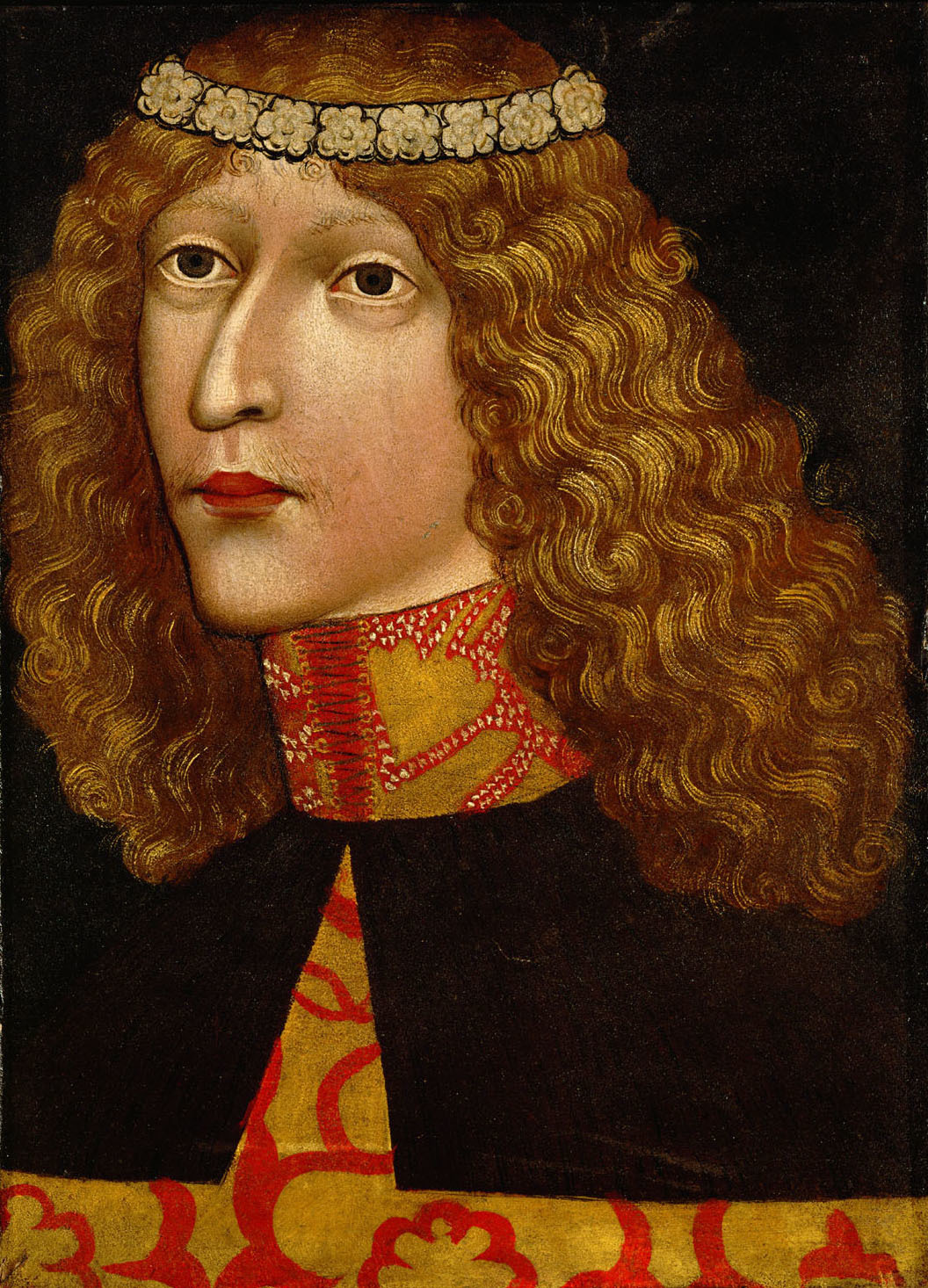
Ladislaus the Posthumous, King of Hungary and Bohemia, and Duke of Austria

In a letter of 28 April 1453, Aeneas Silvius Piccolomini—the future Pope Pius II—stated that King Ladislaus V's realms were administered by "three men": Hungary by Hunyadi, Bohemia by George of Poděbrady, and Austria by Ulrich of Celje. However, Hunyadi's position gradually weakened, because even many of his former allies considered his acts to retain his power with suspicion. The citizens of Beszterce forced him to issue a charter confirming their traditional liberties on 22 July. Hunyadi's longtime friend, Nicholas Újlaki made a formal alliance with Palatine Ladislaus Garai and Judge royal Ladislaus Pálóci, declaring their intention to restore royal authority in September.

Hunyadi accompanied the young King to Prague and concluded a treaty with Ulrich Eizinger (who had expelled Ulrich of Celje from Austria) and George of Poděbrady at the end of the year. Having returned to Hungary, Hunyadi convoked, in the name of the King but without his authorization, a Diet in order to make preparations for a war on the Ottomans who had in May 1453 captured Constantinople. The Diet ordered the mobilization of the armed forces and Hunyadi's position of supreme commander was confirmed for a year, but many of the decisions was never carried out. For instance, the Diet obliged all landowners to equip four cavalrymen and two infantrymen for every hundred peasant households on their domains, but this law was never applied in practise.

Ladislaus V convoked a new Diet which assembled in March or April. At the Diet, his envoys—three Austrian noblemen—announced that the King was planning to administer royal revenues through officials elected by the Diet and to set up two councils (also with members elected by the Estates) in order to assist him in governing the country. However, the Diet refused to ratify most of the royal proposals, only the establishment of a royal council consisting of six prelates, six barons and six noblemen was accepted. Hunyadi, who was well aware that the King attempted to limit his authority, demanded an explanation, but the King denied that he had knowledge of his representatives' act. On the other hand, Jiskra returned to Hungary upon Ladislaus V's request and the King entrusted him with the administration of the mining towns. In response, Hunyadi persuaded Ulrich of Celje to cede him a number of royal fortresses (and the lands pertaining to them) which had been mortgaged in Trencsén County.

The Ottoman Sultan, Mehmed II invaded Serbia in May 1454 and laid siege to Smederevo, thus violating the truce of November 1451 between his empire and Hungary. Hunyadi decided to intervene and started to assemble his armies at Belgrade, forcing the Sultan to lift the siege and leave Serbia in August. However, an Ottoman force of 32,000 strong continued to pillage Serbia up until Hunyadi routed them at Kruševac on 29 September. He made a raid against the Ottoman Empire and destroyed Vidin before returning to Belgrade.

Emperor Frederick III convoked the Imperial Diet to Wiener Neustadt to discuss the possibilities of a new crusade against the Ottomans. At the conference, where the envoys of the Hungarian, Polish, Aragonese and Burgundian monarchs were also present, no final decisions were made, because the Emperor refrained from a sudden attack against the Ottomans. According to Aeneas Silvius Piccolomini, the Emperor hindered Hunyadi from participating at the meeting. In contrast with the Emperor, the new Pope, Callixtus III was a fierce supporter of the crusade.

King Ladislaus V visited Buda in February 1456. Ulrich of Celje, who accompanied the King to Buda, confirmed his former alliance with Ladislaus Garai and Nicholaus Újlaki. The three barons turned against Hunyadi and accused him of abusing his authority. A new Ottoman invasion against Serbia promoted a new reconciliation between Hunyadi and his opponents, and Hunyadi resigned the administration of part of the royal revenues and three royal fortresses, including Buda. On the other hand, Hunyadi, Garai and Újlaki made an agreement that they would refrain the King from employing foreigners in the royal administration in June 1455. Hunyadi and Count Ulrich were also reconciled in next month, when Hunyadi's younger son, Matthias and the Count's daughter, Elizabeth were engaged.

=== Belgrade victory and death (1455–1456) ===
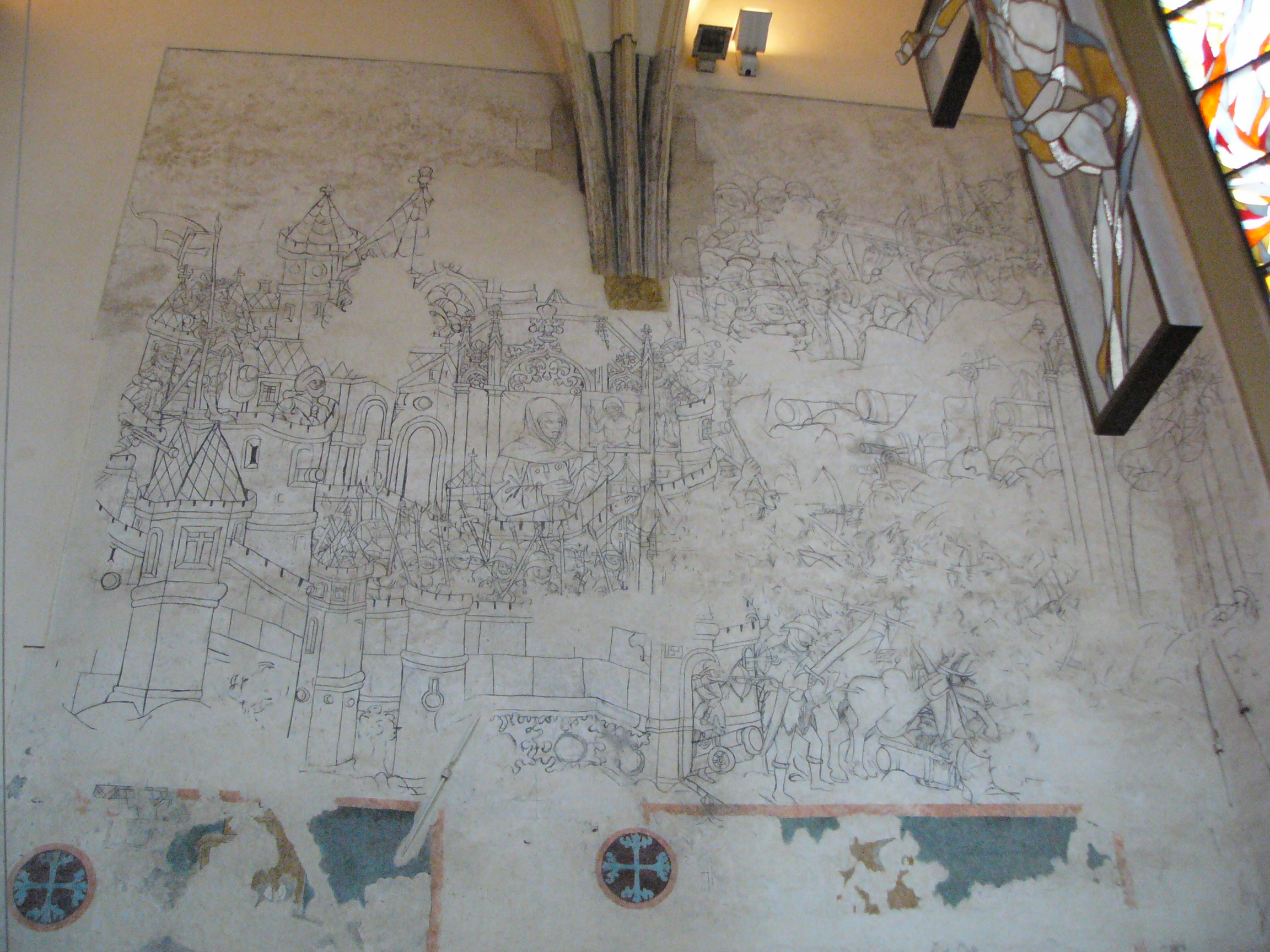
Gothic fresco of the Siege of Belgrade in the Church of Immaculate Conception of Virgin Mary in Olomouc (1468)

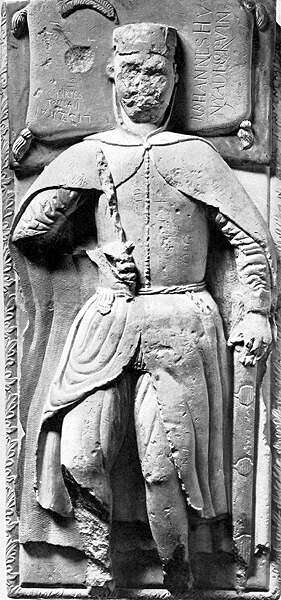
Hunyadi's tomb in Gyulafehérvár / Alba Iulia Catholic Cathedral.

Envoys from Ragusa (Dubrovnik, Croatia) were the first to have informed the Hungarian leaders of the preparations that Mehmed II had made for an invasion against Hungary. In a letter addressed to Hunyadi, whom he styled as "the Maccabeus of our time", the papal legate, Cardinal Juan Carvajal made it clear that there was not much chance of foreign assistance against the Ottomans. With the Ottomans' support, Vladislav II of Wallachia even plundered the southern parts of Transylvania in late 1455.

John of Capistrano, a Franciscan friar and papal inquisitor, started to preach an anti-Ottoman crusade in Hungary in February 1456. The Diet ordered the mobilization of the armed forces in April, but most barons failed to obey and continued to war against their local adversaries, including the Hussites in Upper Hungary. Before departing from Transylvania against the Ottomans, Hunyadi had to face a rebellion by the Vlachs in Fogaras County. He also supported Vlad Dracula—a son of the late Vlad Dracul—to seize the Wallachian throne from Vladislav II.

King Ladislaus V left Hungary for Vienna in May. Hunyadi hired 5,000 Hungarian, Czech and Polish mercenaries and sent them to Belgrade, which was the key fortress of the defense of Hungary's southern frontiers. The Ottoman forces marched through Serbia and approached Nándorfehérvár (modern-day Belgrade) in June. A crusade made up mostly of peasants from the nearby counties, who had been roused by John of Capistrano's fiery oratory, also started to assemble at the fortress in the first days of July. The Ottoman siege of Belgrade, which was personally commanded by Sultan Mehmed II, began with the bombardment of the walls on 4 July.

Hunyadi proceeded to form a relief army, and assembled a fleet of 200 ships on the Danube. The flotilla assembled by Hunyadi destroyed the Ottoman fleet on 14 July. This triumph prevented the Ottomans from completing the blockade, enabling Hunyadi and his troops to enter the fortress. The Ottomans started a general assault on 21 July. With the assistance of crusaders who were continuously arriving to the fortress, Hunyadi repulsed the fierce attacks by the Ottomans and broke into their camp on 22 July. Although wounded during the fights, Sultan Mehmed II, decided to resist, but a riot in his camp forced him to lift the siege and retreat from Belgrade during the night.

The crusaders' victory over the Sultan who had conquered Constantinople generated enthusiasm throughout Europe. Processions to celebrate Hunyadi's triumph were made in Venice and Oxford. However, in the crusaders' camp unrest was growing, because the peasants denied that the barons had played any role in the victory. In order to avoid an open rebellion, Hunyadi and Capistrano disbanded the crusaders' army.

Meanwhile, a plague had broken out and killed many people in the crusaders' camp. Hunyadi was also taken ill and died near Zimony (present-day Zemun, Serbia) on 11 August. He was buried in the Roman Catholic St. Michael's Cathedral in Gyulafehérvár (Alba Iulia).

[Hunyadi] governed the country with an iron rod, as they say, and while the king was away he was regarded as his equal. After routing the Turks at Belgrade [...], he survived for a brief time before dying of disease. When he was ill, they say that he forbade the Body of Our Lord to be brought to him, declaring that it was unworthy for a king to enter the house of a servant. Although his strength was failing, he ordered himself to be carried out to church, where he made his confession in Christian way, received the divine Eucharist, and surrendered his soul to God in the arms of the priests. Fortunate soul to have arrived in Heaven as both herald and author of the heroic action at Belgrade.

— Aeneas Silvius Piccolomini: Europe

== Family ==
Personal Coat of arms – note the raven depicted on the escutcheon, the origin of the name Corvinus.

In 1432, Hunyadi married Erzsébet Szilágyi (c. 1410–1483), a Hungarian noblewoman. John Hunyadi had two children, Ladislaus and Matthias Corvinus. The former was executed on the order of King Ladislaus V for the murder of Ulrich II of Celje, a relative of the king. The latter was elected king on 20 January 1458, Matthias after Ladislaus V's death. It was the first time in the history of the Kingdom of Hungary that a member of the nobility, without dynastic ancestry and relationship, mounted the royal throne.

== Legacy ==
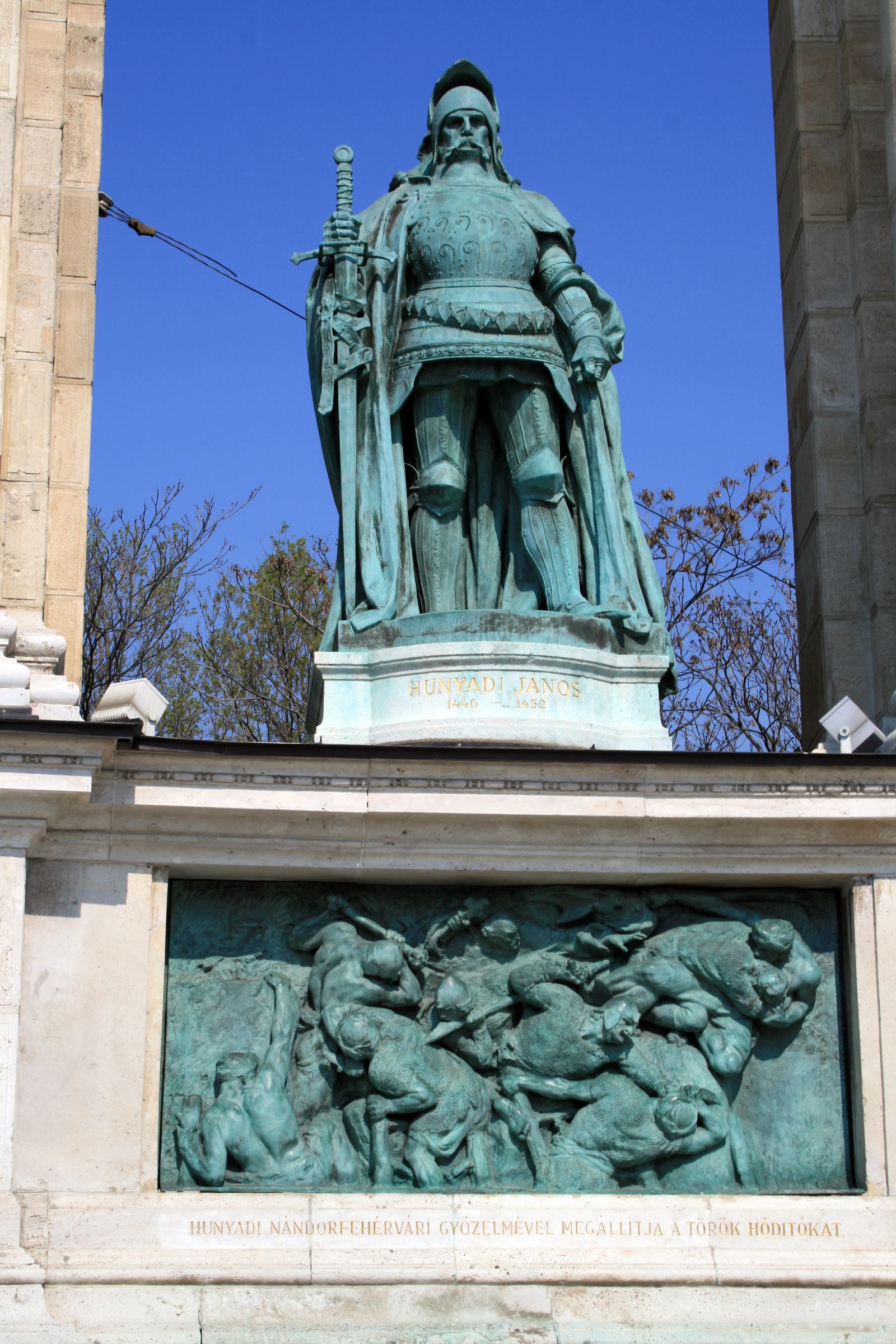
Statue of Hunyadi, Heroes' Square, Budapest, Hungary

=== The noon bell ===
Pope Callixtus III ordered the bells of every European church to be rung every day at noon, as a call for believers to pray for the Christian defenders of the city of Belgrade. The practice of noon bell is traditionally attributed to the international commemoration of the Belgrade victory and to the order of Pope Callixtus III.

The custom still exists even among Protestant and Orthodox congregations. In the history of Oxford University, the victory was welcomed with a peal of bells and great celebrations in England too. Hunyadi sent a special courier (among others), Erasmus Fullar, to Oxford with the news of the victory.

=== The national hero ===
Along with his son Matthias Corvinus, Hunyadi is considered a Hungarian national hero and praised as its defender against the Ottoman threat.

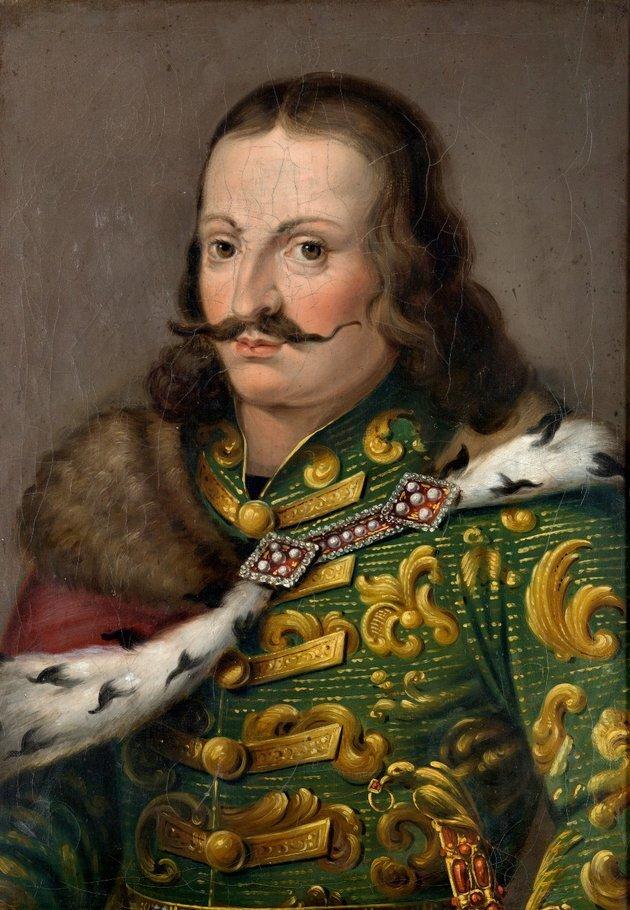
19th century painting of Hunyadi in a green dolman, as worn by Hungarian hussars. Painting by Béla Schäffer

Romanian historiography adopted Hunyadi and gives him a place of importance in the history of Romania too. However, Romanian national consciousness did not embrace him to the extent that Hungarian national conscience did. John Hunyadi, a Hungarian hero, was subordinated to the ideology of National Communism in the era of Ceaușescu and transmuted into a hero of Romania.

Pope Pius II (r. 1458-1464) writes that "Hunyadi did not increase so much the glory of the Hungarians, but especially the glory of the Romanians among whom he was born."

The French writer and diplomat Philippe de Commines (1447–1511) described Hunyadi as "a very valiant gentleman, called the White Knight of Wallachia, a person of great honour and prudence, who for a long time had governed the kingdom of Hungary, and had gained several battles over the Turks".

Pietro Ranzano wrote in his work Annales omnium temporum (1490–1492) that John Hunyadi was commonly called "Ianco"' („Ioanne Huniate, Ianco vulgo cognominator). In chronicles written by Byzantine Greek authors (such as George Sphrantzes and Laonikos Chalkokondyles) he is called „Ianco/Iango", „Iancou/Iangou", „Iancos/Iangos", „Iancoula/Iangoula", „Gianco/Giango" and „Ghiangou"

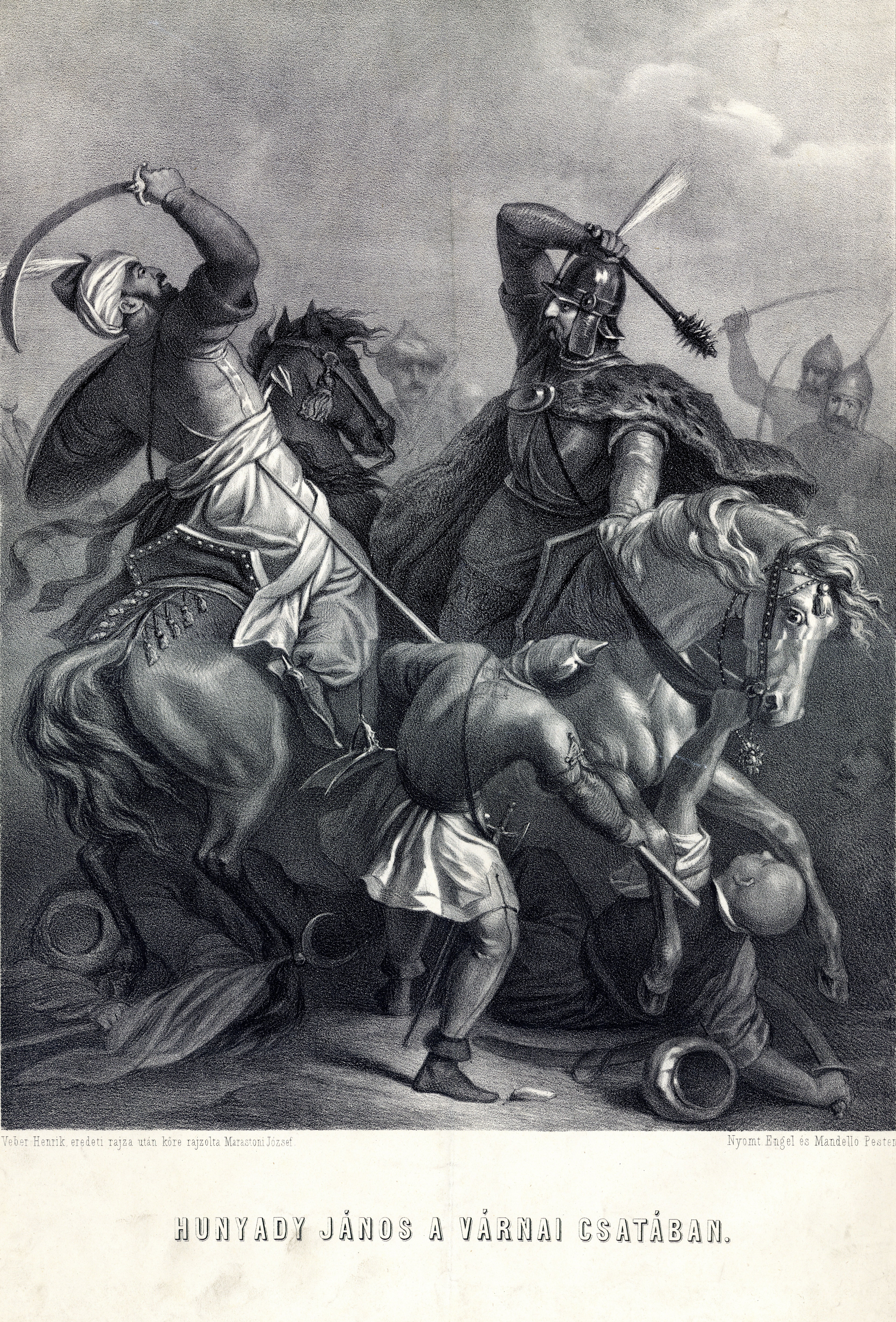
Lithograph picture of John Hunyadi fighting against the Ottomans in the Battle of Varna, made by József Marastoni.

Byzantine literature treated Hunyadi as a saint:

First, I glorify the Emperor of Hellas
who Alexander the Macedon, the son of Olympias.
The Christian Emperor, who is the peak and the root
and found the cross, the mighty Constantine.
And the third one is the absolutely marvelous Emperor John.
How to write a tribute for him
and should my mind how rise to exalted praise?
Because like the two Emperors mentioned above
I also pay such respect to the above Emperor.
It is worthy and appropriate that the Church of Rome
and the whole generation of Eastern and Western Christians
respectfully draw a full memory of the present.
Who became famous in the battles of wars
the brave and the timid ones and all the generations, I say,
to fall before John of Hungary today,
glorify him as a knight
glorify him today as an Emperor,
together with the ancient, mighty, and brave Samson,
with the terrible Alexander and the mighty Constantine.
I glorify the evangelists, I also glorify the prophets,
and the mighty Saints fighting for Christ,
and among them, I glorify Emperor John.

— Greek poem on the Battle of Varna

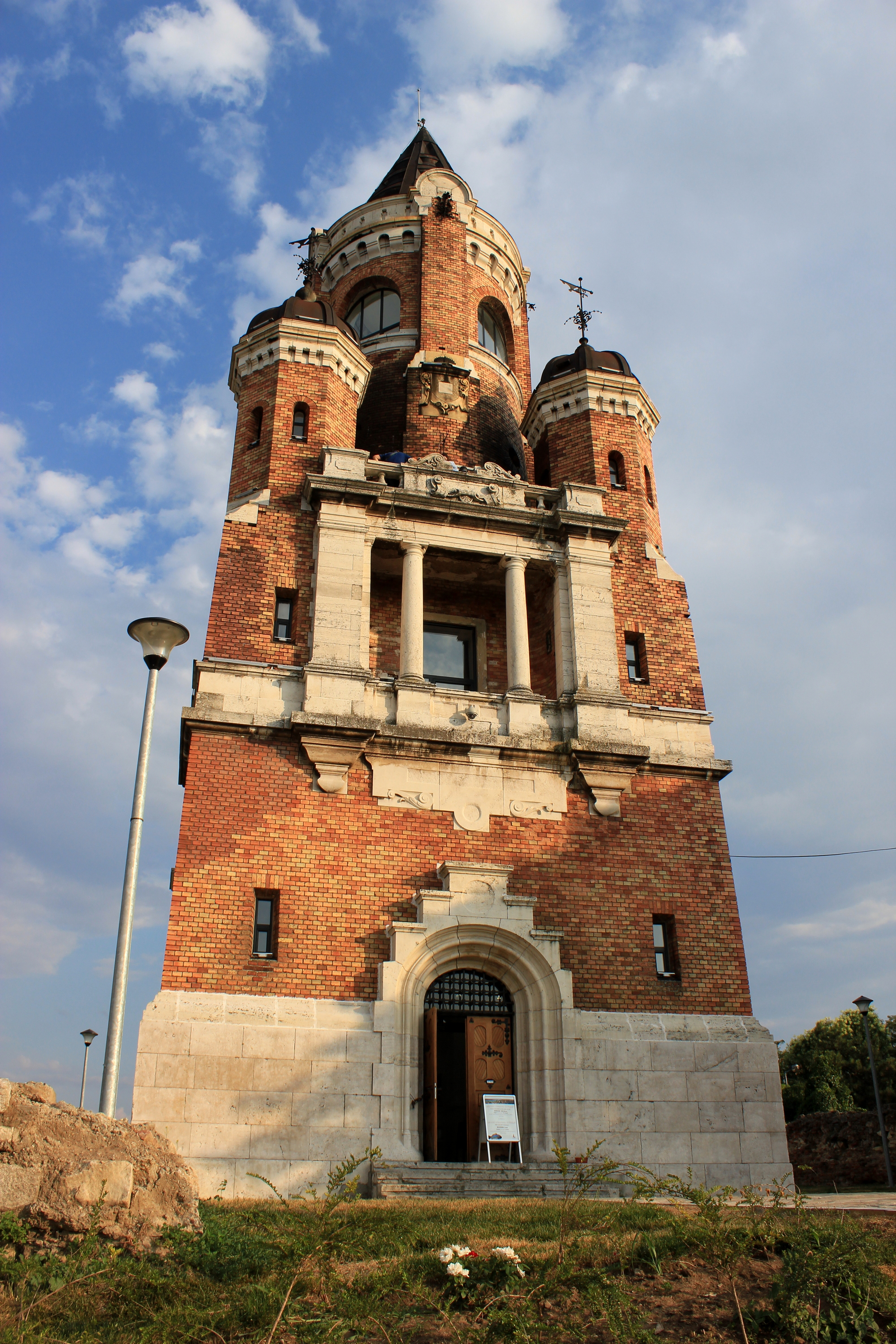
The Tower of John Hunyadi at the remains of the Zemun Fortress, Belgrade, Serbia

Hunyadi was "recognised as being Hungarian..." and "frequently called Ugrin Janko, 'Janko the Hungarian'" in the Serbian and Croatian societies of the 15th century, while another bugarštica makes him of Serbian origin. According to a bugarštica (a Serbian popular poem), he was the son of Despot Stefan Lazarević and Stefan's alleged wife, a girl from Hermannstadt/Nagyszeben (present-day Sibiu, Romania). Actually, the Despot did not father any children. He is also portrayed as an ardent supporter of the Catholicization of Orthodox peoples.

In Bulgarian folklore, the memory of Hunyadi was preserved in the epic song hero character of Yankul(a) Voivoda, along with Sekula Detentse, a fictitious hero perhaps inspired by Hunyadi's nephew, Thomas Székely.

Iancu de Hunedoara National College in Hunedoara, Romania is named after him.

== In literature and popular culture ==
John Hunyadi was subsidiary to Roger de Flor as the role model for the fictional character of Tirant lo Blanc, the epic romance written by Joanot Martorell, published in Valencia in 1490. They both shared, for instance, the device of a raven on their shield.

In 1515, the English printer Wynkyn de Worde published a long metrical romance called 'Capystranus', a graphic account of the defeat of the Turks.

In 1791, Hannah Brand produced a new play called 'Huniades or The Siege of Belgrade', which played to a packed house in the King's Theatre, Norwich.

In 1848, the Hunyadi March composed by Franz Doppler, based on motifs from Ferenc Erkel's opera Hunyadi László with his permission, became part of Hungary's military march tradition.

Hungarian genre author Mór Bán wrote a thirteen-part historical fantasy adventure book series about a fictionalized biography of Hunyadi, released between 2008 and 2023.

The book series was adapted to a television miniseries, Rise of the Raven, released in 2025. The series features over 600 international actors, and the production is unique in that the actors speak in their native languages, adding to its historical authenticity. In Rise of the Raven, John Hunyadi devotes his life to defending Europe against the Ottoman invasion. Amid political intrigue and betrayal, and conspiracies between noble families from Hungary, Austria, Italy, Poland, Serbia, his key allies are his wife Elizabeth, who fights alongside him, and Mara, his first love, who becomes Sultan Murad's concubine. As the Ottoman Empire mobilizes an enormous army to conquer Hungary, Hunyadi leads his smaller but formidable forces into battle, sealing a hard-fought victory at the Siege of Belgrade.

== Gallery ==
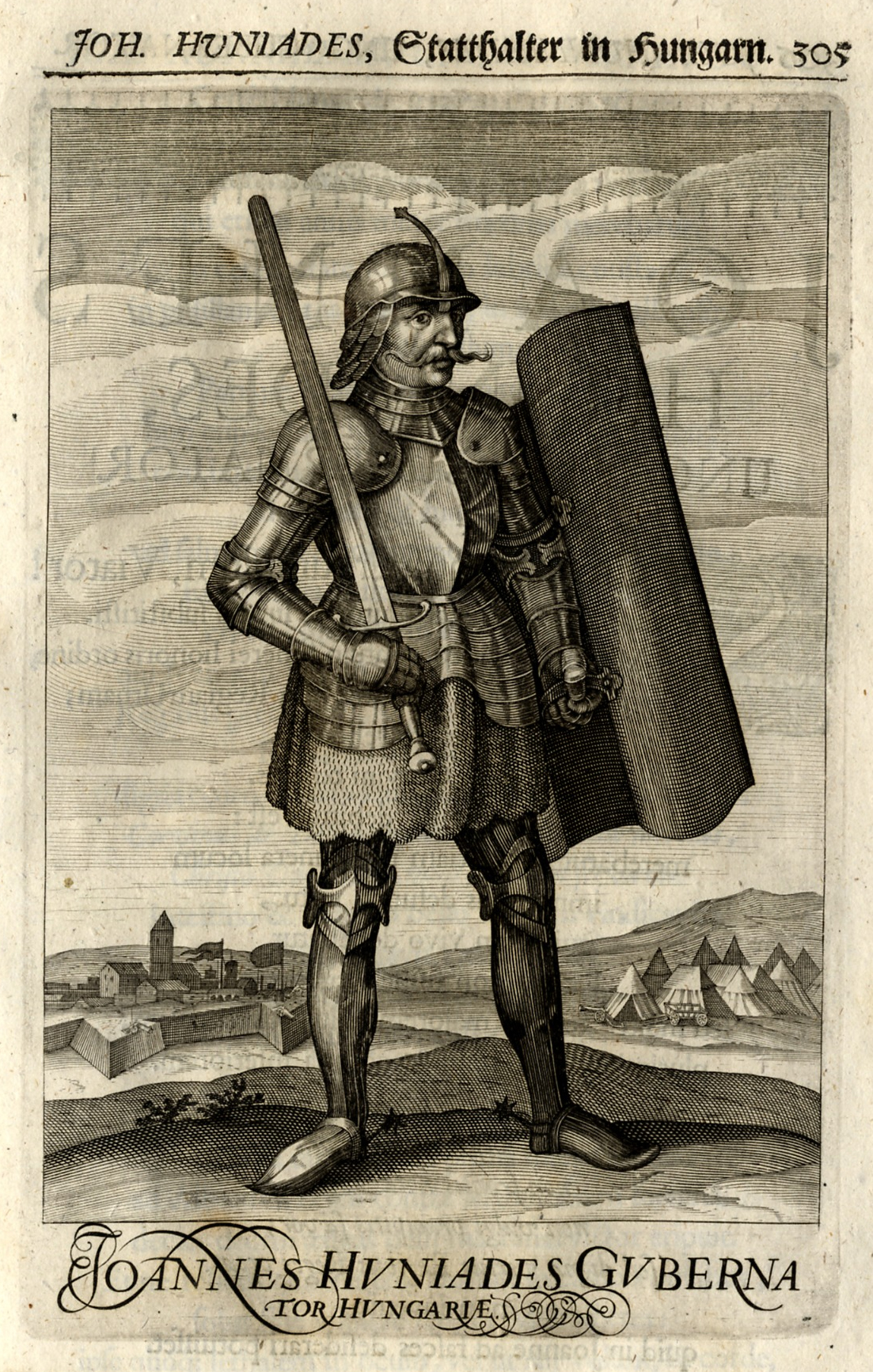
John Hunyadi (Nádasdy Mausoleum, 1664)

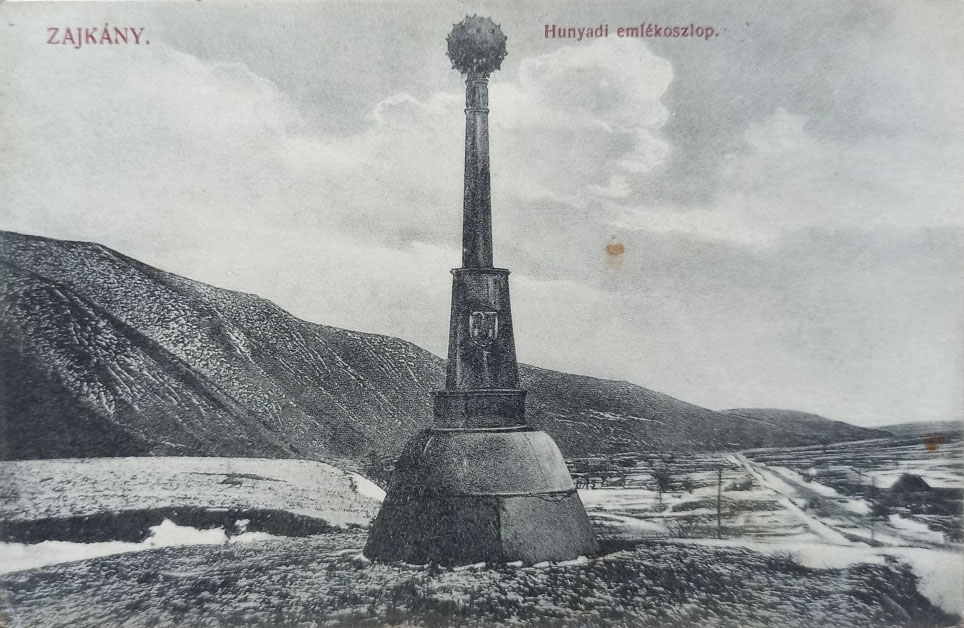
Battle memorial of John Hunyadi near the Transylvanian Iron Gate, in Zajkány, Hunyad County, Kingdom of Hungary (now Zeicani, Romania), erected in 1896 and destroyed in 1992

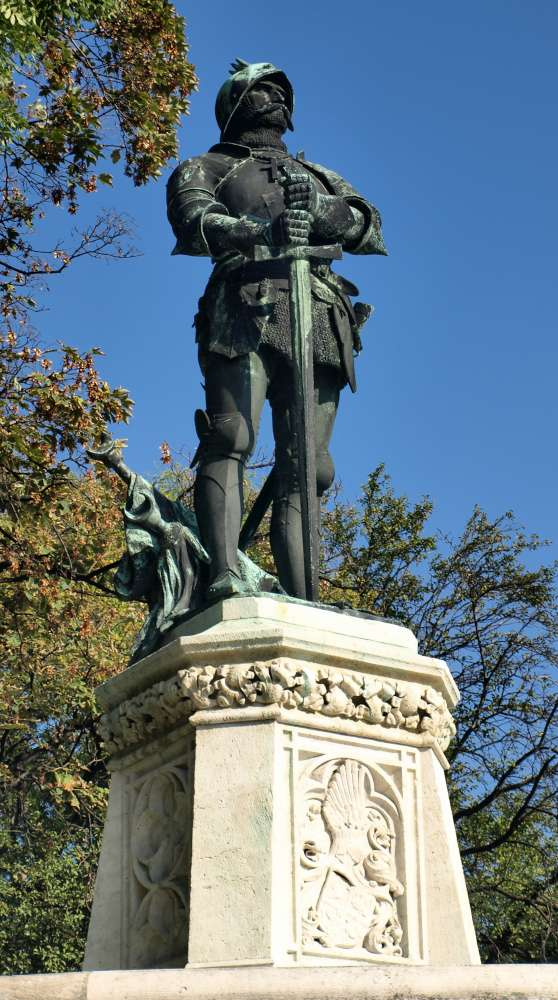
Statue of John Hunyadi in the Royal Castle in Budapest, Hungary (made by István Tóth in 1903)

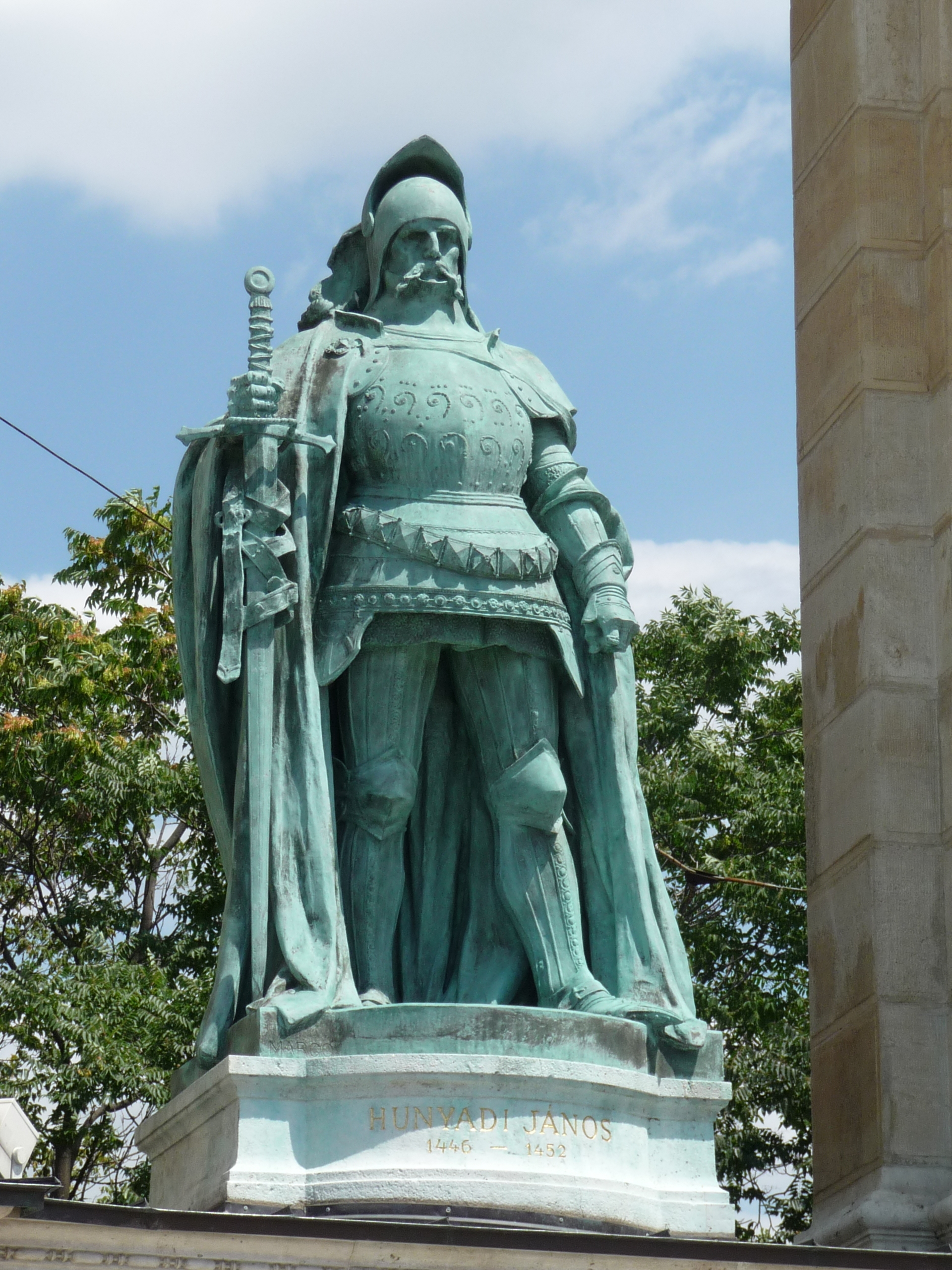
Statue of John Hunyadi at the Heroes' Square, Budapest, Hungary (made by Ede Margó in 1906)

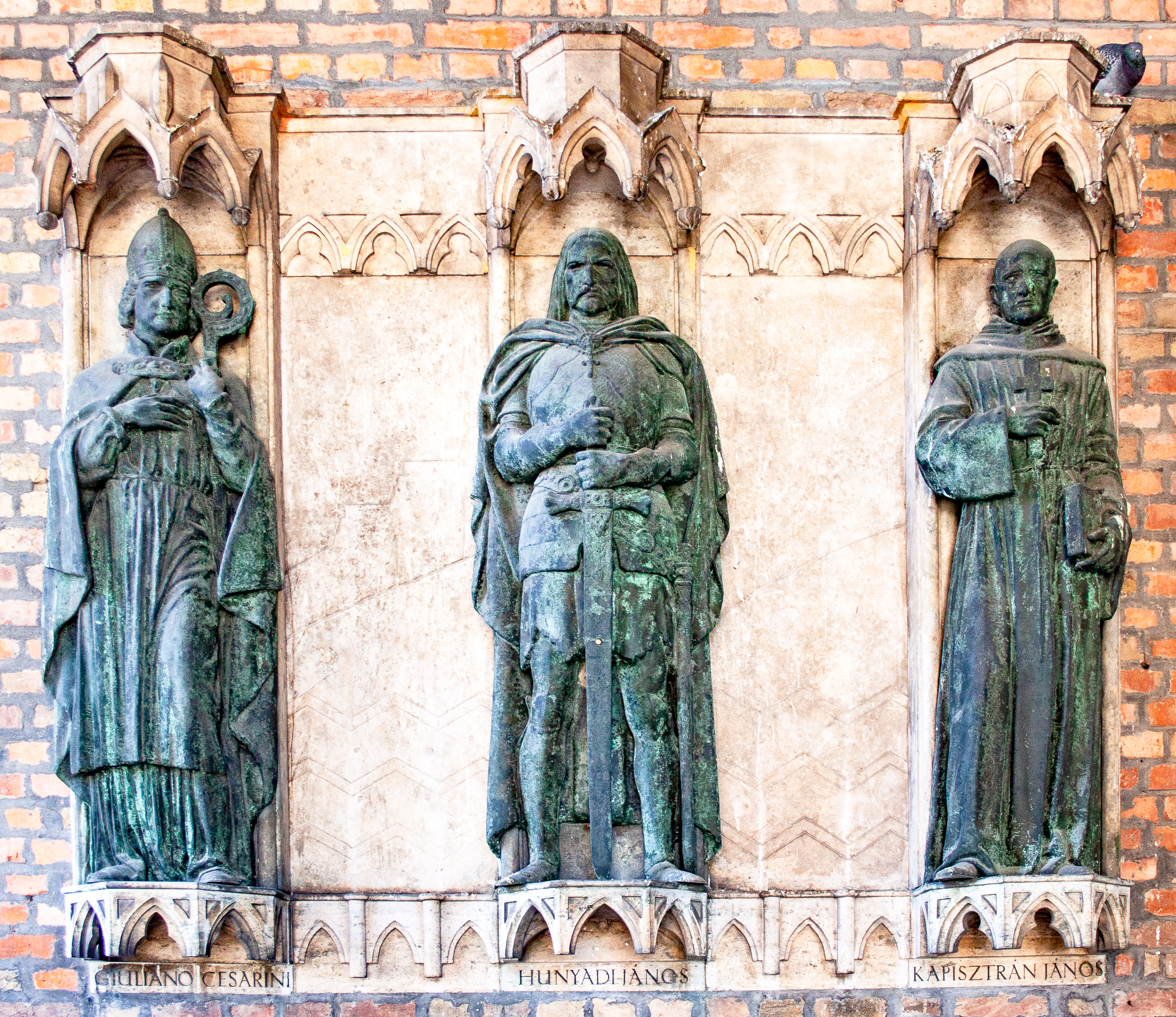
Statues of Julian Cesarini, John Hunyadi and John of Capistrano in Szeged, Hungary (made by Ferenc Sidló in 1930)

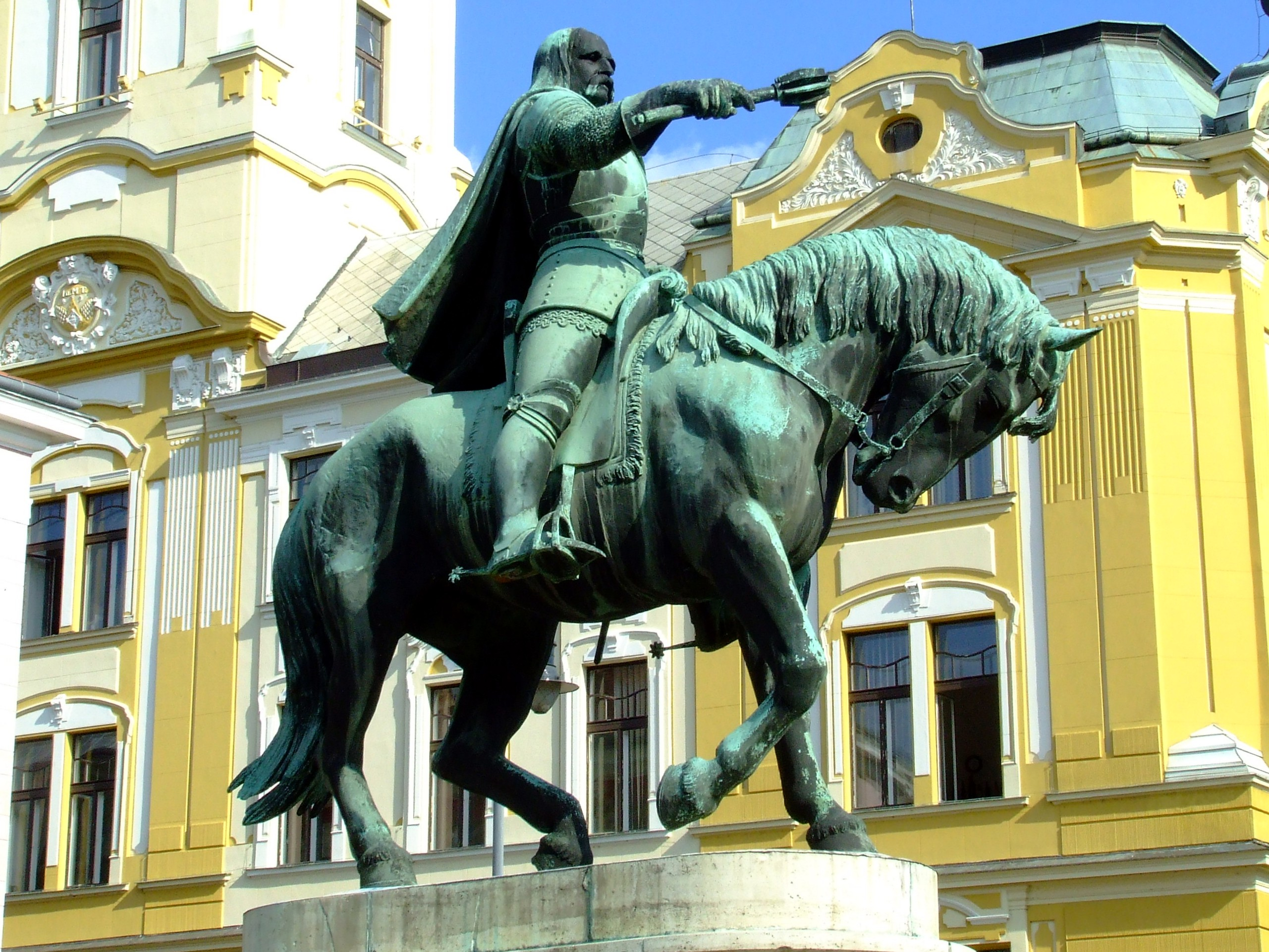
Statue of John Hunyadi in Pécs, Hungary (made by Pál Pátzay in 1956)

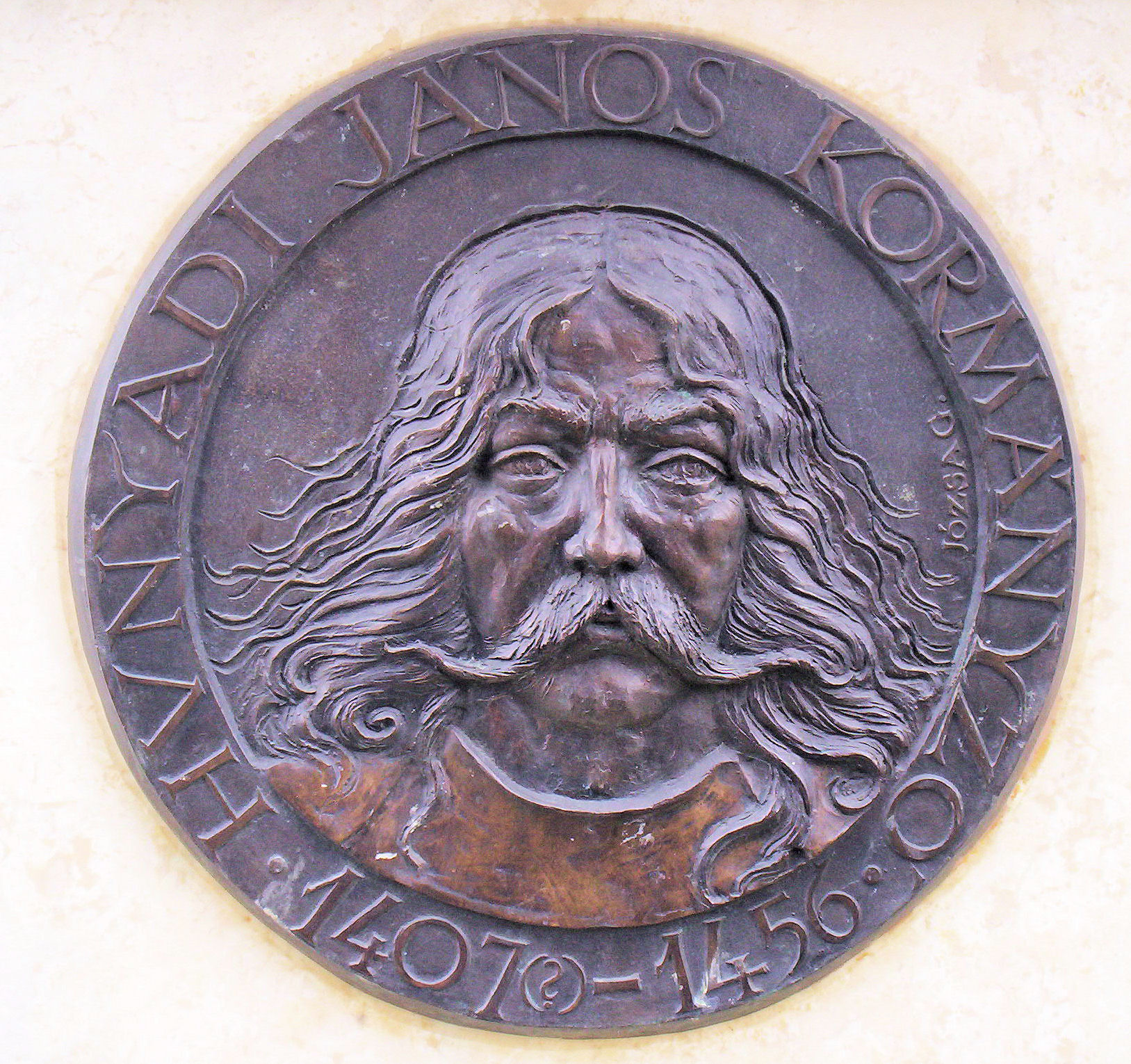
Relief of John Hunyadi on the pedestal of the statue of Matthias Corvinus in Szeged, Hungary (made by Gábor Józsa in 2001)

== Sources ==
=== Primary sources ===
- Aeneas Silvius Piccolomini: Europe (c. 1400–1458) (Translated by Robert Brown, introduced and commented by Nancy Bisaha) (2013). The Catholic University of America press. ISBN 978-0-8132-2182-3.
- The Annals of Jan Długosz (An English abridgement by Maurice Michael, with commentary by Paul Smith) (1997). IM Publications. ISBN 1-901019-00-4.

=== Secondary sources ===
- Jefferson, John (2012). The Holy Wars of King Wladislas and Sultan Murad: The Ottoman-Christian Conflict from 1438–1444. Leiden: Brill Publishers. ISBN 978-90-04-21904-5.
- Babinger, Franz (1978). Mehmed the Conqueror and His Time. Princeton University Press. ISBN 0-691-09900-6.
- Bain, Robert Nisbet (1911). "Hunyadi, János" . In Chisholm, Hugh (ed.). Encyclopædia Britannica. Vol. 13 (11th ed.). Cambridge University Press. pp. 955–956.
- Bak, János (1994). "The Late Medieval Period, 1382–1526". In Sugar, Peter F.; Hanák, Péter; Frank, Tibor (eds.). A History of Hungary. Indiana University Press. pp. 54–82. ISBN 963-7081-01-1.
- Bartl, Július; Čičaj, Viliam; Kohútova, Mária; Letz, Róbert; Segeš, Vladimír; Škvarna, Dušan (2002). Slovak History: Chronology & Lexicon. Bolchazy-Carducci Publishers, Slovenské Pedegogické Nakladatel'stvo. ISBN 0-86516-444-4.
- Boia, Lucian (2001). History and Myth in Romanian Consciousness. CEU Press. ISBN 963-9116-96-3.
- Bolovan, Ioan; Constantiniu, Florin; Michelson, Paul E.; Pop, Ioan Aurel; Popa, Cristian; Popa, Marcel; Scurtu, Ioan; Treptow, Kurt W.; Vultur, Marcela; Watts, Larry L. (1997). A History of Romania. The Center for Romanian Studies. ISBN 973-98091-0-3.
- Cartledge, Bryan (2011). The Will to Survive: A History of Hungary. C. Hurst & Co. ISBN 978-1-84904-112-6.
- Chadwick, H. Munro; Chadwick, Nora K. (2010). The Growth of Literature, Volume 2. Cambridge University Press. ISBN 978-0-521-31019-2.
- E. Kovács, Péter (1990). Matthias Corvinus (in Hungarian). Officina Nova. ISBN 963-7835-49-0.
- Engel, Pál (2001). The Realm of St Stephen: A History of Medieval Hungary, 895–1526. I.B. Tauris Publishers. ISBN 1-86064-061-3.
- Engel, Pál (2003). "Hunyadi pályakezdése [Hunyadi's early career]". In Csukovits, Enikő (ed.). Engel Pál. Honor, vár, ispánság: Válogatott tanulmányok [Pál Engel. Honour, Castle and County: Selected Studies]. Osiris Kiadó. pp. 512–526. ISBN 963-389-392-5.
- Fine, John V. A (1994). The Late Medieval Balkans: A Critical Survey from the Late Twelfth Century to the Ottoman Conquest. The University of Michigan Press. ISBN 0-472-08260-4.
- Hebron, Malcolm (1997). The Medieval Siege: Theme and Image in Middle English Romance. Clarendon Press. ISBN 0-19-818620-7.
- Kubinyi, András (2008). Matthias Rex. Balassi Kiadó. ISBN 978-963-506-767-1.
- Makkai, László (1994). "The Three Nations of Transylvania (1360–1526)". In Köpeczi, Béla; Barta, Gábor; Bóna, István; Makkai, László; Szász, Zoltán; Borus, Judit (eds.). History of Transylvania. Akadémiai Kiadó. pp. 178–243. ISBN 963-05-6703-2.
- Molnár, Miklós (2001). A Concise History of Hungary. Cambridge University Press. ISBN 978-0-521-66736-4.
- Mureșanu, Camil (2001). John Hunyadi: Defender of Christendom. The Center for Romanian Studies. ISBN 973-9432-18-2.
- Nagy, Levente; Szilágyi, Emőke Rita (2023). "Hollókőtől Esztergomig. Új adatok az Oláh, a Hunyadi és a Drakula család genealógiájához" [From Hollókő to Esztergom. New Data on the Genealogy of the Oláh, Hunyadi and Dracula Families] (PDF). Történelmi Szemle (in Hungarian). Hungarian Academy of Sciences. ISSN 0040-9634.
- Pálosfalvi, Tamás (2018). From Nicopolis to Mohács: A History of Ottoman-Hungarian Warfare, 1389–1526. The Ottoman Empire and Its Heritage: Politics, Society and Economy 63. Leiden: Brill. ISBN 978-90-04-37565-9.
- Pop, Ioan-Aurel (2005). "Transylvania in the 14th century and the first half of the 15th century (1300–1456)". In Pop, Ioan-Aurel; Nägler, Thomas (eds.). The History of Transylvania, Vol. I. (Until 1541). Romanian Cultural Institute (Center for Transylvanian Studies). pp. 247–298. ISBN 973-7784-00-6.
- Pop, Ioan-Aurel (2012). "The Names in the Family of King Matthias Corvinus: From Old Sources to Contemporary Historiography" (PDF). Ethnographica et Folkloristica Carpathica. 17 / 35. Debreceni Egyetem Néprajzi Tanszék: 11–40. ISSN 0139-0600.
- Stavrianos, L. S. (2000). The Balkans since 1453 (with a new Introduction by Traian Stoianovich). Hurst & Company. ISBN 978-1-85065-551-0.
- Tanner, Marcus (2009). The Raven King: Matthias Corvinus and the Fate of his Lost Library. Yale University Press. ISBN 978-0-300-15828-1.
- Teke, Zsuzsa (1980). Hunyadi János és kora [John Hunyadi and his Times] (in Hungarian). Gondolat. ISBN 963-280-951-3.
- Varga, Domokos (1982). Hungary in Greatness and Decline: the 14th and 15th centuries. Hungarian Cultural Foundation. ISBN 0-914648-11-X.
- Vaughan, Richard (2002). Philip the Good: The Apogee of Burgundy. The Boydell Press. ISBN 978-0-85115-917-1.
- Wheatcroft, Andrew (2009). The Enemy at the Gate: Habsburgs, Ottomans, and the Battle for Europe. Basic Books. ISBN 978-0-465-01374-6.

Political offices
Preceded by Franko Talovac	Ban of Severin alongside John Hunyadi, Jr. (1439–1440) alongside Nicholas Újlaki (1445–1446); 1439–1446	Succeeded by vacant
Preceded by Ladislaus Jakcs & Michael Jakcs	Voivode of Transylvania alongside Nicholas Újlaki; 1441–1446	Succeeded by Nicholas Újlaki & Emeric Bebek
Preceded by Emeric Bebek & Stephen Bánfi	Count of the Székelys alongside Nicholas Újlaki; 1441–1446	Succeeded by Francis Csáki
Preceded by George Orbonász	Ispán of Temes alongside Nicholas Újlaki (1441–1446); 1441–1456	Succeeded by Ladislaus Hunyadi
Preceded by Seven captains	Regent of Hungary; 1446–1453	Succeeded by Ladislaus V as King
Preceded by Sebastian Rozgonyi	Ispán of Pozsony; 1450–1452	Succeeded by Ladislaus Hunyadi
Preceded by Ulrich II, Count of Celje	Ispán of Trencsén; 1454–1456	Succeeded by Ladislaus Hunyadi
