= Captain in Chief =

Temporary Hungarian Council

The Captain in Chief (Hungarian: Főkapitányok) were a group of regents elected in 1445 by the Hungarian Estates to govern the Kingdom of Hungary during the minority of King Ladislaus V. The council comprised seven members: John Hunyadi, Nicholas Újlaki, George Rozgonyi, Emeric Bebek, Michael Ország, Pongrac Szentmiklósi, and John Jiskra. This collective regency, however, remained in power for only one year. In 1446, the Diet of Hungary dissolved the council and appointed John Hunyadi as sole regent, granting him broad authority to address the kingdom's military and political challenges.

== History ==
The Captains emerged as a governing body following the death of Władysław III of Poland (also known as Vladislaus I of Hungary) at the Battle of Varna in 1444. The kingdom was left without a monarch, prompting the Hungarian Estates to elect Ladislaus the Posthumous, the infant son of the late King Albert II, Holy Roman Emperor, as titular king. However, Ladislaus remained under the custody of his guardian, Frederick III, Holy Roman Emperor, in Tyrol. Despite repeated demands by the Hungarian Estates for his release, Frederick refused, triggering political instability and infighting within Hungary’s central government.

To mitigate the crisis, the Estates temporarily abandoned efforts to appoint a single regent and instead established a collective regency in 1445. Seven nobles and influential figures were elected to govern distinct administrative regions (captaincies) across the kingdom.

=== Internal conflict ===
The regency period was marked by factional strife among the Hungarian nobility. Some members of the Captain in Chief exploited their authority for personal gain, notably Pongrác Szentmiklósi and John Jiskra, who operated as de facto robber barons, seizing lands and revenues.

=== Division over succession ===
The question of succession further polarized the nobility. A faction led by Emeric Bebek allied with Louis Aldemarisi (Hungarian: Lajos Aldemarisco) and Voivode Hrvoje to rally Slavonian nobles in support of Ladislaus’s legitimacy. Meanwhile, coastal cities such as Trau (Trogir), Sebenico (Šibenik), and Spalato (Split) in Dalmatia initially pledged allegiance to Alfonso V of Aragon, who claimed the Hungarian throne. By late 1445, however, these cities reversed their position and formally recognized Ladislaus as their sovereign.

== Death of members ==
=== Emeric III Bebek ===
Emeric III Bebek died in 1448 during the Second Battle of Kosovo, where he fought alongside John Hunyadi against the numerically superior forces of Sultan Murad II (outnumbered approximately 6:1). After three days of combat near modern-day Kosovo, Ottoman reinforcements from Wallachia (referred to in contemporary sources as Olahs) decisively routed the Hungarian army. Hunyadi narrowly escaped the battlefield but was robbed en route to safety, reportedly killing one assailant in self-defense. He was later captured near Szendrő (Smederevo) by Serbian despot Đurađ Branković, who held him prisoner until his release in 1449.

=== Michael Ország ===
Michael Ország, a key member of the Captain in Chief and later Palatine of Hungary, died in either early 1466 or 1484, with historical sources conflicting on the exact date. His death marked the end of a prominent political career spanning four decades.

== Voivodes of Transylvania ==
=== Emeric III Bebek ===
Following the dissolution of the Captain in Chief in 1446, Emeric III Bebek was reappointed as Voivode of Transylvania, a position he held until his death in 1448 at Rigómező (modern-day Șiria, Romania).

=== John Geréb de Vingárt ===
A key figure in Bebek’s administration was John Geréb de Vingárt, a scion of the influential Geréb noble family. Geréb rose from serving as castellan of Görgény (Gurghiu) to becoming Vice-Voivode of Transylvania under Bebek’s leadership, reflecting his growing political prominence in the region.

== Common myths ==
- Myth of five members: A frequent misconception asserts that the Captain in Chief comprised only five members. Historical records and primary sources confirm the council consisted of seven appointed regents.
- Hunyadi's accession date: Claims about a definitively known date for John Hunyadi's assumption of sole regency are unsubstantiated. While 1446 is widely cited (based on the Diet of Hungary's decree), some chronicles ambiguously reference 1448, reflecting discrepancies in medieval accounts.
