= Lower Danube Campaign =

- Part of the Ottoman–Hungarian wars and the Ottoman–Wallachian wars
Date	September 1445
Location	Ottoman Bulgaria and Wallachia
Result	Hungarian retreat Several fortresses were attacked Some fortresses were captured

Belligerents
Kingdom of Hungary; Principality of Wallachia; Supported by: Duchy of Burgundy; Papal States	Ottoman Empire

Commanders and leaders
John Hunyadi (Wallachia) Vlad II (Wallachia) Mircea II (Duchy of Burgundy) Walerand de Wavrin	Unknown

Strength
8,000–10,000 Hungarians; 6,000 Wallachians; Total: 14,000–16,000	30,000

The Lower Danube Campaign was fought between the army of the Kingdom of Hungary and the Ottoman Empire in 1445.

== Background ==
Returning from the successful campaign at Sarnó, Hunyadi strove with even greater effort to organize, as soon as possible, not only a border-defense force but also an army capable of offensive operations and of once again confronting the main Ottoman forces, using the remnants of the army from the Battle of Varna. Conditions seemed favorable for a new clash because, according to incoming reports, Sultan Murad had returned to Asia Minor after the Battle of Varna to his retreat at Magnesia, leaving the government once again to his son, Mehmed II, while in Adrianople the Janissaries had revolted against him. The situation became even more favorable when news arrived that the Burgundian embassy, entrusted with a mission by the Diet of Pest, had achieved complete success: the Wallachian voivode promised to take part in the planned campaign, and the Greek emperor had already handed over the Ottoman pretender to the commander of the Burgundian fleet, to whom the commander of the papal fleet had also joined with his ships.

== Campaign ==
According to the agreement, the army intended for the new campaign was to assemble at Nikopol, and since, according to the notice received from Hunyadi, he could not arrive there with his troops before September 8, the combined Burgundian and papal fleet—consisting of only six Italian and two Burgundian galleys—set out toward the mouth of the Danube only on August 16. True to his promise, Vald Dracul waited at Isaccea with a force of about 6,000 men and with boats heavily loaded with provisions for the army; together with the fleet he then set out toward Nikopol. On the way, the allies attempted to besiege Silistra, but upon learning that 30,000 Turks were stationed there, they continued their march. Meanwhile, they captured the more lightly defended Turtucaia and Giurgiu without great difficulty. On September 12, the allies laid siege to Little Nikopol on the left bank of the Danube and near the Ottomans, where two days later John Hunyadi also arrived with 10,000 men.

The commanders then assembled for a council of war to discuss further actions, but although it reportedly lasted several days, they could not reach a unanimous decision. Vlad Dracul insisted at all costs on continuing the siege of Little Nikopol and capturing the fortresses, whereas Hunyadi declared this pointless and a waste of time, arguing instead that the army should be transported onto Bulgarian territory in order to carry out decisive operations. Finally, much to Vlad Dracul’s annoyance, the council adopted the latter view, and the army advanced as far as the mouth of the Jiu River, where on September 29 and 30 it crossed the Danube at Rahova.

Not long after arriving at the camp at Rahova, news came that numerous Ottoman forces were gathering about two kilometers away. Hunyadi immediately drew up his army in battle formation, while he himself, accompanied by twelve horsemen, set out to reconnoiter the reported enemy.

The report proved true, because the enemy forces that had been at Silistra and Nikopol had been following the Christian army in parallel along the right bank of the Danube and had likewise halted opposite Rahova. However, when they saw the combined Hungarian, Wallachian, and Burgundian forces drawn up and ready for battle, they refused combat and, turning their backs, withdrew in good order into the interior of Bulgaria, intending to lure the Christians after them and strike under more favorable terrain conditions, and when their food supplies would already be running low and they would be weakened by hunger and fatigue.

Hunyadi, however, did not wish to grant his opponent this advantage. Considering the advanced season and the news that the old Sultan Murad, as soon as he learned of the dangerous situation of his son, had immediately appeared again in Europe and had suppressed the Janissaries’ revolt in its early stage, he proposed to his fellow commanders that the continuation of the campaign be postponed to a later time, when the promised support of Western princes would also arrive. This proposal was accepted, and the army crossed back to the left bank of the Danube. From there Hunyadi returned with his own troops to Hungary, the Wallachians to their homeland, and the papal and Burgundian galleys to Constantinople.

== Aftermath ==
Hunyadi informed the pope of this decision and its reasons in a letter dated November 29, 1445, once again assuring him that as soon as the princes of Europe provided sufficient aid to break the enemy of Christendom, he would always be ready to launch a larger-scale campaign.
