= George Rozgonyi =

15th century nobleman from Hungary

George Rozgonyi (Hungarian: Rozgonyi György, died in 1457 or 1458) was an influential lord in the Kingdom of Hungary in the 15th century. He was judge royal from 1441 to 1445 and one of the seven "captains in chief" between 1445 and 1446.

== Sources ==
- Engel, Pál (2001). The Realm of St Stephen: A History of Medieval Hungary, 895–1526. I.B. Tauris Publishers. ISBN 1-86064-061-3.
- Markó, László (2006). A magyar állam főméltóságai Szent Istvántól napjainkig: Életrajzi Lexikon [Great Officers of State in Hungary from King Saint Stephen to Our Days: A Biographical Encyclopedia] (in Hungarian). Helikon Kiadó. ISBN 963-547-085-1.
