= Thirtieth (tax) =

Tax on foreign trade in the Kingdom of Hungary

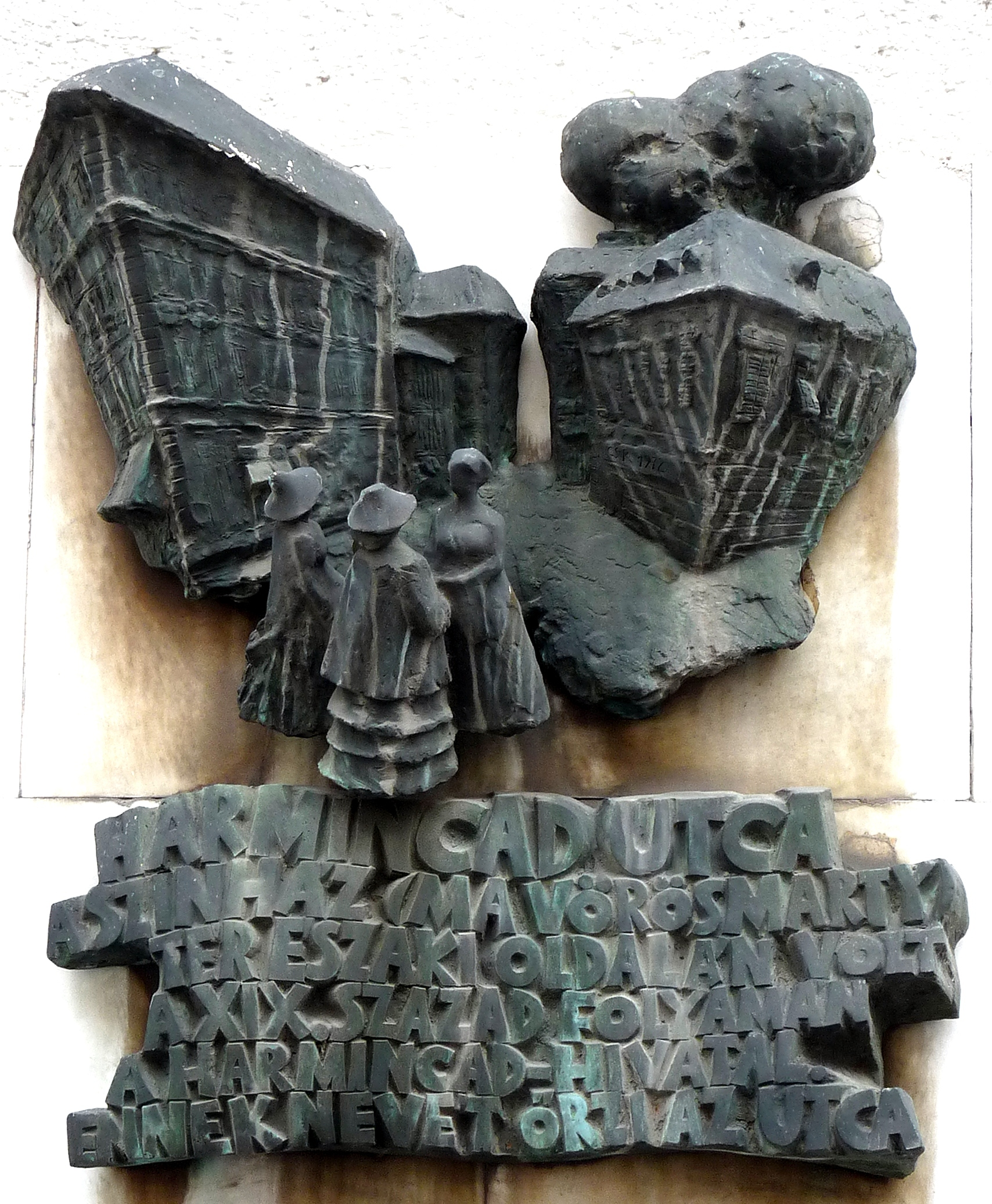
Commemorative plaque to the former Thirtieth Office (tax office), affixed in 1974 at the beginning of the street bearing its name. The author of the bronze relief is Róbert Csíkszentmihályi. (Budapest, District V, Harmincad Street Nr 1).

The thirtieth or thirtieth customs (Hungarian: harmincad, Croatian: tridesetnica, Latin: tricesima) was a tax on foreign trade in the Kingdom of Hungary.

== Origin ==
A charter that Andrew II of Hungary issued for the Benedictine Lébény Abbey in 1208 preserved the earliest reference to the thirtieth. According to the charter, wine and foodstuffs delivered for the monks and their guests were exempt from all tolls and the thirtieth at Győr and on the bridges of the rivers Rába and Rábca. Royal revenue from the thirtieth amounted at 1,500 marks when Andrew II granted it to his daughter, Yolanda in 1235.

According to a scholarly theory, the granting of customs and tolls to ecclesiastic institutions from the late 12th century gave rise to the collection of the thirtieth, because it represented the part of the revenues that the kings preserved for themselves or for their queens.

== Sources ==
- Bán, Péter (1989). "harmincad, harmincadvám [thirtieth, thirtieth customs]". In Bán, Péter (ed.). Magyar történelmi fogalomtár, I. kötet: A-K [Thesaurus of Terms of Hungarian History, Volume I: A–K] (in Hungarian). Gondolat. pp. 177–178. ISBN 963-282-203-X.
- Engel, Pál (2001). The Realm of St Stephen: A History of Medieval Hungary, 895–1526. I.B. Tauris Publishers. ISBN 1-86064-061-3.
- Nagy, Balázs (2011). "Old Interpretations and New Approaches: The 1457-1458 Thirtieth Customs Register of Bratislava". In Zaoral, Roman (ed.). Money and Finance in Central Europe during the Later Middle Ages. Palgarve. pp. 201–217. ISBN 978-1137-46022-6.
- Weisz, Boglárka (2011). "Az Árpád-kori harmincadvám [Thirtieth customs under the Árpáds]". In Cabello, Juan; C. Tóth, Norbert (eds.). Erősségénél fogva várépítésre való: Tanulmányok a 70 éves Németh Péter tiszteletére [It is Very Well Placed for a Castle: Studies for the 70-year-old Péter Németh] (in Hungarian). Szabolcs-Szatmár-Bereg Megyei Önkormányzat Múzeumok Igazgatósága. pp. 267–278. ISBN 978-963-7220-75-3.
