= Panometer =

Panometer or Asisi Panometer may refer to:

- Dresden Panometer
- Leipzig Panometer
