= Hungarian–Ottoman Wars =

Ottoman-Hungary wars, 1366–1526

- Part of the Ottoman wars in Europe
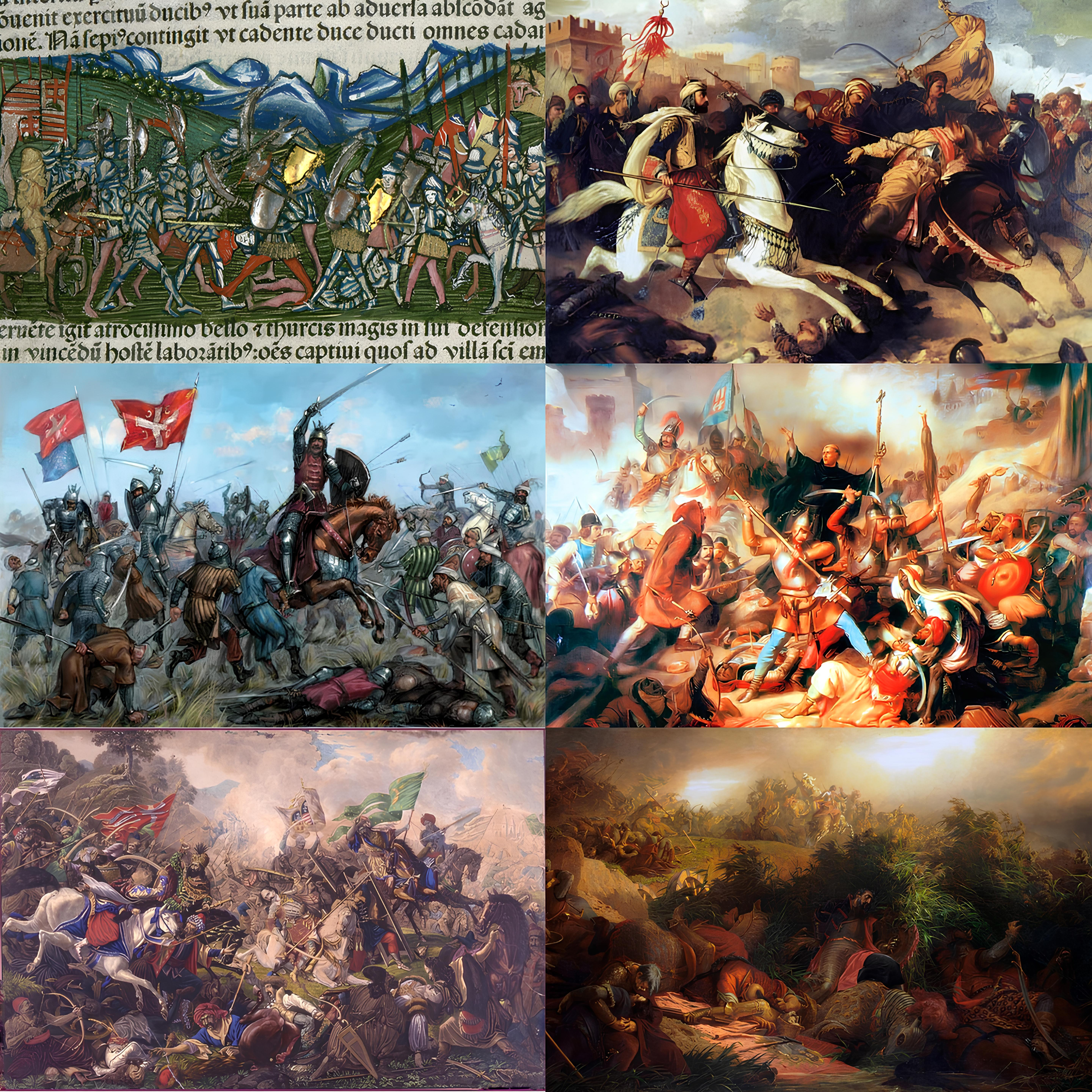
- Clockwise, From top left: The Battle of Hermannstadt, The Battle of Varna, The Battle of Kosovo, The Siege of Belgrade, The Battle of Breadfield, The Battle of Mohács
Date	1366 – 1526
Location	Kingdom of Hungary, Moldavia, Serbian Despotate, Ottoman Empire, Wallachia
Result	Ottoman victory

Belligerents
(Ottoman Empire) Ottoman Empire vassals: Crimean Khanate; Principality of Wallachia; Principality of Moldavia	Kingdom of Hungary; Kingdom of Croatia; Kingdom of Poland; Grand Duchy of Lithuania; Principality of Wallachia; Principality of Moldavia; European allies: Holy Roman Empire; Papal States; Crown of Aragon; Kingdom of Naples; Republic of Venice; Republic of Genoa; Bulgarian Empire; Kingdom of France; Knights of Rhodes; Kingdom of Bosnia; Moravian Serbia; Serbian Despotate; Duchy of Savoy; Teutonic Order; Byzantine Empire; Crown of Castille; Kingdom of Navarre

Commanders and leaders
(Ottoman Empire) Ottoman Army; Serbian Despotate; Voivodes of Wallachia; Voivodes of Moldavia; etc.	Kings of Hungary; Regents of Hungary; Serbian Despotate; Voivodes of Wallachia; Voivodes of Moldavia; etc.

The Hungarian–Ottoman wars (Hungarian: magyar–török háborúk, Turkish: Macaristan-Osmanlı Savaşları) were a series of battles between the Ottoman Empire and the medieval Kingdom of Hungary. Following the Byzantine Civil War, the Ottoman capture of Gallipoli, and the inconclusive Battle of Kosovo in 1389, the Ottoman Empire was poised to conquer the entirety of the Balkans, and eventually came to encompass almost the entirety of present-day Hungary.

Beginning in the 1360's, Hungary was engaged in conflicts with the Ottoman Empire. The Kingdom of Hungary led several crusades, campaigns and carried out several defence battles and sieges against the Ottomans. Hungary bore the brunt of the Ottoman wars in Europe during the 15th century and successfully halted the Ottoman advance. The Ottomans won a significant victory at the Battle of Varna in 1444, but suffered a defeat at the 1456 Siege of Belgrade. One notable figure of this period was Vlad the Impaler, who, with limited Hungarian help, resisted Ottoman rule until the Ottomans placed his brother, Radu the Handsome, on the throne of Wallachia. Ottoman success was once again halted at Moldavia due to Hungarian intervention, but the Turks finally succeeded when Moldavia and then Belgrade fell to Bayezid II and Suleiman the Magnificent, respectively. In 1526 the Ottomans crushed the Hungarian army at the Battle of Mohács, where King Louis II of Hungary and more than 20,000 of his soldiers died.

Following this defeat, the eastern region of the Kingdom of Hungary (the Eastern Hungarian Kingdom and later Principality of Transylvania) became an Ottoman tributary state, constantly engaged in civil war with Royal Hungary. The war continued with the Habsburgs now asserting primacy in the conflict with Suleiman and his successors. The northern and most of the central parts of Hungary managed to remain free from Ottoman rule, but the Kingdom of Hungary, the most powerful state east of Vienna under Matthias I, was now divided and constantly threatened by Ottoman ambitions in the region.

== Background ==
In the century after the death of Osman I in 1326, Ottoman rule began to extend over the eastern Mediterranean and the Balkans, slowly at first and later in earnest. Gallipoli was captured in 1354, severing the Byzantine Empire from its continental territories; the important city of Thessaloniki (with a greater population than London at the time) was captured from the Venetians in 1387, and the Turkish victory at the Battle of Kosovo in 1389 (15 June 1389 in the Julian calendar. 28 June 1389 in the Gregorian calendar) effectively marked the end of Serbian power in the region, paving the way for Ottoman expansion into the rest of Europe.

== Balkans and Turkish wars of Louis I of Hungary ==
In 1344, Louis I of Hungary, who would rule from 1342 to 1382 and earn the epithet "the Great", invaded Wallachia and Moldavia and established a system of vassalage.

Louis and his 80,000 strong army repelled the Serbian Dušan's armies in the duchies of Mačva and principality of Travunia in 1349. When Emperor Dušan broke into Bosnian territory he was defeated by Bosnian Stjepan II with the assistance of Louis' troops, and when Dušan made a second attempt he defeated by Louis in 1354, capturing Mačva and Belgrade. The two monarchs signed a peace agreement in 1355.

His latter campaigns in the Balkans were aimed not so much at conquest and subjugation as at drawing the Serbs, Bosnians, Wallachians and Bulgarians into the fold of the Roman Catholic faith and at forming a united front against the Turks. It was relatively easy to subdue the Balkan Orthodox countries by arms, but to convert them was a different matter. Despite Louis' efforts, the peoples of the Balkans remained faithful to the Eastern Orthodox Church and their attitude toward Hungary remained ambiguous. Louis annexed Moldavia in 1352 and established a vassal principality there, before conquering Vidin in 1365. The rulers of Serbia, Walachia, Moldavia, and Bulgaria became his vassals. They regarded powerful Hungary as a potential menace to their national identity. For this reason, Hungary could never regard the Serbs and Wallachians as reliable allies in subsequent wars against the Turks.

In the spring of 1365, Louis headed a campaign against the Bulgarian Tsardom of Vidin and its ruler Ivan Sratsimir. He seized the city of Vidin on 2 June 1365; the region was under Hungarian rule until 1369.

In 1366 Byzantine Emperor John V visited Hungary to beg for help against the Ottoman Turks, who were in increasing conflict with the Balkan vassal states.

== Crusade of Nicopolis ==
The Battle of Nicopolis (25 September 1396) is thought to be the first military encounter between Hungary and the Ottoman Empire, where a broad coalition force of Christian monarchs and European military commanders including the Knights Hospitaller was comprehensively annihilated by the Ottoman army under the capable command of their 4th Sultan, Bayezid the Thunderbolt .

== Timur and the Ottoman Interregnum ==
Despite these successes the Ottomans were dealt a major setback when at Ankara in 1402 Tamerlane of the Timurid Empire defeated and captured the Ottoman Sultan Bayezid the Thunderbolt (so named for the speed of his crushing victories against his Christian opponents, most notably at Nicopolis). After a decade of internecine battles, Mehmed I emerged victorious and reestablished the Ottoman Empire and Byzantine Emperor accepted its vassalship and agreed to pay tribute.

== Campaigns of Murad II, 1421–1451 ==
By the 1380s Ottomans acquainted firearms as they faced enemies already in possession of firearms like the Byzantines, Venetians and the Hungarians. The earliest type of Turkish hand cannons are called as "Şakaloz", which word came from the Hungarian hand cannon "Szakállas puska" in the 15th century.

Murad II, the successor to Mehmed I, proved to be a worthy successor to his father, who had completed the restoration of their realm following the end of the Ottoman interregnum, and proceeded to conquer new territories both in the balkans and anatolia and adding them to the resurgent Ottoman Empire . In 1422, no longer professing suzerainty to the Byzantines, he laid siege to Constantinople, which narrowly avoided becoming an Ottoman conquest. However he had managed to capture lands surrounding Constantinople.

With Byzantium no longer a threat, Murad II began his war against his Christian opponents, attacking Macedonia and capturing Thessalonika from the Venetians in 1430. Between 1435 and 1436 the Ottomans made a show of strength in Albania, but the country survived due to intervention from the Kingdom of Hungary, whose borders now neared those of the Ottoman Empire.

== Campaigns of John Hunyadi ==
Ottoman Campaigns of John Hunyadi, 1440–1456

In the 1440s and 1450s, the Hungarian military leader John Hunyadi became the key architect of campaigns against the Ottoman Empire. In 1441 he scored a pitched battle victory at Smederevo over Ishak Bey. The following year, he annihilated an Ottoman force invading Transylvania at Sibiu.

In the year of 1442, John Hunyadi won four victories against the Ottomans, two of which were decisive. In March 1442, Hunyadi defeated Mezid Bey and the raiding Ottoman army at the Battle of Szeben in the south part of the Kingdom of Hungary in Transylvania. In September 1442, Hunyadi defeated a large Ottoman army of Beylerbey Şehabeddin, the Provincial Governor of Rumelia. This was the first time that a European army defeated such a large Ottoman force, composed not only of raiders, but of the provincial cavalry led by their own sanjak beys (governors) and accompanied by the formidable janissaries.

Following this victory, Wallachia again accepted the suzerainty of the Kingdom of Hungary. With the help of knights from western Europe, Hunyadi succeeded in capturing Nis on November 3, 1443, defeating another Turkish army as they crossed the Balkan Mountains and then taking another victory on Christmas Day. Because supplies for the Crusader army were low, Hunyadi concluded a ten-year peace treaty with Murad II, presumably on Hunyadi's terms, for it was the triumphant Hungarian that entered Buda in February 1444. Ten years was the maximum time permitted by Islamic law for a treaty with an "infidel". The peace was short lived, as Cardinal Julian Cesarini incited the Hungarians to break the treaty and attack the Turks once more. However, much of the Crusader armies' strength had been reduced due to the loss (by defection) of Serbia, Albania and the Byzantine Empire.

=== Battle of Varna ===
The Crusader army attacked across the Danube. Murad, upon hearing of the Christian breach of the treaty, is said to have mounted the broken treaty on his standard and said the words, "Christ, if you are God as your followers claim, punish them for their perfidy". The two armies met on November 10, 1444, near Varna in eastern Bulgaria. Accounts vary as to how many troops were present but the Crusaders may have been 30,000 strong whilst the Ottoman forces were two to three times larger. Nonetheless, Hunyadi's successful defense wagons held the line until King Ladislas led a charge to his death against the Turkish lines. His head was mounted on a spear where all the defeated Crusaders could see it. Few Crusaders survived the battle, although Hunyadi did escape with his life.

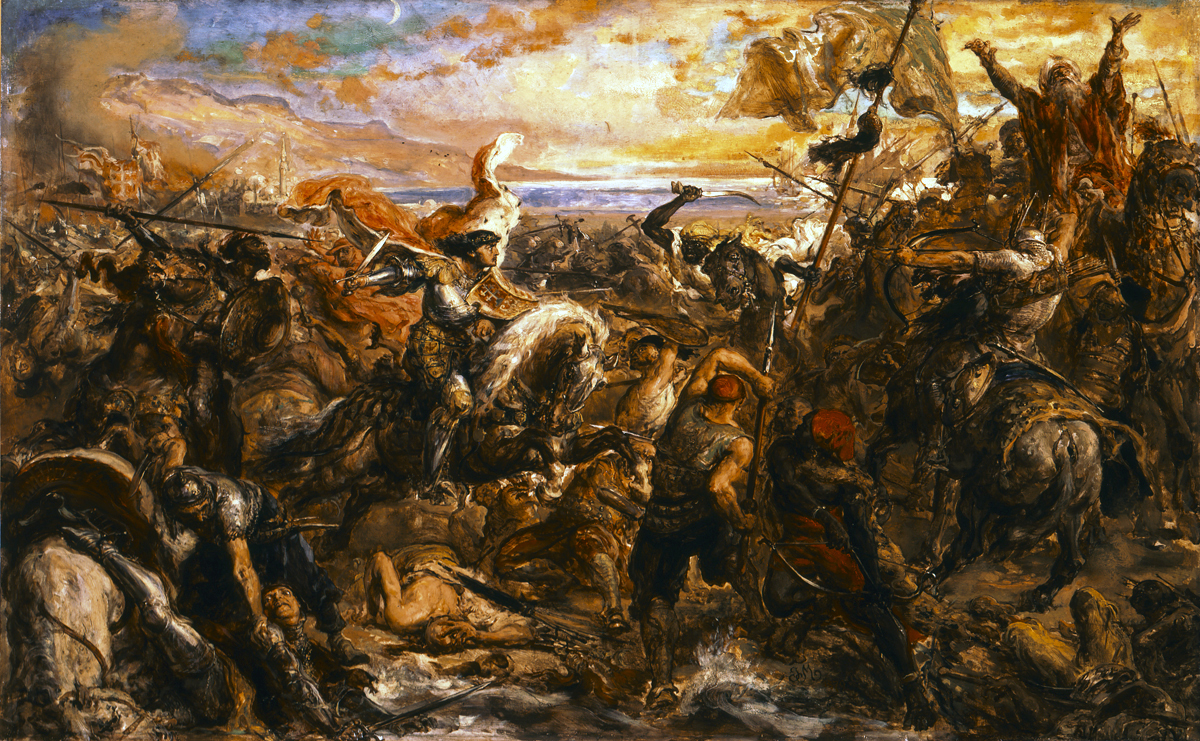
Battle of Varna

=== After Varna ===
The Hungarians recovered their strength after Varna and Hunyadi was able to lead another expedition down the Danube. Turkish counter-attacks saw this "crusade" driven back. After Murad dealt with the Greeks at the Peloponesse and others who had fought him at Varna, he turned his attention to Albania, whose leader, once an Ottoman hostage, was now a popular resistance leader. Hunyadi could not refuse an offer to fight the Turks and in 1448 an army of some 24,000 Hungarians marched south into Serbia. At the Second Battle of Kosovo Murad scored another victory against the Hungarians. This time, Hunyadi had had enough and was unable to campaign against the Ottoman Sultan. Murad II passed on his powers to his successor, Mehmed II. Thanks to such victories, the Ottoman forces were able to capture Constantinople in 1453 with only the Italians offering minimal support to the Byzantines.

=== Siege of Belgrade (1456) ===
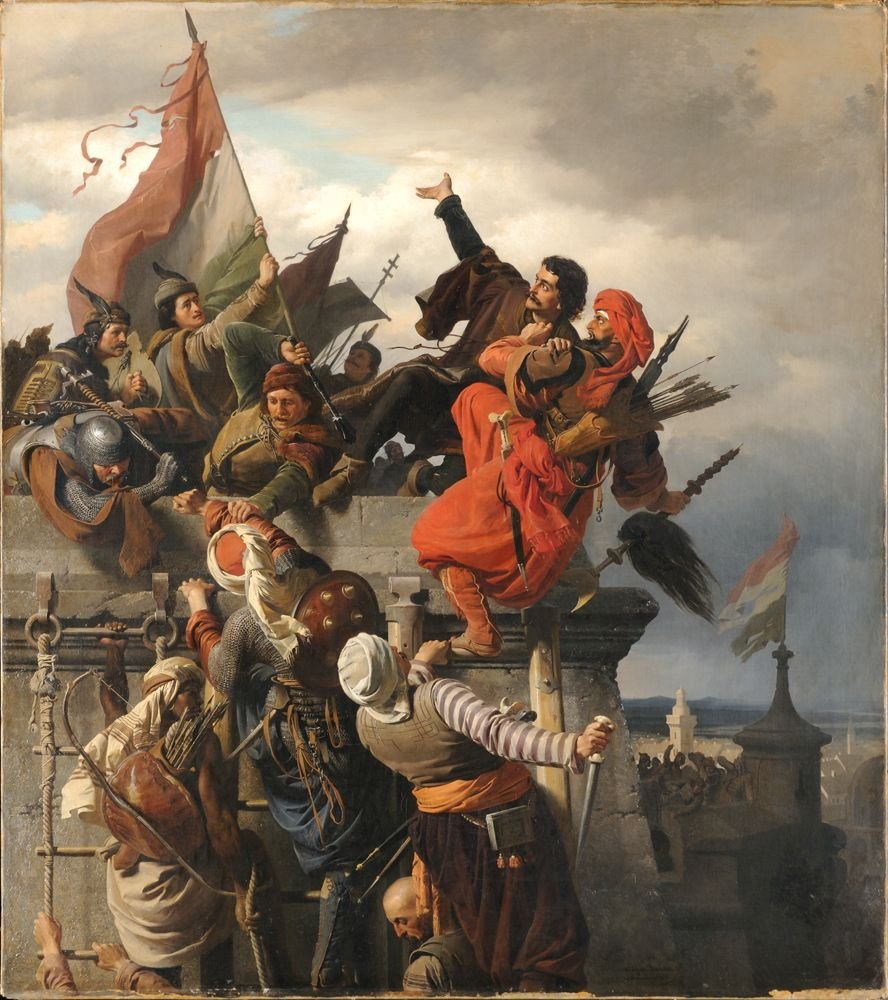
The Self- Sacrifice of Titusz Dugovics, Alexander von Wagner (1859)

Meanwhile, the Ottoman issue had again become acute, and, after the fall of Constantinople in 1453, Sultan Mehmed II was rallying his resources to subjugate Hungary. His immediate objective was Nándorfehérvár (today Belgrade). Nándorfehérvár was a major castle-fortress, and a gatekeeper of south Hungary. The fall of this stronghold would have opened a clear way to the heart of Central Europe. Hunyadi arrived at the Siege of Belgrade at the end of 1455, after settling differences with his domestic enemies. At his own expense, he restocked the supplies and arms of the fortress, leaving a strong garrison there under the command of his brother-in-law Mihály Szilágyi and his own eldest son Hunyadi László. He proceeded to form a relief army, and assembled a fleet of two hundred ships. His main ally was the Franciscan friar, Giovanni da Capistrano, whose fiery oratory drew a large crusade made up mostly of peasants. Although relatively ill-armed (most were armed with farm equipment, such as scythes and pitchforks) they flocked to Hunyadi and his small corps of seasoned mercenaries and cavalry.

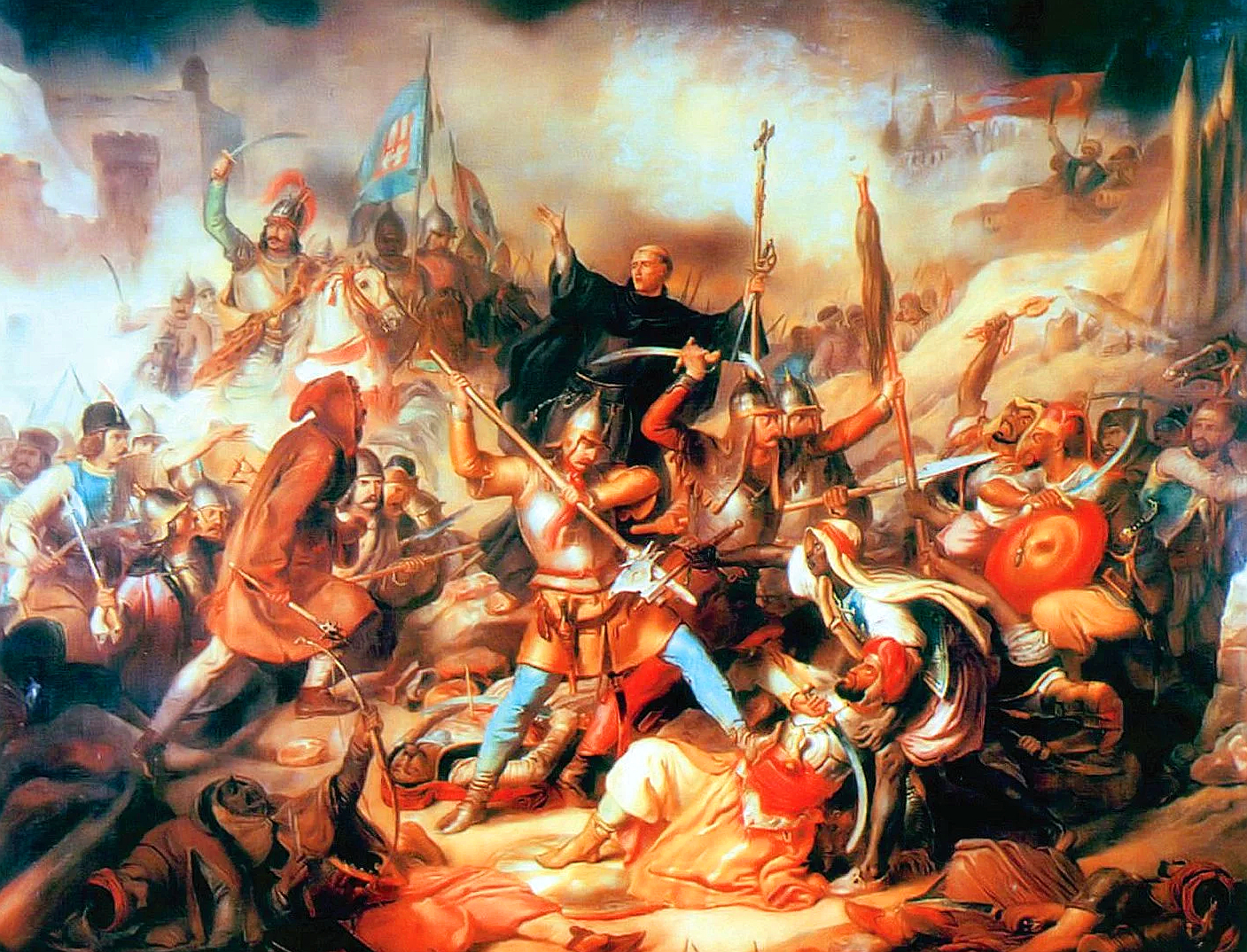
Battle of Nándorfehérvár, Hungarian painting from the 19th century. In the middle Kapisztrán János with the cross in his hand.

On July 14, 1456, the flotilla assembled by Hunyadi destroyed the Ottoman fleet. On July 21, Szilágyi's forces in the fortress repulsed a fierce assault by the Rumelian army, and Hunyadi pursued the retreating forces into their camp, taking advantage of the Turkish army's confused flight from the city. After fierce but brief fighting, the camp was captured, and Mehmet raised the siege and returned to Constantinople. With his flight began a 70-year period of relative peace on Hungary's southeastern border.

However, plague broke out in Hunyadi's camp three weeks after the lifting of the siege, and he died on August 11. He was buried inside the (Roman Catholic) Cathedral of Alba Iulia (Gyulafehérvár), next to his younger brother John. Sultan Mehmet II paid him tribute: "Although he was my enemy I feel grief over his death, because the world has never seen such a man."

During the battle, Pope Callixtus III had ordered the bells of every European church to be rung every day at noon, as a call for believers to pray for the defenders of Belgrade. However, in many countries (like England and the Spanish kingdoms), news of the victory arrived before the order, and the ringing of the church bells at noon thus transformed into a commemoration of the victory. The pope never withdrew the order, and many Catholic and older Protestant churches still ring the noon bell to this day.

== Turkish wars of Matthias Corvinus (1458–1490) ==
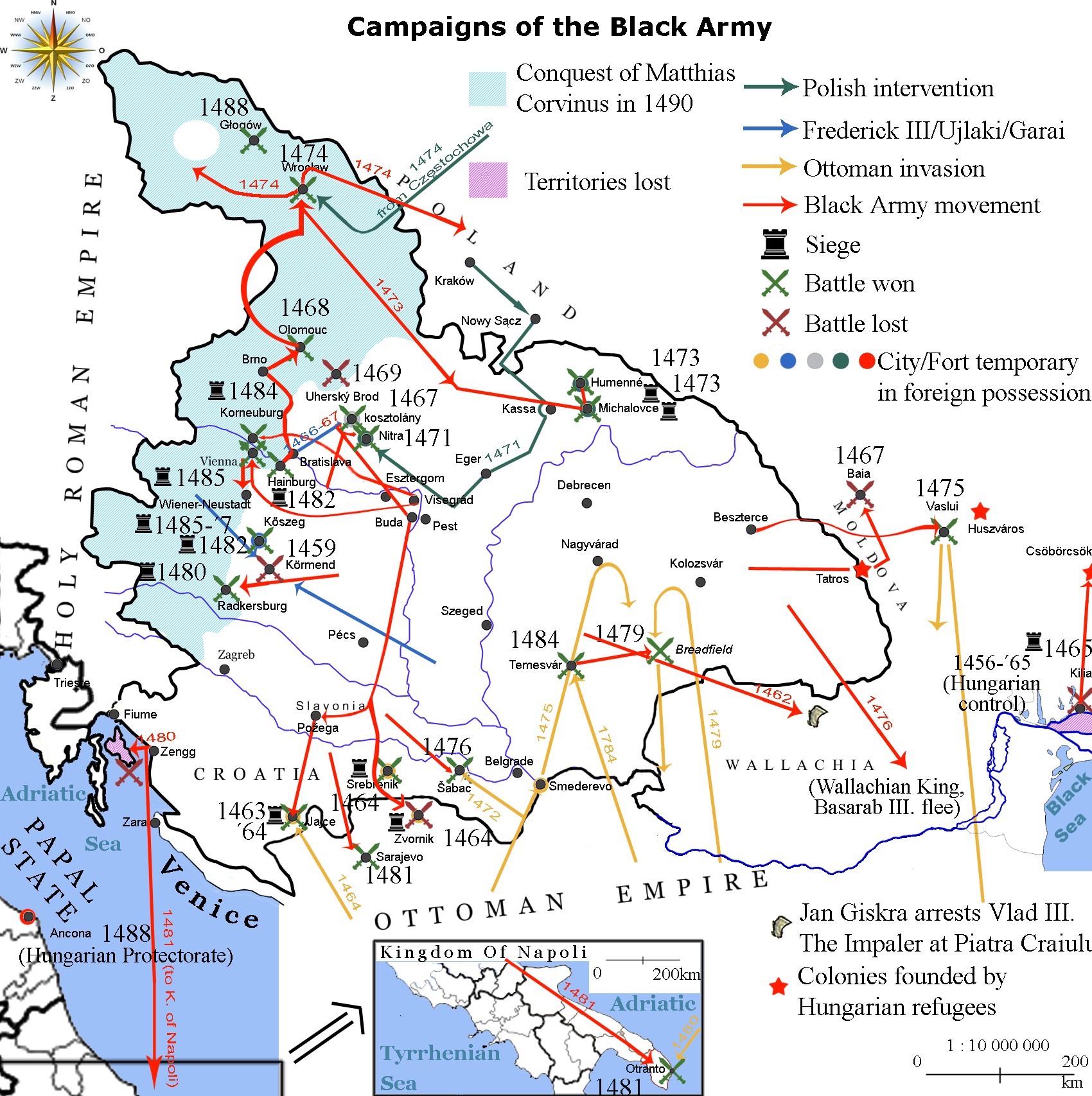
Military actions of Matthias Corvinus and the Black Army

Hunyadi's son Matthias Corvinus was crowned king in Buda in 1458 at the age of 15. In 1471 Matthias renewed the Serbian Despotate in south Hungary under Vuk Grgurević for the protection of the borders against the Ottomans. In 1479 an Ottoman army, on its return home from ravaging Transylvania, was annihilated at Szászváros (modern Orăştie, 13 October 1479) in the Battle of Breadfield. The following year Matthias recaptured Jajce, drove the Ottomans from northern Serbia and instituted two new military banats, Jajce and Srebernik, from reconquered Bosnian territory. In 1480 an Ottoman fleet seized Otranto in the Kingdom of Naples. At the earnest solicitation of the pope Matthias sent the Hungarian general, Magyar Balázs, to recover the fortress, which surrendered on 10 May 1481. Again in 1488, Matthias took Ancona under his protection for a while, occupying it with a Hungarian garrison.

== Wallachian and Moldavian wars ==
=== Vlad the Impaler and war with Wallachia, 1456–1475 ===
Mehmed II's post-Constantinople troubles escalated further when the principality of Wallachia under Count Vlad III Dracul rebelled against the Ottoman Empire and declared the King of Hungary as his suzerain. The main drive for these actions was Vlad's return to his homeland after being in exile as a hostage of the Ottoman sultan. In 1461, five years after his return, Vlad initiated war with the Turks when he impaled the Turkish ambassadors demanding tribute from him and took the fortress of Giurgiu. Vlad then began a bloody assault across the Danube to the Black Sea, destroying as many of the ports as he could to prevent Ottoman naval attacks.

Ottoman attempts to subdue Vlad militarily proved a failure, but his cruelty, which had terrorized his enemies, proved to be his undoing. When Mehmed offered the populace the choice of Vlad or his brother Radu, the populace chose Radu and soon Vlad was again an exile on the run. An attempt to return a few years afterwards ended in his death in battle.

=== Stephen the Great and war against Moldavia, 1475–1476 ===
Mehmed's army seems to have spent itself in Wallachia for the campaign against the Moldavians was shorter and yielded poorer results. In 1475 Mehmed ordered an invasion of Moldavia. Again, the Ottomans often took possession of the field but Moldavian hit-and-run tactics proved effective against the Turks. Poor roads further slowed the Ottomans until Stephen the Great was able to concentrate his forces at Vaslui. An Ottoman offensive was held in check and then finally driven from the field on 10 January 1475.

The Ottomans returned in 1476, this time assisted by their allies from Crimea, the Tartars and their newly conquered Vassal of Wallachia. Stephen knew that he did not have the resources to defend his people and evacuated them to the mountains. After a failed attack on the Ottoman vanguard Stephen seemed on the brink of defeat when King Matthias Corvinus of Hungary offered assistance. The Ottomans withdrew when the Hungarians began moving in and fighting did not resume until 1484.

== Bayezid II, 1481–1512 ==
The early reign of Bayezid II included a small civil war against his brother Jem, who escaped to the west. There European leaders entertained ideas of installing a pro-Western sultan while sending a crusade to the Balkans. Consequently, Bayezid did not incite any serious wars with his Christian opponents until his brother's death in 1495. In the meantime Bayezid signed a ten-year peace with Hungary in 1484, although this did not prevent a defeat of an Ottoman army at Villach in 1493. Between 1484 and 1486 Bayezid campaigned annually against Moldavia in an attempt to subdue it and link up with Crimea, his Muslim vassal and ally. Despite two defeats in 1485 and 1486 Moldavia was subjugated. As Bayezid's reign drew to a close he was entangled in a civil war between his sons Ahmed and Selim. Eventually Selim took the throne in 1512 and for the next eight years continued minor conquests in the west, although his main achievement was the conquest of the Mamluke Sultanate. It would be Selim's successor, Suleiman who would continue the war against Hungary.

== Campaigns of Suleiman the Magnificent, 1520–1566 ==
Suleiman the Magnificent resumed the war against Hungary by attacking the city of Belgrade, the same settlement that had defied Mehmed II over half a century earlier. Despite strong resistance, the city fell to Suleiman. In 1522 Suleiman took his army to a strategically successful siege of Rhodes, allowing the Knights Hospital to evacuate for the fort.

=== Battle of Mohács ===
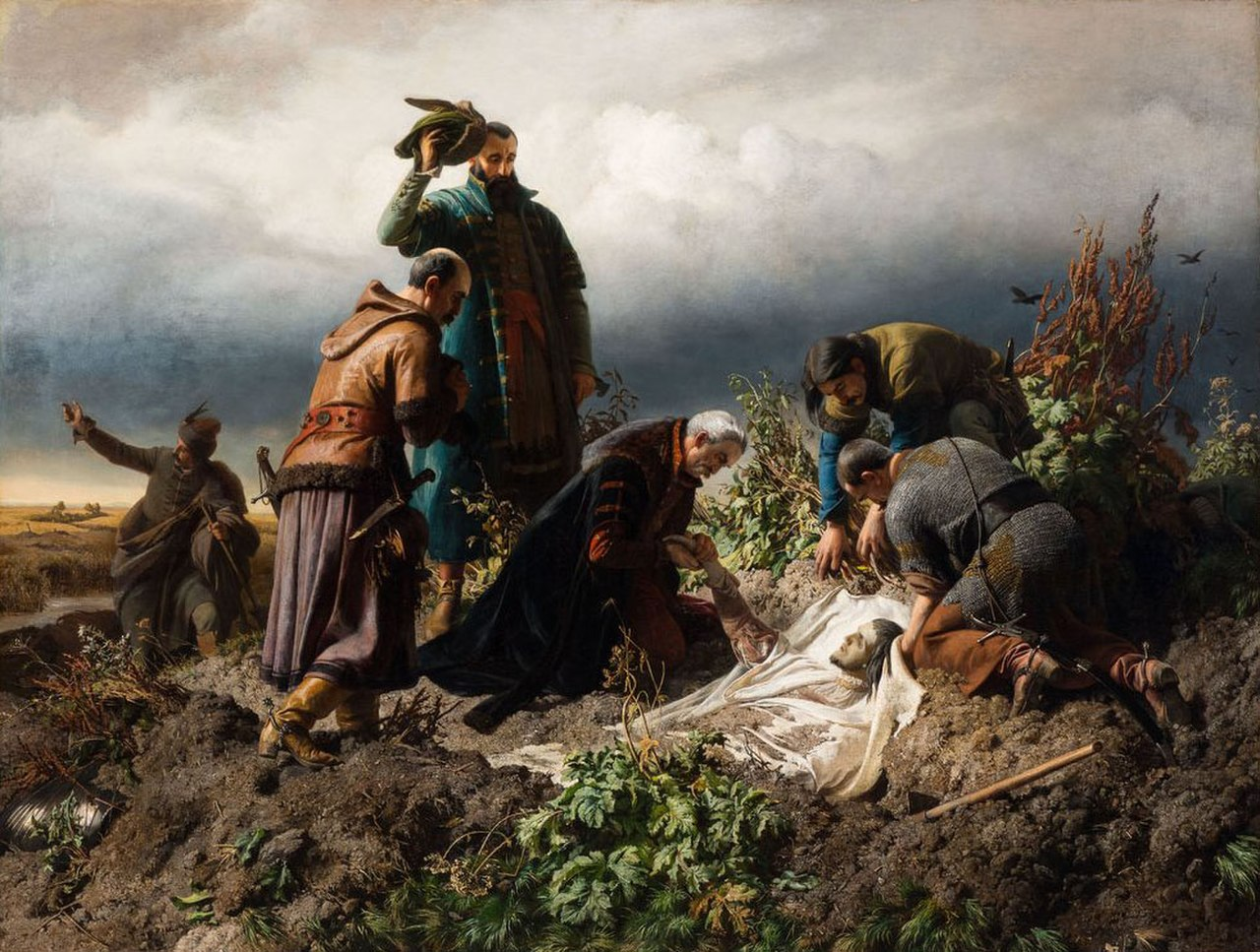
Discovery of the Corpse of King Louis II

When Suleiman launched an invasion in 1526 the Grand Vizier constructed a great bridge ahead of the Sultan allowing his army to march into Hungary. Despite eighty days of marching and taking five days to cross the Danube River, the Ottomans met no resistance from the Hungarians. The original plan of Hungarian King Louis II had been to send a vanguard to hold the Danube where the Ottomans were expected to cross, yet the nobles of the Kingdom refused to follow the King's deputy in battle, claiming that they did so out of zealous allegiance to the King (and would therefore only follow him). Consequently, when King Louis II took the field his army of 36,000 men seemed to be doomed to fail against the Ottomans' 80,000. At Mohács the plains of Hungary allowed the heavier Christian knights to launch an effective charge. As the Hungarian knights brushed aside first the Akinjis and then the Sipahis, the Ottoman cavalry regrouped and flanked the Knights inflicting a moderate number of casualties. The Sultan then placed his Janissaries and cannon into position chained up as an effective line. The Hungarian cavalry took serious casualties from the skilfully handled Turkish artillery. With the cavalry annihilated, the infantry suffered immense casualties as the weight of numbers of the Ottomans and their skill in battle took their toll. When Suleiman the Magnificent found the body of Louis II he is said to have been saddened by his untimely death.

=== Aftermath of Mohács ===
John Zápolya, who had been instructed by Louis II to raid the enemy's supply lines, arrived at the battle too late and fled the scene. Suleiman, however, was not ready to annex the Kingdom completely into the Ottoman realm and in that power gap, Zapolya was chosen by Hungarian electorate as their ruler. Meanwhile, at the Diet of Bratislava Archduke Ferdinand of Austria was declared King of Hungary. The surviving nobles of Hungary now had to choose between pledging allegiance to a native vassal of Suleiman and a Christian "foreigner".

=== After Zapolya's death ===
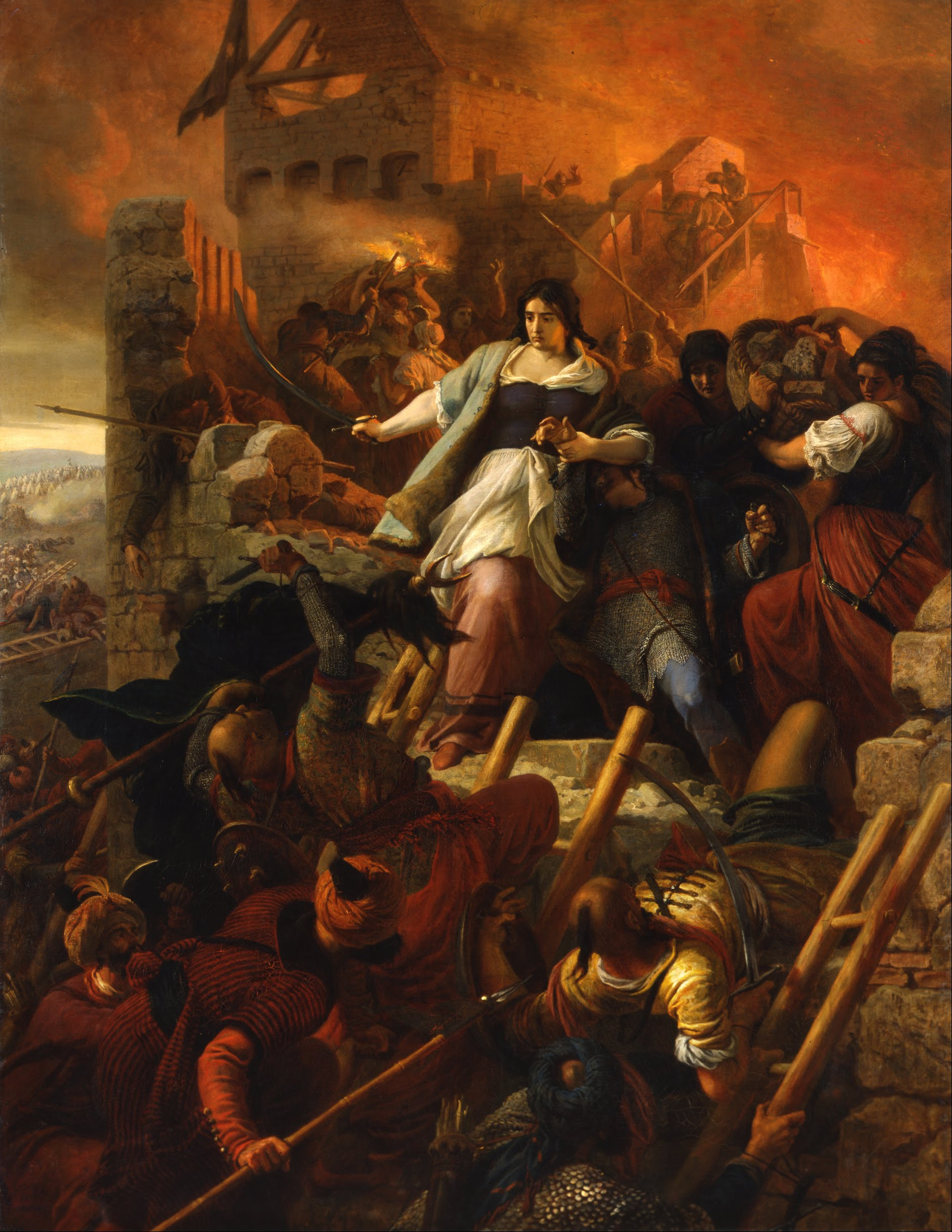
The Women of Eger

Zápolya would rule Hungary until his death in 1540. Following his demise, Hungary was split into three parts. The north-west (present-day Slovakia, western Transdanubia and Burgenland, western Croatia and parts of north-eastern present-day Hungary) remained under Habsburg rule; although initially independent, later it became a part of the Habsburg Monarchy under the informal name Royal Hungary. The Habsburg Emperors would from then on be also crowned as Kings of Hungary.

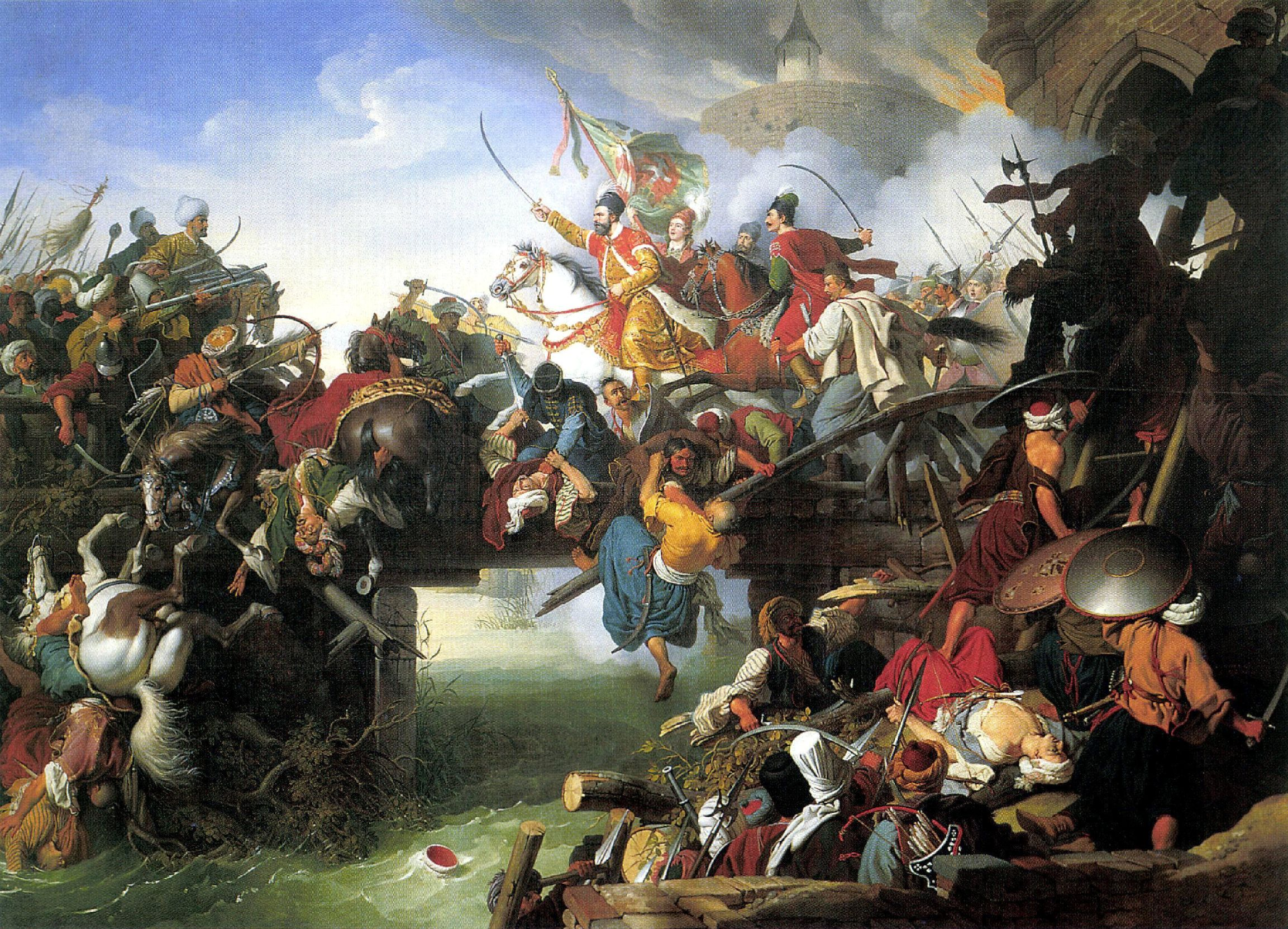
Nikola Šubić Zrinski's Charge from the Fortress of Szigetvár

The eastern part of the kingdom (Partium and Transylvania) became at first an independent principality, but gradually was brought under Turkish rule as a vassal state of the Ottoman Empire. The remaining central area (most of present-day Hungary), including the capital of Buda, became a province of the Ottoman Empire. The siege of Buda, part of the Little War in Hungary, was one of the most important Ottoman victories over the Habsburg forces in Hungary.

In 1552, Suleiman's forces laid siege of Eger, located in the northern part of the Kingdom of Hungary, but the defenders led by István Dobó repelled the attacks and defended the Eger Castle.

== Sources ==
- Ćirković, Sima (2004). The Serbs. Malden: Blackwell Publishing. ISBN 9781405142915.
- Jefferson, John (2012). The Holy Wars of King Wladislas and Sultan Murad: The Ottoman-Christian Conflict from 1438–1444. Leiden: Brill Publishers. ISBN 978-90-04-21904-5.
- Housley, Norman (1992). The Later Crusades, 1274–1580: From Lyons to Alcazar. Oxford: Oxford University Press.
- Housley, Norman (2002). Religious Warfare in Europe 1400-1536. Oxford: Oxford University Press.
- Housley, Norman (2012). Crusading and the Ottoman Threat, 1453–1505. Oxford: Oxford University Press.
