= Titusz Dugovics =

Hungarian soldier

Titusz Dugovics Dugovics Titusz
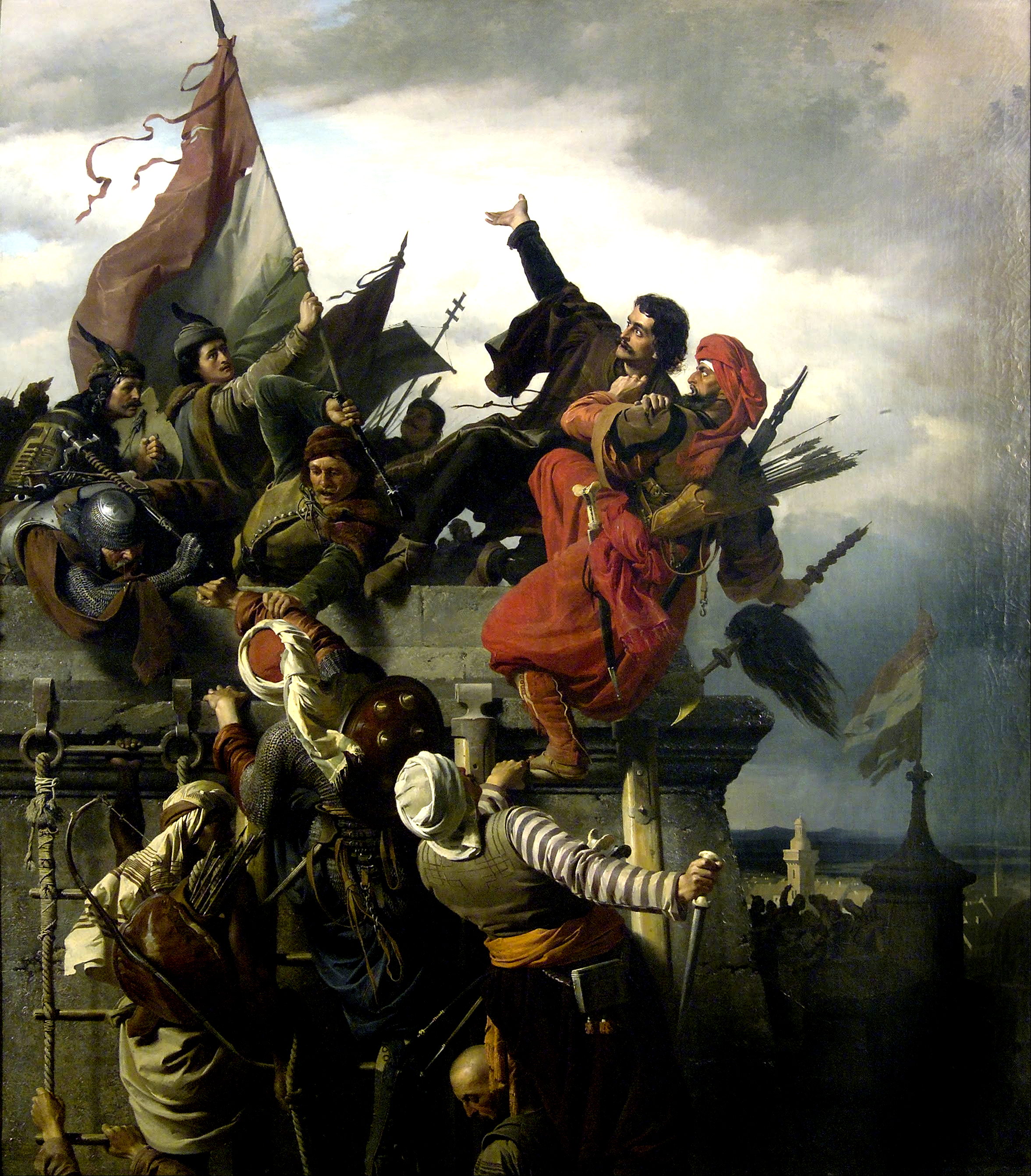
- Sándor Wagner: The Self-Sacrifice of Titusz Dugovics
- Born: Unknown
- Died: 21 July 1456; Siege of Belgrade
- Cause of death: Self-sacrifice
- Other name: Titus Dugović
- Relatives: János Hunyadi

„Since he could not stop them from pinning their banner on the tower, he enclasped the Turk, and jumped from the height into the depth, dragging the Turk down with himself”.

— ─ Antonio Bonfini

Titusz Dugovics or Titus Dugović (Hungarian: Dugovics Titusz; died in 21 July 1456) was the alleged identity of an unknown Hungarian soldier who was stationed during the Siege of Belgrade (known by its historical name Nándorfehérvár in Hungary) by the Ottoman Empire's forces in Belgrade. Dugovics dragged down the Turk who was about to plant their tug on Belgrade's castle, at the cost of his life, thus preventing the Turkish besiegers from taking the castle.

The figure of Titusz Dugovics has become one of the best known symbols of heroic self-sacrifice and patriotism in today's Hungarian historical tradition. In a narrower sense, it is a symbol of self-sacrificing heroism of all the Christians who defended their country and Christianity from the Turkish attack, as well as the self-sacrificing soldiers who defended Belgrade against a huge army of soldiers. The legend was based on the military and historical significance of the victory in Belgrade, which stopped the further expansion of the Turks in Europe for about 70 years.

Dugovics's act was first mentioned in the writings of Italian writer Antonio Bonfini, without any name given to the hero, and was not mentioned in Hungary's history until the 18th century.

However, the historical truth of Dugovics's identity is in some doubt, because all known records that describe him are of highly questionable veracity.

== The siege ==
Nándorfehérvár (Belgrade) was at this time under the command of John Hunyadi. From 4 to 22 July 1456, Nándorfehérvár was besieged by the Sultan Mehmed II. After ongoing, fierce battles, Ottoman troops attacked the city walls on 21 July, and a Janissary succeeded, according to legend, to climb a turret and momentarily hoist the Ottoman banner. It was immediately overthrown by soldiers in the same moment that Dugovics grabbed the bearer. As a result, both Dugovics and the standard-bearer plunged from the walls to their deaths.

This heroic act was significant in the repulse of the Ottomans and honours the memory of the defenders of Nándorfehérvár.

== Authenticity ==
In his study, historian Tibor Szőcs claims Titusz Dugovics did not exist. A familiar figure in Hungarian history, Dugovics is the embodiment of anti-Ottoman resistance and self-sacrifice. This heroic deed by him has served as the subject of numerous works of literature and art since the middle of the 19th century, and several streets in Hungary have been named after him.

Nevertheless, an analysis of the available sources proves that the story cannot be considered as historically accurate. The heroic act was first documented in Antonio Bonfini's chronicle written at the end of the 15th century, where an anonymous Hungarian fighter is mentioned. The same story is told by both Bonfini and the Serbian Konstantin Mihailović, in relation to the Siege of Jajce in 1464, featuring an unnamed soldier as well. Early modern-era Czech historical literature by Jan Dubravius also refers to the hero of Belgrade/Nándorfehérvár as being unknown, but defining his nationality as Czech.

From the end of the 18th century, with the forming of Hungarian national consciousness, the valiant soldier had been regarded as a national hero and role model. Imre Dugovics, a member of the Western Hungarian noble family of Croatian origin, took advantage of that. In 1821, by means of three false documents, he attempted to verify that the anonymous fighter had been an ancestor of his family, called Titusz Dugovics. The name was made known to the public by Gábor Döbrentei, a recognised scholar of the period, who had been deceived by the false documents, and published them in study. Thus, Titusz Dugovics and his story soon became (and have ever since remained) a part of Hungarian historical consciousness, although his name should not be considered more than early-19th-century fiction. The only element of the story that may be accepted as authentic is that of the unknown soldier described by Bonfini and Konstantin.

== Bibliography ==
- Szőcs, Tibor: Egy "legendás" hős: Dugovics Titusz története. Hadtörténelmi Közlemények, 2009. p. 3–35.
- Döbrentei, Gábor: Dugovics Titus, ki magát, csakhogy nemzete győzzön, halálra szánta. 1824.
- Nagy, Iván: Magyarország családai címerekkel és nemzedékrendi táblázatokkal. Pest, 1858.
- Balogh, Gyula: Vasmegye nemes családjai. Szombathely, 1894.
- Kempelen, Béla: Magyar nemes családok. Budapest, 1912.
- Porkoláb, István: Celldömölk Kismáriacell szabadalmas mezőváros története. Celldömölk, 1927.
- Dömötör, Sándor: Dugovics Titusz hősi halálának 500. évfordulóján. Dugovics Titusz vasi kapcsolatai. Vasmegye, 1956. 171. sz. (júl. 21.) p. 4.
- Nádasdy, Lajos: Legenda vagy valóság Dugovics Titusz nagysimonyi származása? Új Kemenesalja, 1994. május 26. p. 5.
