= Siege of Belgrade (1456) =

Battle during the Ottoman-Hungarian Wars

Siege of Belgrade (Nándorfehérvár)
- Part of the Ottoman wars in Europe; Hungarian–Ottoman Wars
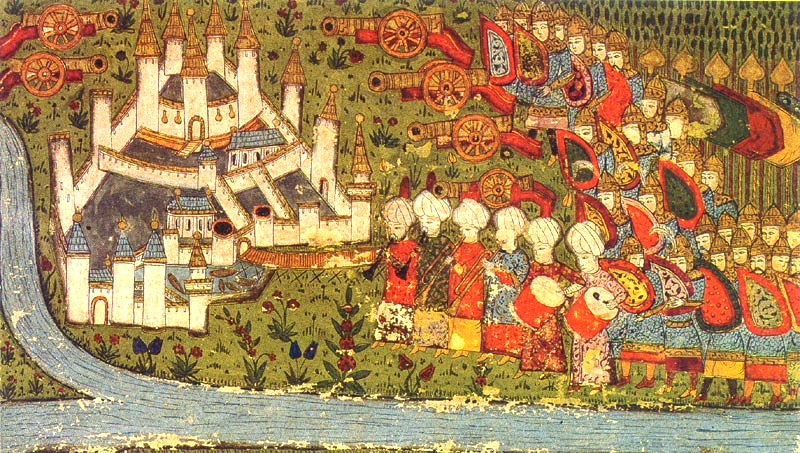
- Ottoman miniature of the siege of Belgrade, 1456
Date	4–22 July 1456
Location	Nándorfehérvár, (1427–1521) in Kingdom of Hungary (present-day Belgrade, Serbia)
Result	Hungarian victory

Belligerents
Kingdom of Hungary; Serbian Despotate	Ottoman Empire

Commanders and leaders
John Hunyadi; Michael Szilágyi; John of Capistrano; John Kórógyi	Mehmed II (WIA); Zagan Pasha; Mahmud Pasha; Karaca Pasha †

Strength
7,000 Castle defenders of Michael Szilágyi; 10,000–12,000 Professional army of John Hunyadi (mostly cavalry); A motley army about 30,000–60,000 recruited Crusaders (with only some professional units); 200 boats (only 1 galley); 40 boats from the city Artillery	30,000; 60,000; higher estimates of 100,000 (Note: According to Pálosfalvi, the Ottoman army at the siege numbered 40,000–50,000 men); 21–200 vessels 300 cannons (22 large ones), 7 siege engines (2 mortars)

Casualties and losses
4,000 men or <10,000	13,000 (Note: Other estimates: 4,000–5,000 (Babinger) 75,000 (possibly exaggerated) (Tucker)); 3 large galleys sunk, 24 vessels captured (4 large, 20 smaller); 300 cannons

The siege of Belgrade, or the siege of Nándorfehérvár (Hungarian: Nándorfehérvár ostroma or nándorfehérvári diadal, lit. "Triumph of Nándorfehérvár"; Serbian Cyrillic: Опсада Београда, romanized: Opsada Beograda) was a military blockade of Belgrade that occurred 4–22 July 1456 in the aftermath of the fall of Constantinople in 1453 marking the Ottomans' attempts to expand further into Europe. Led by Sultan Mehmed II, the Ottoman forces sought to capture the strategic city of Belgrade (Hungarian: Nándorfehérvár), which was then under Hungarian control and was crucial for maintaining control over the Danube River and the Balkans.

As the "key to the realm", the castle of Belgrade was the largest and most fortified border stronghold of Hungary, regarded as the southern gate of the kingdom and being considered one of the strongest fortresses in Europe. Captain in Chief of Hungary, John Hunyadi, had garrisoned and strengthened the fortress city at his own expense. The Hungarian defenders, led by Michael Szilágyi, put up a determined resistance against the larger Ottoman army from 4 July. The siege lasted for several weeks, during which both sides suffered heavy losses. The defenders used innovative tactics, including heavy artillery and firearms, to repel the Ottoman assaults. On 14 July, Hunyadi's relief force destroyed a Turkish flotilla on the Danube, and Hunyadi entered to the fortress with fresh troops. The Ottomans launched a major assault on 21 July, but it was repulsed. Wounded Mehmed II was compelled to lift the siege and retreat on 22 July. This victory boosted the morale of European Christian forces and was seen as a turning point in their efforts, as it provided a crucial buffer and temporarily halted Ottoman expansion towards Europe beyond the Balkans for 70 years.

John Hunyadi's successful defence of Belgrade earned him widespread acclaim and respect as a military leader, though he died of the plague a few weeks later. The Ottomans would continue their expansion in other directions, and the struggle between the Ottoman Empire and European powers persisted for centuries. The battle's significance also extended beyond its immediate aftermath, as it demonstrated the importance of firearms and artillery in warfare, heralding a new era in military technology and tactics.

== Background ==
Anti-Ottoman campaigns of John Hunyadi, 1440–1456

The Ottoman Empire, under the leadership of Sultan Mehmed II, had recently achieved a significant victory by capturing Constantinople in 1453, making it the new capital of the Ottoman Empire, thereby ending the Byzantine Empire. The Ottomans became more ambitious in their expansionist aims, seeking to extend their influence further into Europe. They considered Belgrade, a strategically positioned fortress city at the confluence of the Danube and Sava river, as a crucial gateway for their advance northward. The Ottoman Empire's expansionist ambitions posed a significant challenge to the stability and security of European states, leading to a united effort to resist further Ottoman encroachment. In 1452 former gubernátor John Hunyadi surrendered the regency to King Ladislas V, who came of age, and became Count of Besztercze and captain general of Hungary.

== Prelude ==
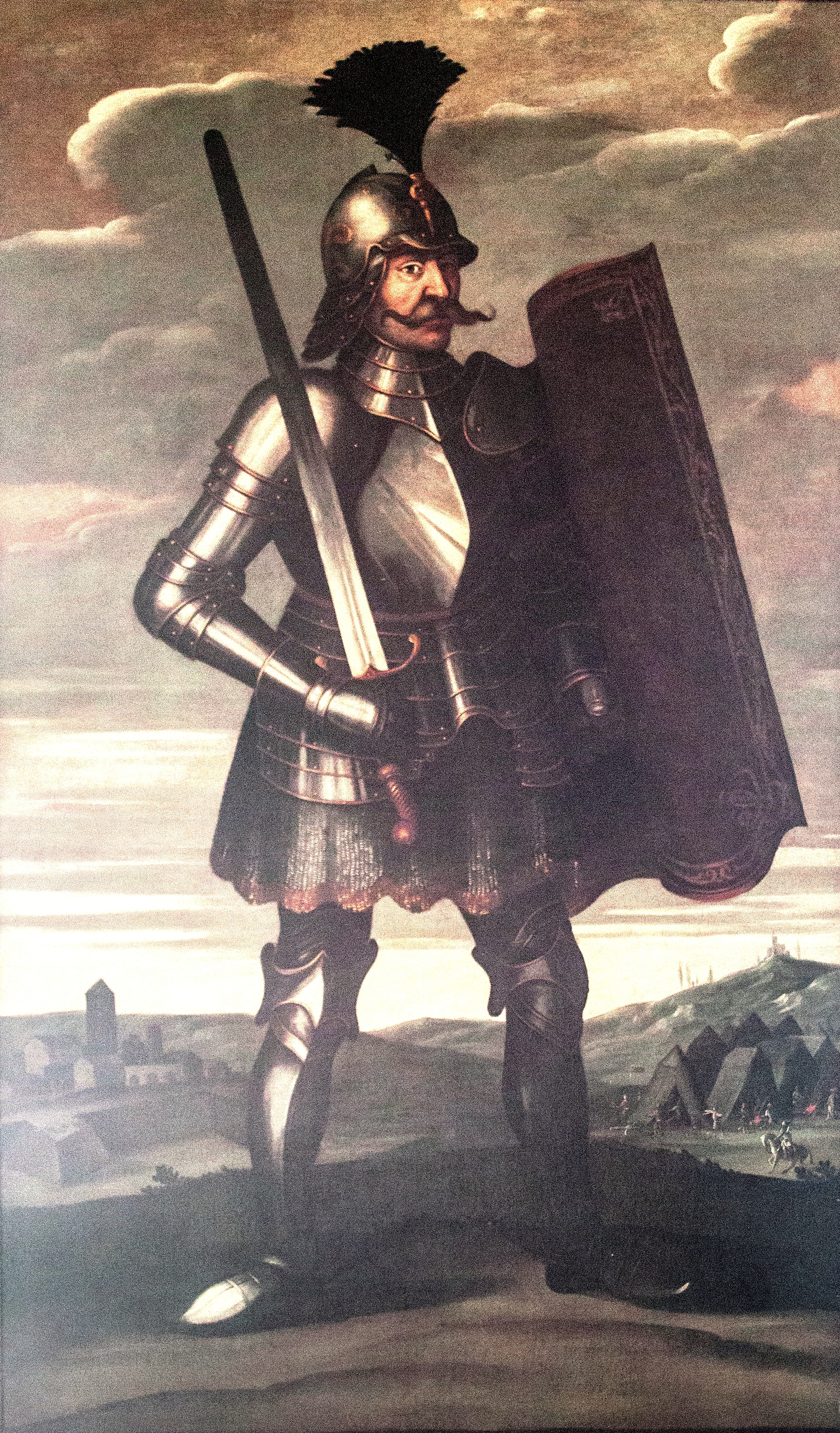
John Hunyadi, Regent-Governor of the Kingdom of Hungary (1446–1453), Captain in Chief of the Kingdom of Hungary (1453–1456)

After conducting two campaigns against the Serbian Despotate in 1454 and 1455, Sultan Mehmed decided to continue his conquests towards the northwest by capturing the strategically important city of Belgrade from the Kingdom of Hungary. Significant preparations were made by the Ottoman sultan for the conquest of the city, including the casting of 22 large cannons alongside many smaller ones and the establishment of a navy that would sail up the Danube to assist the army during the siege. At the end of 1455, after receiving reports of the imminent Ottoman attack, Hunyadi began preparations of his own for the fortification of the Danube, informing the papal legate that he was ready to contribute, at his own expenses, 7,000 men in the fight against the Ottomans and asking for military assistance. Hunyadi then armed the Belgrade fortress with 5,000 mercenaries that he placed under the command of his brother-in-law Mihály Szilágyi and his own eldest son László. Belgrade inhabitants came to help transporting the war machines. Hunyadi then proceeded to form a relief army of 12,000. In April 1456 general mobilisation was decreed following a Diet between the king and the noblemen.

An Italian Franciscan friar allied to Hunyadi, Giovanni da Capistrano, sent as an inquisitor to Hungary to eliminate or convert so-called heretics, (non-Catholics) started preaching a crusade to attract peasants and local countryside landlords to join the defence of Europe. The crusaders numbering about 25,000 included an inexperienced peasant force of about 18,000 some of them carrying only clubs and slings. The recruits came under Hunyadi's banner, the core of which consisted of smaller bands of seasoned mercenaries and a few groups of minor knights. All in all, Hunyadi managed to build a force of 25–30,000 men.

As the Ottoman army neared Belgrade, it passed through Sofia and proceeded towards the Danube, traversing the valley of Morava. On 18 of June, it encountered a Serbian Army of approximately 9,000 soldiers, dispatched to halt the Ottoman progress. The smaller Serbian forces were utterly devastated and defeated by the advancing Ottoman troops; towards the end of the month the Ottomans appeared near Belgrade.

== Siege ==
=== Preparation ===
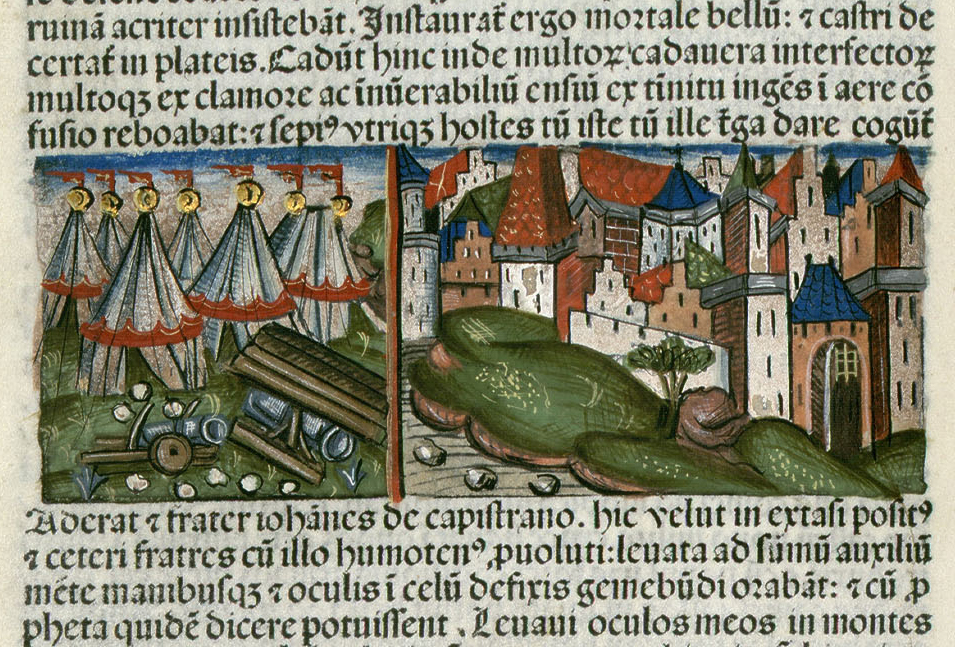
The Siege of Belgrade (Chronica Hungarorum, 1488)

Before Hunyadi could assemble his forces, the Ottoman troops from the army of Mehmed II (160,000 men in early accounts, 60–70,000 according to newer research) started appearing near Belgrade in the last days of June.

Szilágyi could rely on a force of only 5,000–7,000 men in the castle. Mehmed set up his siege on the neck of the headland and started heavily bombarding the city's walls on July 4. He arrayed his men in three sections: The Rumelian corps had the majority of his 300 cannons, while his fleet of 200 river war vessels had the rest of them. The Rumelians were arrayed on the right wing and the Anatolian corps were arrayed on the left. In the middle were the personal guards of the Sultan, the Janissaries, and his command post. The Anatolian corps and the Janissaries were both heavy infantry troops. Mehmed posted his river vessels mainly to the northwest of the city to patrol the marshes and ensure that the fortress was not reinforced. They also kept an eye on the Sava river to the southwest to avoid the infantry from being outflanked by Hunyadi's army. The zone from the Danube eastwards was guarded by the Sipahi, the Sultan's feudal heavy cavalry corps, to avoid being outflanked on the right.

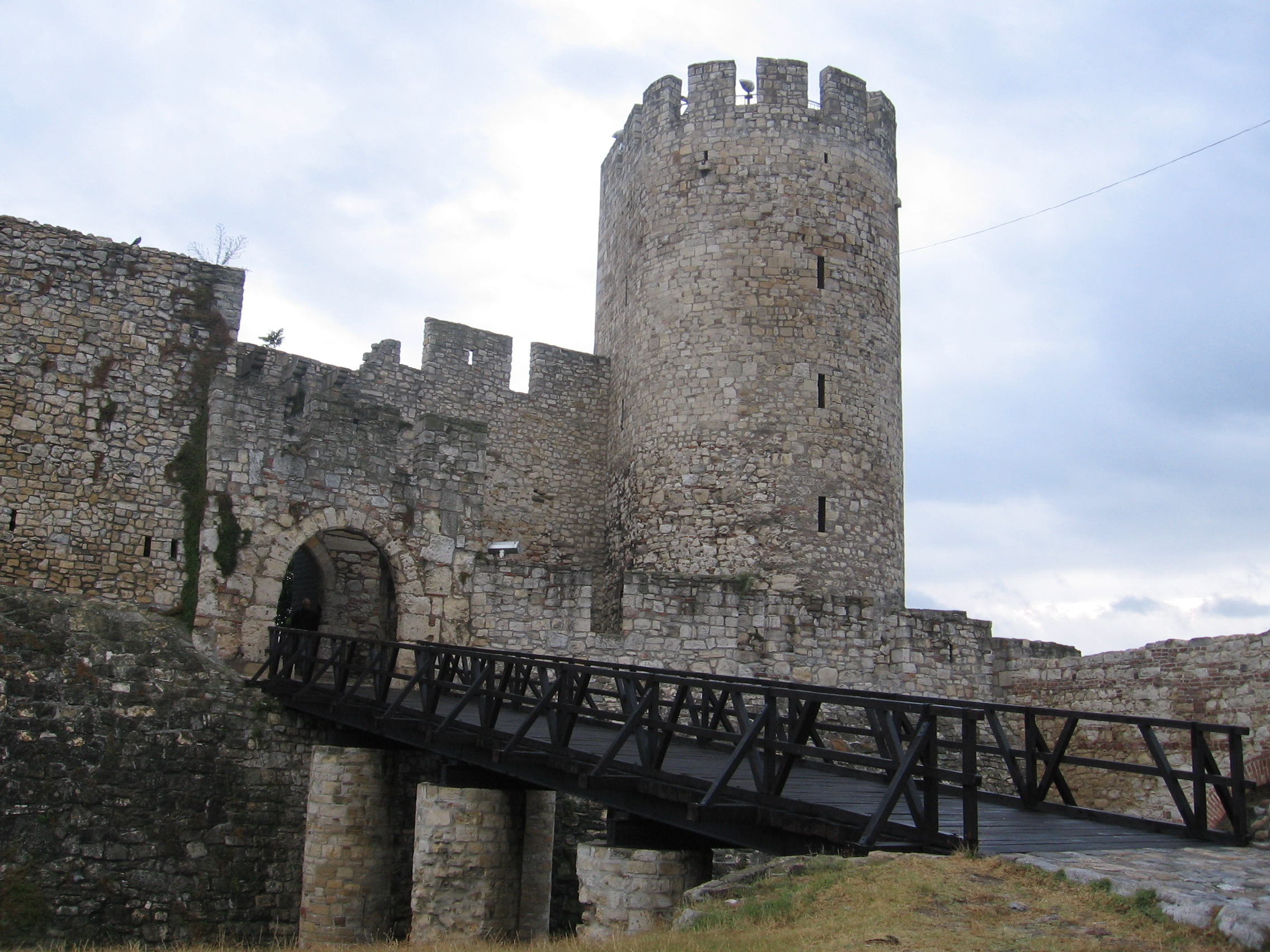
Part of Belgrade Fortress from the 17th century

When Hunyadi was informed of this, he was in the south of Hungary recruiting additional light cavalry troops for the army, with which he would intend to lift the siege. Although relatively few, his fellow nobles were willing to provide manpower, and the peasants were more than willing to do so. Capistrano, the Friar sent to Hungary by the Vatican both to find heretics and to preach a crusade against the Ottomans, managed to raise a large, albeit poorly trained and equipped, peasant army, with which he advanced towards Belgrade. Capistrano and Hunyadi travelled together though commanding the army separately. Both of them had gathered around 40,000–50,000 troops altogether. Once reports of the assembled relief army approaching reached the Ottoman camp, Mehmed held a war council with his generals to determine his army's next actions. Karaca Pasha recommended that a part of Ottoman army should cross the Danube to counter the approaching relief force. This proposal was rejected by the council, particularly due to opposition by the Rumelian begs. Instead, the decision was made to prioritize capturing the city from its besieged defenders, a move seen as a tactical blunder by modern historians, as it allowed Hunyadi to set up camp across the river uncontested.

The outnumbered defenders relied mainly on the strength of the formidable castle of Belgrade, which was at the time one of the best engineered in the Balkans. Belgrade had been designated as the capital of the Serbian Despotate by Stefan Lazarević 53 years prior, in 1403–1404, and remained in Serbian hands until 1427, when it was returned to Hungarian king Sigismund. The fortress was located on a hill and designed in an elaborate form with three lines of defence: the inner castle with the palace, a huge upper town with the main military camps, four gates and a double wall, as well as the lower town with the cathedral in the urban centre and a port at the Danube. This building endeavour was one of the most elaborate military architecture achievements of the Middle Ages as it also benefitted from the natural obstacle of the rivers being at the junction of the Danube and the Sava. On 2 July Capistrano arrived at Belgrade.

=== Naval battle ===
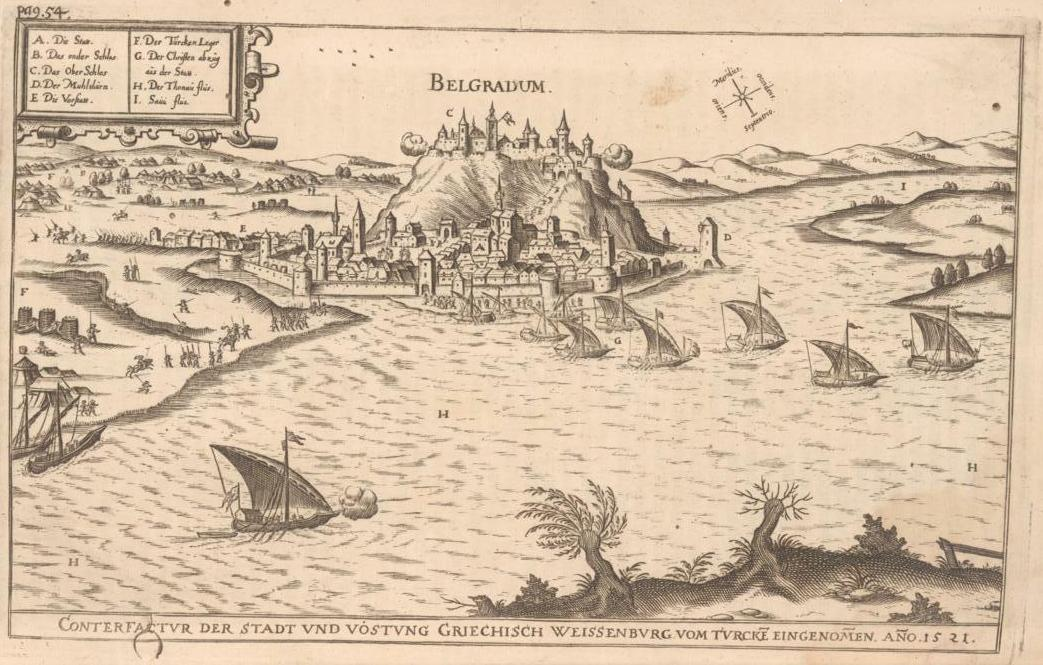
Fortress of Belgrade as it looked in the Middle Ages. The lower and upper town with the palace are visible.

Hunyadi established his camp in the vicinity of the Zemun fortress, while the Ottoman fleet encircled Belgrade along the Danube to put a stop to the provisioning of the city. Hunyadi's primary objective was to secure the river passage to support and supply the besieged garrison. To achieve this, he commanded the assembly of all ships on the Danube and communicated with Szilágyi, instructing him to be prepared to launch an attack on the Ottoman fleet from a strategic position. Szilágyi readied around forty vessels, crewed by Serbians from the city. The Ottoman Naval Flotilla facing them, depending on the source, was made up of 21 to as much as 200 vessels.

On July 14, 1456, after 5 hours of battle on the river, Hunyadi broke the naval blockade sinking three large Ottoman galleys and capturing four large vessels and 20 smaller ones. By destroying the Sultan's fleet, Hunyadi was able to transport his troops and much-needed food into the city. The fort's defenders were also reinforced.

=== Ottoman assault ===
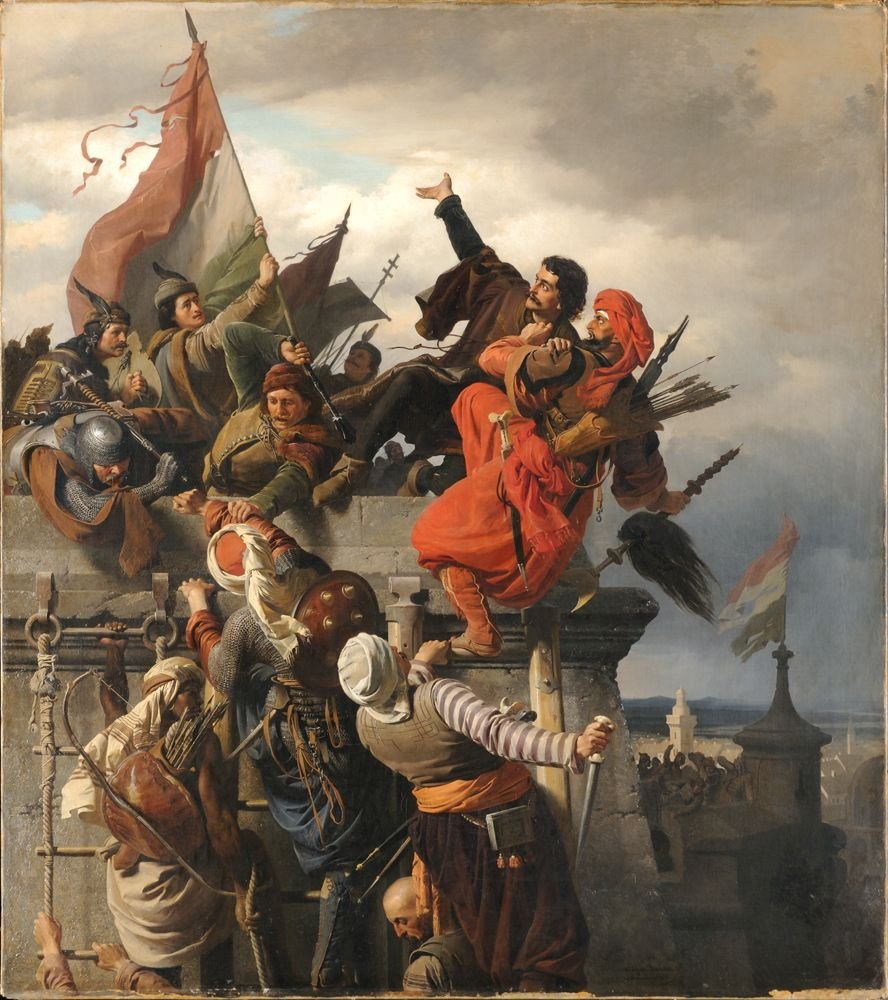
Sandor Wagner's The Self Sacrifice of Titusz Dugovics (1859) (a mythical Hungarian soldier who made a heroic act of self-sacrifice during the siege)

Infuriated by the failure on the Danube, Mehmed ordered his cannoneers to continuously fire upon the city walls, in preparation for a final offensive to take the city. The defenders responded with fire of their own, managing to kill Karaca Pasha with a cannonball. In the build-up to the general assault, the Ottomans launched small attacks each day, which were forcefully rejected. The continuous bombardment resulted in several breaches opening on the walls of the fortress. On July 21 Mehmed launched an all-out assault that began at sundown and continued all night. The besieging army flooded the city and then started its assault on the fort. As this was the most crucial moment of the siege, Hunyadi ordered the defenders to throw tarred wood and other flammable material, and then set it afire. Soon a wall of flames separated the Janissaries fighting in the city from their fellow soldiers trying to breach through the gaps into the upper town. The battle between the encircled Janissaries and Szilágyi's soldiers inside the upper town was turning in favour of the Christians, and the Hungarians managed to beat off the fierce assault from outside the walls. The Janissaries remaining inside the city were thus massacred while the Ottoman troops trying to breach the upper town suffered heavy losses.

=== Final battle ===
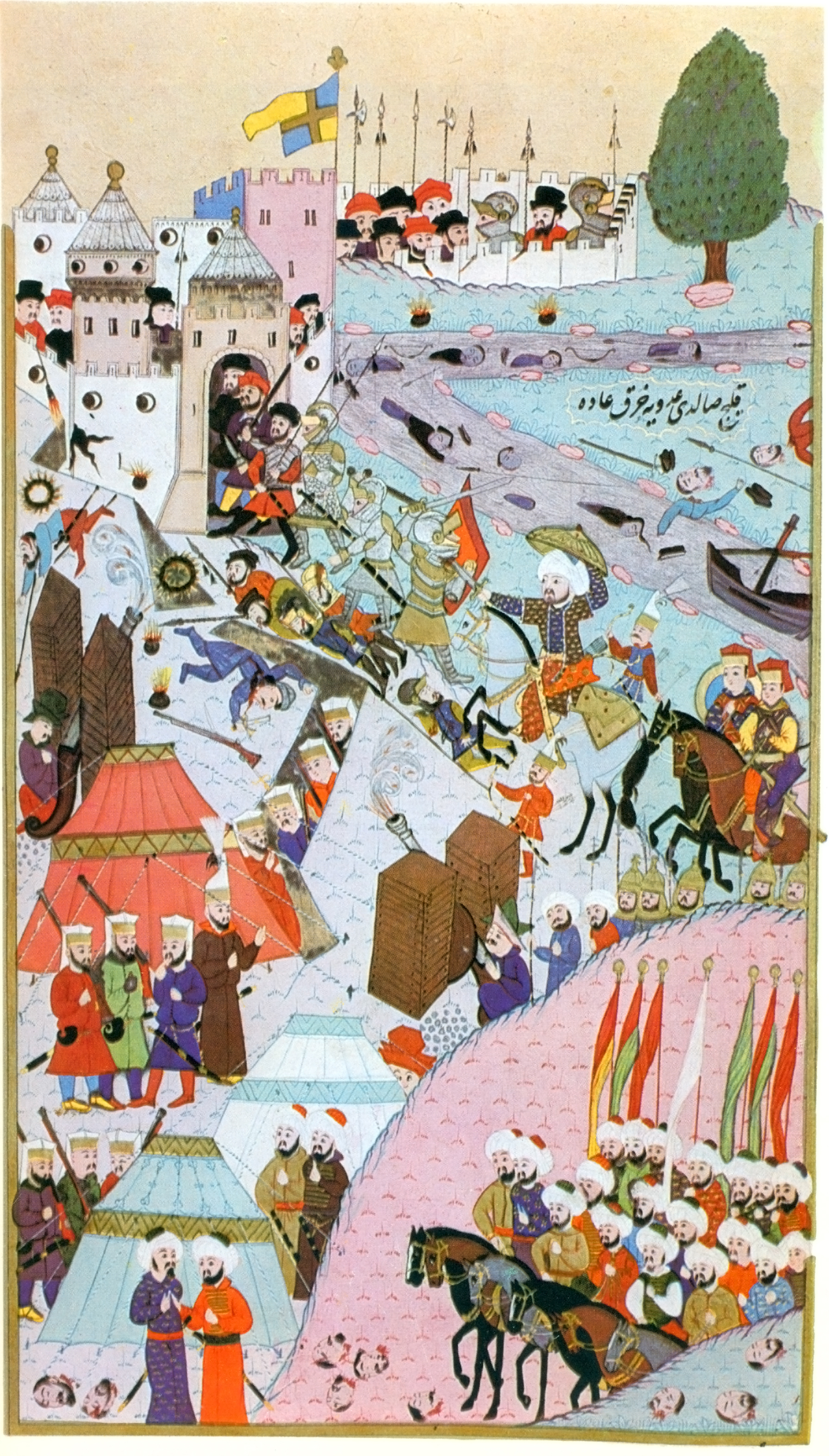
Siege of Belgrade (in Hungarian: Nándorfehérvár) 1456. Hünername 1584

The next day, by some accounts, the peasant crusaders started a spontaneous action, and forced Capistrano and Hunyadi to make use of the situation. Despite Hunyadi's orders to the defenders not to try to loot the Ottoman positions, some of the units crept out from demolished ramparts, took up positions across from the Ottoman line, and began harassing enemy soldiers. Ottoman Sipahis tried without success to disperse the harassing force. At once, more defenders joined those outside the wall. What began as an isolated incident quickly escalated into a full-scale battle.

John of Capistrano at first tried to order his men back inside the walls, but soon found himself surrounded by about 2,000 peasant levymen. He then began leading them toward the Ottoman lines, crying, "The Lord who made the beginning will take care of the finish!" Capistrano led his crusaders to the Ottoman rear across the Sava river. At the same time, Hunyadi started a desperate charge out of the fort to capture the cannons in the Ottoman encampment.

The Christian counter offensive managed to gain significant ground against the Ottoman troops, eventually reaching as far as the Ottoman camp and capturing their artillery. At this crucial point of the battle, one of the viziers advised Mehmed to abandon the camp for his safety, which he refused to do so on the grounds that it would be a “sign of cowardice”. After this, Mehmed personally joined the fighting, accompanied by two of his begs. The Sultan managed to personally kill a number of enemy soldiers (Note: Three per Tursun Beg, one per Laonikos Chalkokondyles) before being injured, forcing him to abandon the battlefield. The news of their Sultan fighting alongside them caused a morale boost amongst the Ottoman army, which allowed them to go on the offensive again and push the Christian forces out of the Ottoman camp. The actions of the Sultan and the arrival of reinforcements had prevented a complete rout of the Ottoman army; however, the army had been far too weakened to continue the siege, and repeated Ottoman attempts at recapturing their cannons resulted in failure. This led the Ottoman war council to decide on ending the siege. During the night of July 22 to 23, the Ottomans buried their dead according to their customs, loaded their wounded in a long row of wagons, and evacuated the camp in a hurry, heading southeast. The Christian forces weren't able to pursue after them. The following day the crusader army entered the now abandoned Ottoman camp, finding immense loot left behind by the retreating Ottoman army.

== Aftermath ==
It is claimed that after the defeat, while he and his army were retreating into Bulgaria, the failure as well as the ensuing loss of no less than 24,000 of his best soldiers angered Mehmed in such a manner that, in an uncontrollable fit of fury, he wounded a number of his generals with his own sword, before ordering their executions.

However, the Hungarians paid dearly for this victory. Plague broke out in the camp, from which John Hunyadi himself died three weeks later in Zimony, Hungary (later Zemun, Serbia) on 11 August 1456. He was buried in the Cathedral of Gyulafehérvár (now Alba Iulia), the capital of Transylvania.

As the design of the fortress had proved its merits during the siege, some additional reinforcements were made by the Hungarians. The weaker eastern walls, where the Ottomans broke through into the upper town were reinforced by the Zindan Gate and the heavy Nebojša Tower. This was the last of the great modifications to the fortress until 1521, when Mehmed's great-grandson Suleiman eventually captured it.

== Noon bell ==
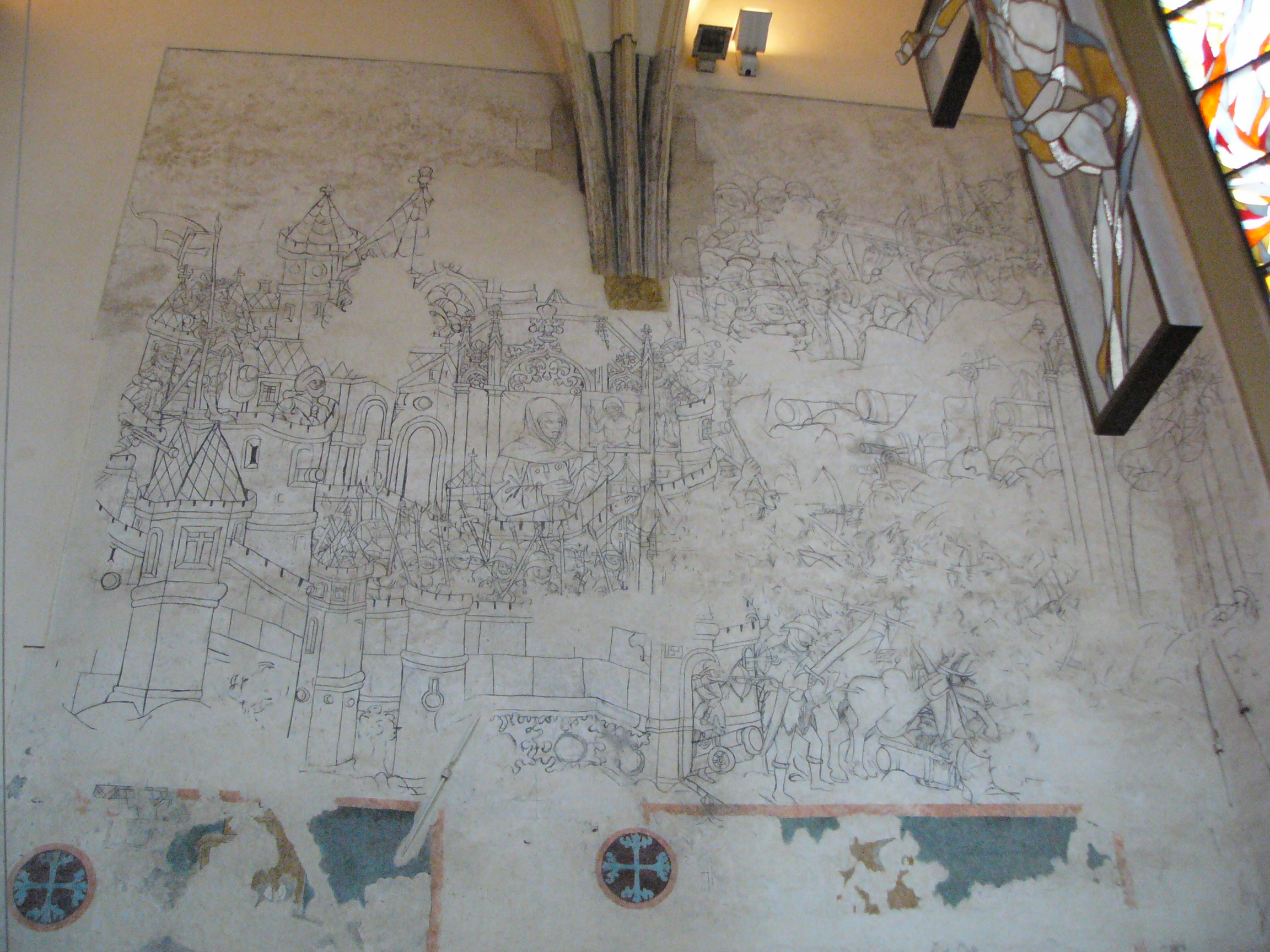
Gothic fresco of the siege of Belgrade from 1468, in a church in Olomouc (Czech Republic). Probably the oldest depiction of the battle; shows Giovanni da Capistrano and John Hunyadi.

Pope Callixtus III ordered the bells of every European church to be rung every day at noon, as a call for believers to pray for the defenders of the city. The practice of the noon bell is traditionally attributed to the international commemoration of the victory at Belgrade and to the order of Pope Callixtus III, since in many countries (like England and the Spanish kingdoms) news of the victory arrived before the order, and the ringing of the church bells at noon was thus transformed into a commemoration of the victory. The Pope did not withdraw the order, and Catholic and the older Protestant churches still ring the noon bell to this day.

As he had previously ordered all Catholic kingdoms to pray for the victory of the defenders of Belgrade, the Pope celebrated the victory by making an enactment to commemorate the day. This led to the legend that the noon bell ritual undertaken in Catholic and old Protestant churches, enacted by the Pope before the battle, was founded to commemorate the victory. The day of the victory, July 22, has been a memorial day in Hungary ever since.

This custom still exists also among Protestant and Orthodox congregations. In the history of the University of Oxford, the victory was welcomed with the ringing of bells and great celebrations in England. Hunyadi sent a special courier, Erasmus Fullar, among others to Oxford with the news of the victory.

== Legacy ==
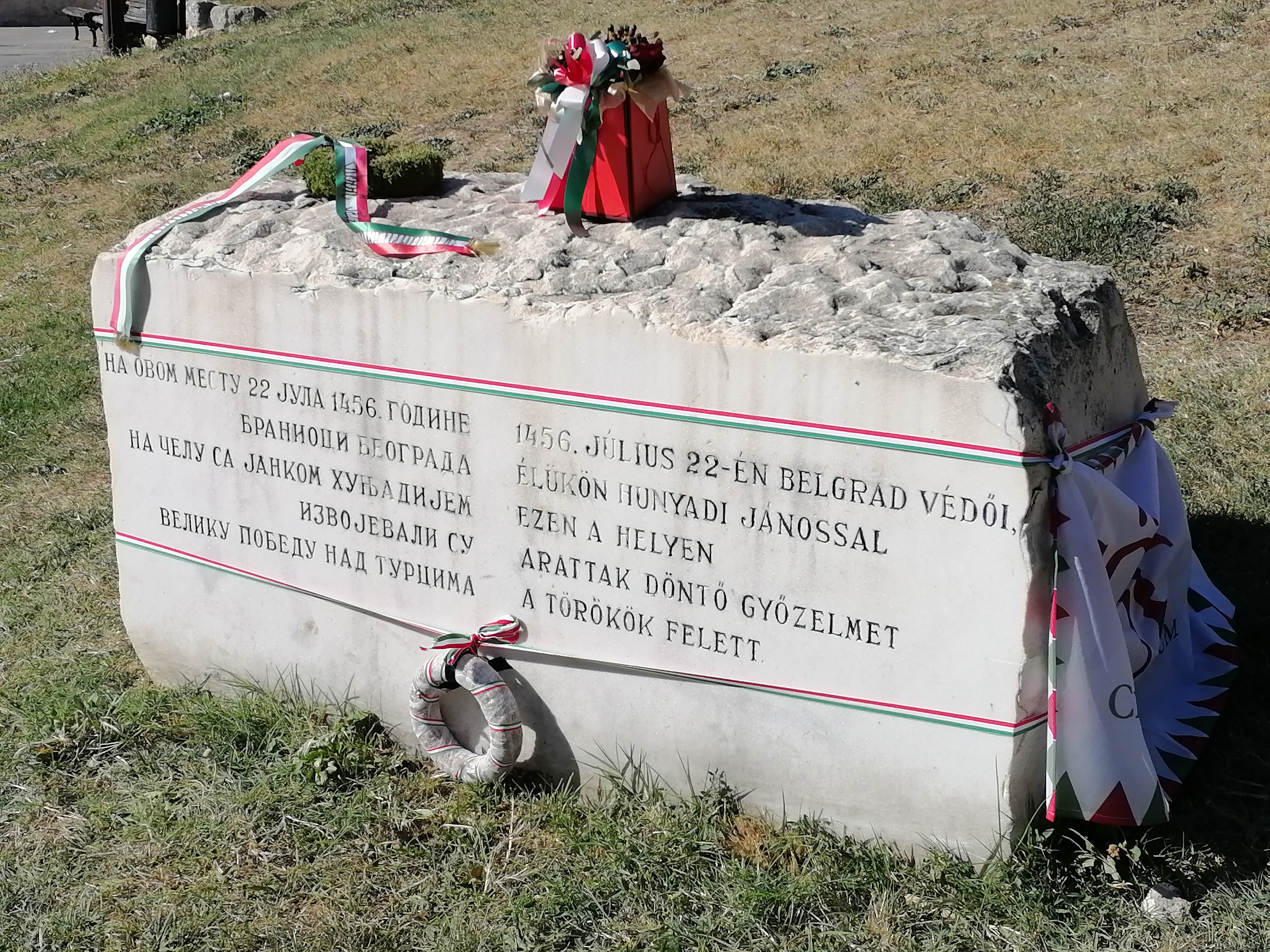
Stone in the Kalemegdan Park, in Belgrade, with engraved inscription on the place where Christian forces under command of John Hunyadi won the battle against the Ottomans in 1456.

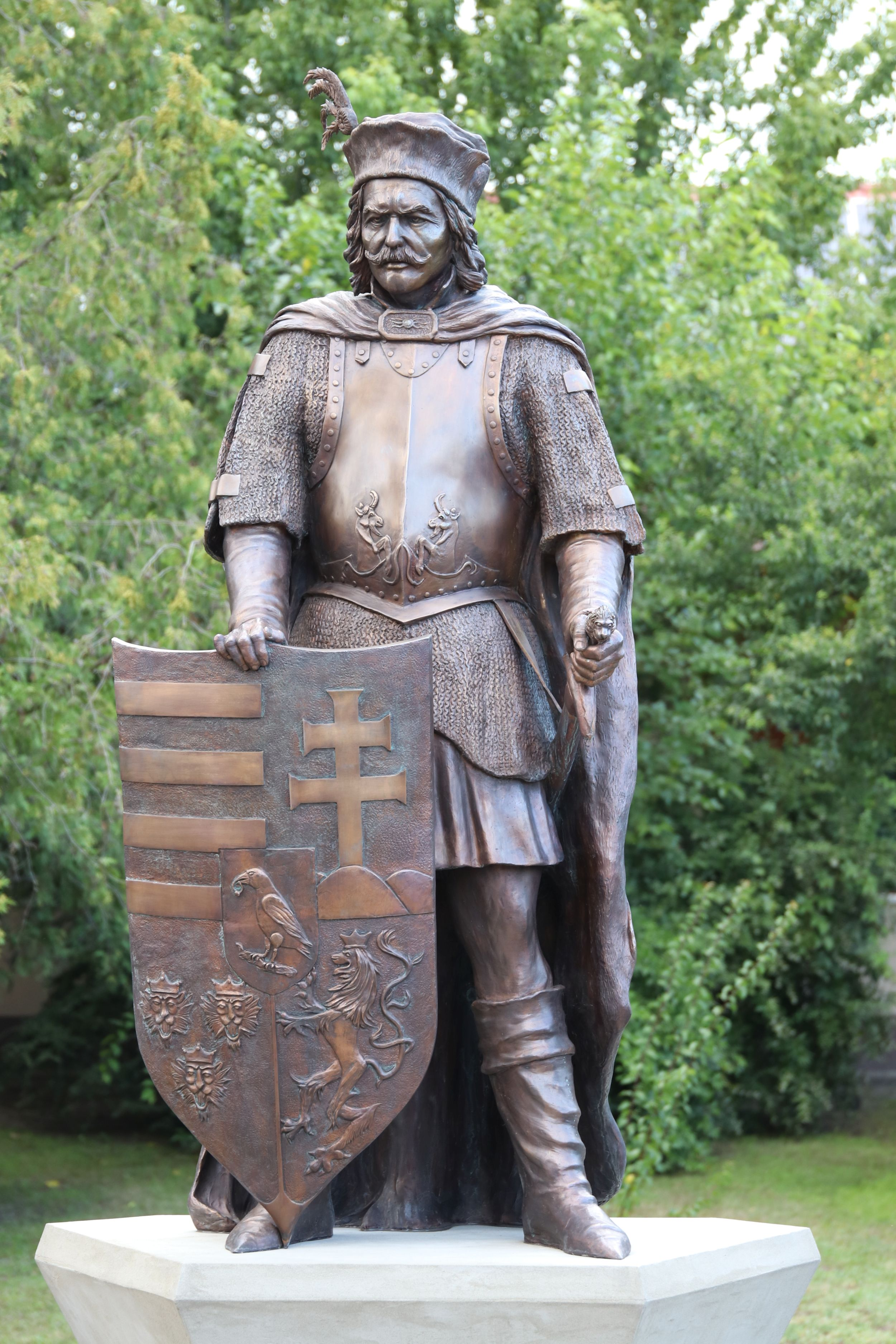
Statue of Michael Szilágyi in Ásotthalom (2019)

The victory stopped the Ottoman advance towards Europe beyond the Balkans for 70 years, though they made other incursions such as the taking of Otranto between 1480 and 1481; and the raid of Croatia and Styria in 1493. Belgrade would continue to protect Hungary from Ottoman attacks until the fort fell to the Ottomans in 1521.

After the siege of Belgrade stopped the advance of Mehmed II towards Central Europe, Serbia and Bosnia were absorbed into the Empire. Wallachia, the Crimean Khanate, and eventually Moldavia were merely converted into vassal states due to the strong military resistance to Mehmed's attempts of conquest. There were several reasons of why the Sultan did not directly attack Hungary and why he gave up the idea of advancing in that direction after his unsuccessful siege of Belgrade. The mishap at Belgrade indicated that the Empire could not expand further until Serbia and Bosnia were transformed into a secure base of operations. Furthermore, the significant political and military power of Hungary under Matthias Corvinus in the region surely influenced this hesitation too. Moreover, Mehmed was also distracted in his attempts to suppress insubordination from his Moldovan and Wallachian vassals.

With Hunyadi's victory at Belgrade, both Vlad III the Impaler and Stephen III of Moldavia came to power in their own domains, and Hunyadi himself went to great lengths to have his son Matthias placed on the Hungarian throne. While fierce resistance and Hunyadi's effective leadership ensured that the daring and ambitious Sultan Mehmed would only get as far into Europe as the Balkans, the Sultan had already managed to transform the Ottoman Empire into what would become one of the most feared powers in Europe (as well as in Asia) for centuries. Most of Hungary was eventually conquered in 1526 at the Battle of Mohács. Ottoman Muslim expansion into Europe continued with menacing success until the siege of Vienna in 1529, although Ottoman power in Europe remained strong and still threatening to Central Europe at times until the Battle of Vienna in 1683.

== Literature and art ==
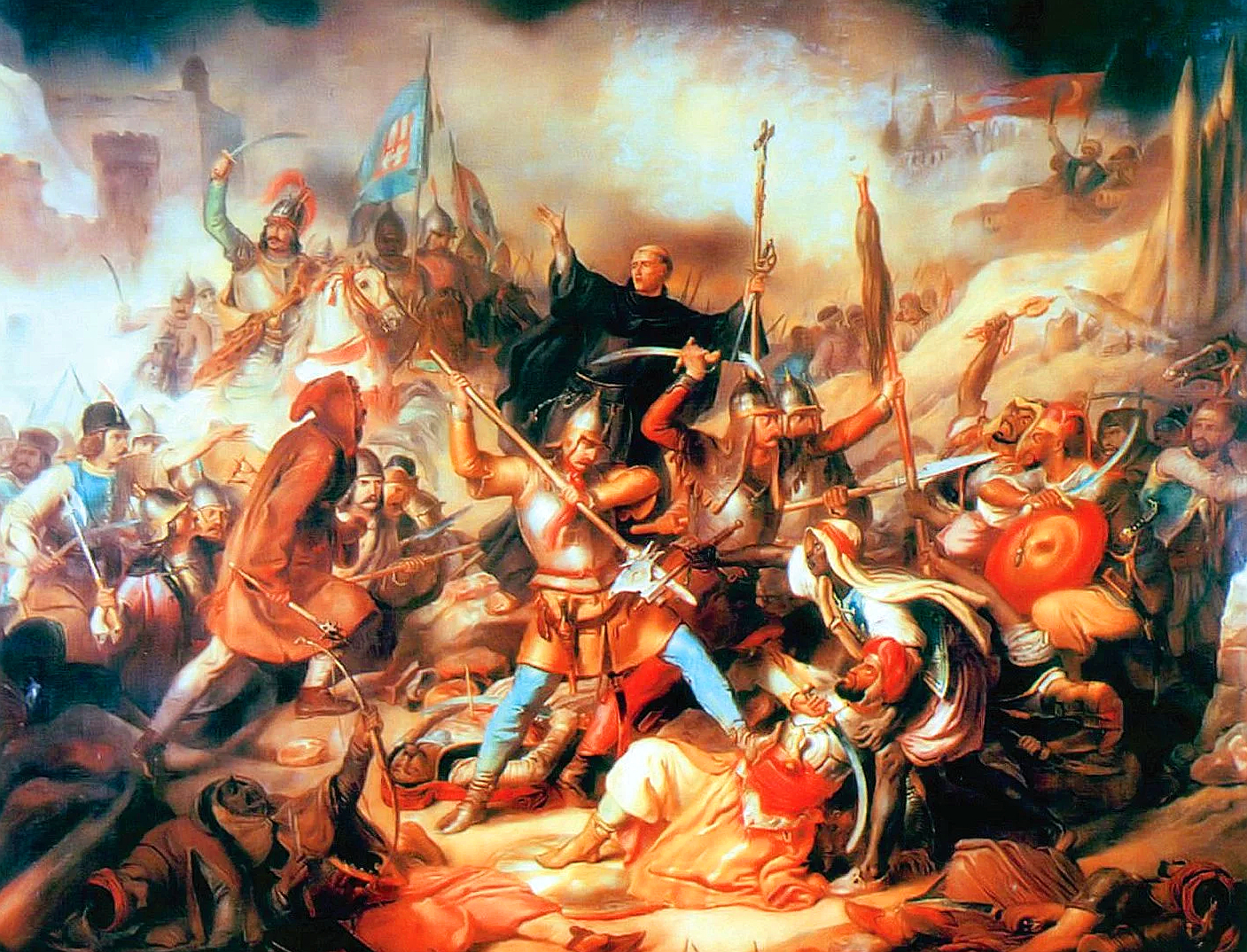
Battle of Nándorfehérvár, Hungarian painting from the 19th century. In the middle, Giovanni da Capistrano with the cross in his hand.

English poet and playwright Hannah Brand wrote a five-act tragedy about the battle and siege of Belgrade, which was first performed in 1791. A fictional series about the siege from the viewpoint of a Christian mercenary is Christian Cameron's Tom Swan and the Siege of Belgrade, published from 2014 to 2015.

The Hungarian book series Hunyadi was adapted to a television miniseries, Rise of the Raven, released in 2025. In Rise of the Raven, John Hunyadi devotes his life to defending Europe against the Ottoman invasion. As the Ottoman Empire mobilizes an enormous army to conquer Hungary, Hunyadi leads his smaller but formidable forces into battle, sealing a hard-fought victory at the Siege of Belgrade.
