= Karaca Pasha =

Senior Turkish commander (d. 1456)

Karaca Pasha (Karadja Pasha, Turkish: Karaca Paşa) was the Beylerbey of Rumelia during Mehmed the Conqueror's reign and played a role in the Ottoman conquest of Constantinople. According to the common view, he was given the epithet “Dayı” because he was the maternal uncle of Şehzade Alaeddin, the son of Murad II. He made a reputation for himself in the Battle of Varna during the reign of Murad II. He died during the siege of Belgrade in 1456. His hometown Karacabey District in Bursa is named after him.

== Sources ==
- Nicolle, David (2000). Constantinople 1453: The End of Byzantium. Osprey Publishing. ISBN 1-84176-091-9.
