= Leipzig Panometer =

Attraction in Leipzig, Germany

Coordinates: 51°18′52″N 12°23′12″E

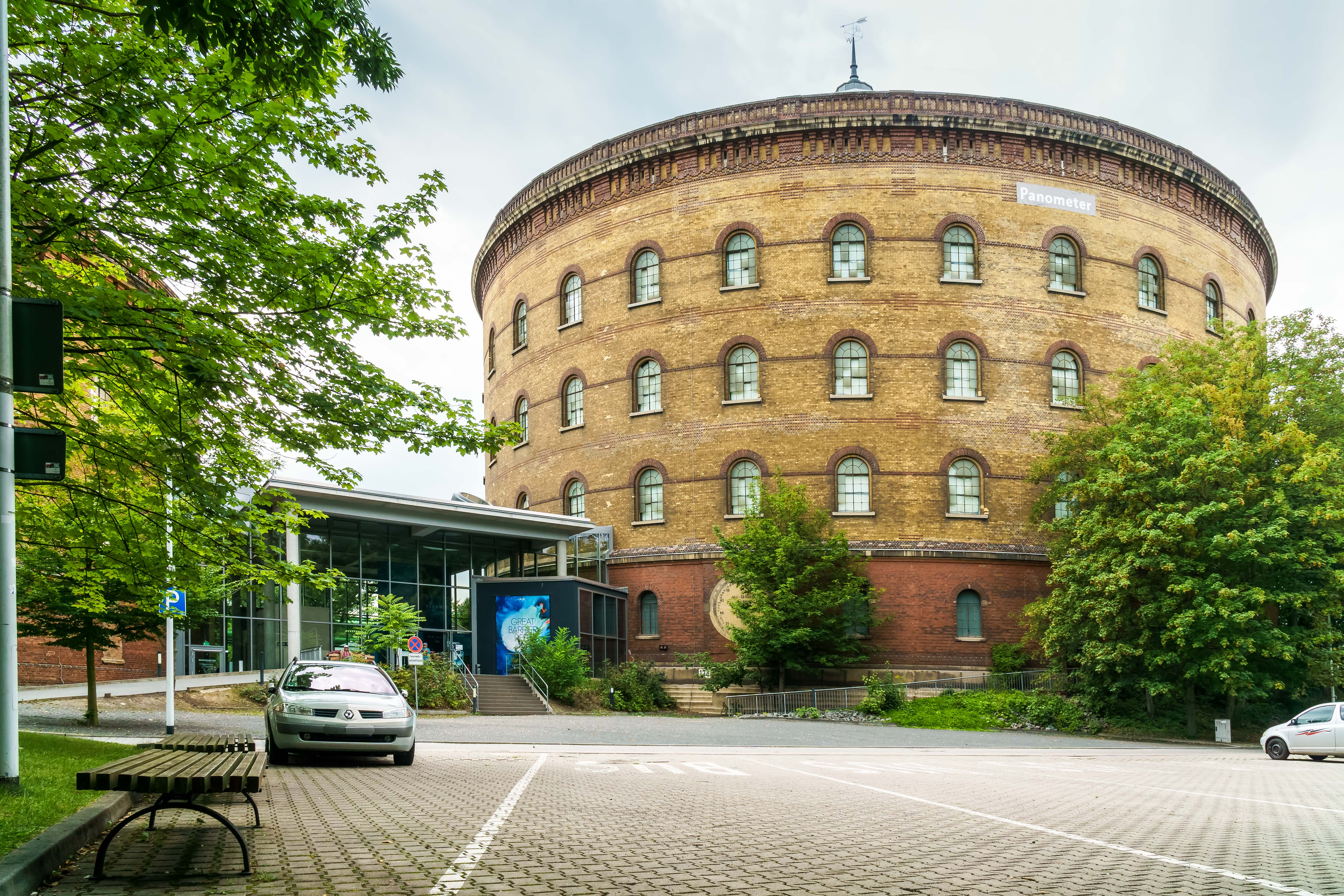
The Panometer Leipzig

The Leipzig Panometer is an attraction in Leipzig, Germany. It is a visual panorama displayed inside a former gasometer, accompanied by a thematic exhibition. The current theme is "Antarctica". The Panometer was created in 2003 by the Austrian-born artist Yadegar Asisi, who coined the name as a portmanteau of "panorama" and "gasometer". He opened another Panometer in Dresden in 2006. His panoramas are also displayed in Berlin, Pforzheim, Wittenberg, Hanover and Rouen.

== Building ==
The Leipzig Panometer occupies a disused telescopic gas holder in Connewitz. The gasometer was built in 1909, under Hugo Licht, and was in operation until 1977. It has a diameter of 57 metres (187 ft) and a total height of 49 metres (161 ft), including the cupola with lantern. From 2002 to 2005 it was renovated to allow the transformation into Asisi's panoramic display. The final step was the addition of a glass foyer, which connects it to an adjacent gasometer and also contains the restaurant.

== Panorama and exhibition ==
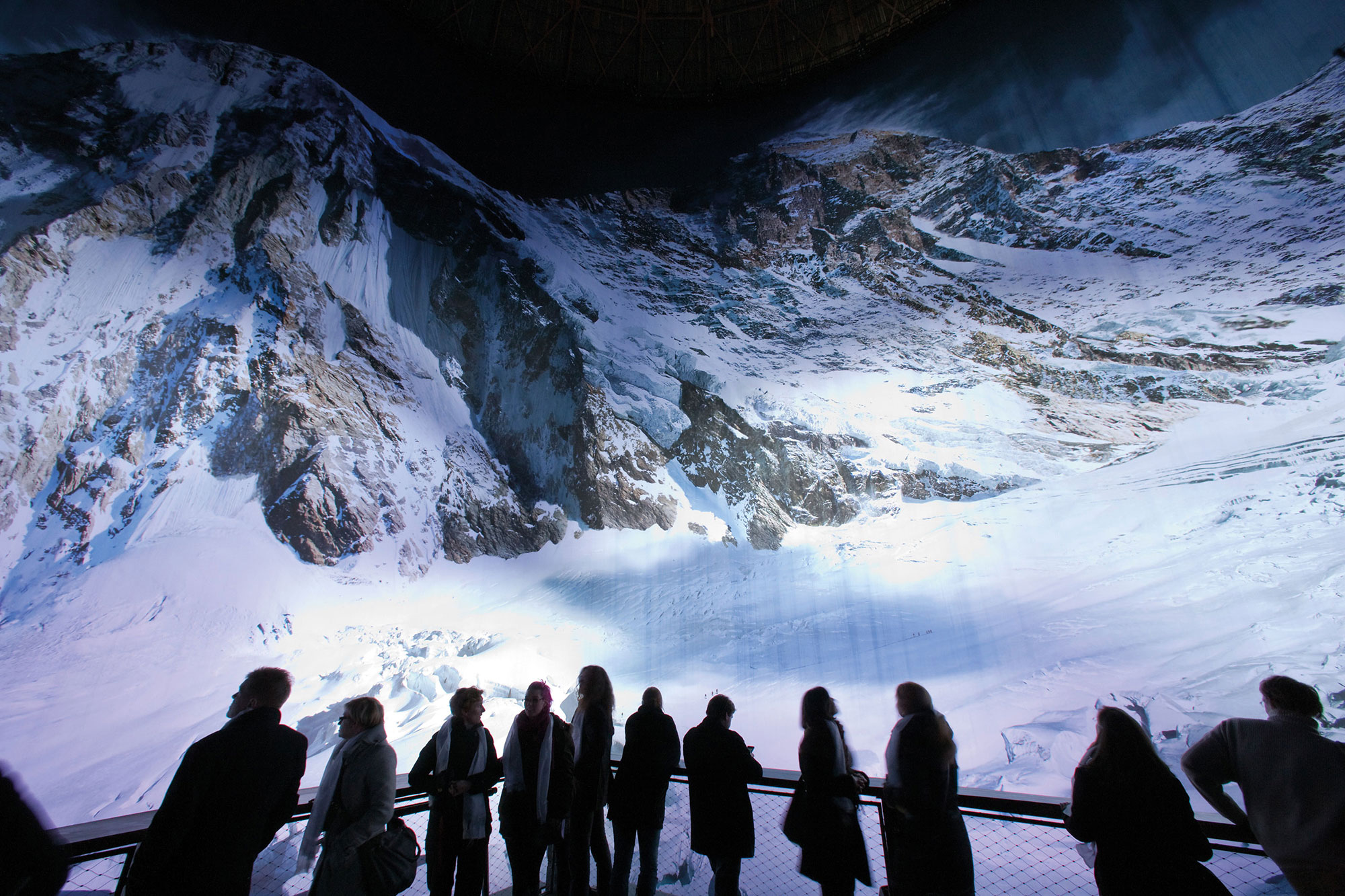
'Everest' at Leipzig Panometer

So far the panoramic pictures have been 105 metres (344 ft) in circumference and around 30 metres (98 ft) in height, making them currently the largest such pictures in the world. (The one in Dresden is slightly less tall.) Digital technology is used to combine photos, drawings and paintings into a single large picture file, which is then printed onto individual strips of textile. The strips are combined into a circular picture which is then hung up as a single piece. The panorama is viewed from a raised platform in the centre. Perspective distortion is used to create an impression of space.

There are also light and sound effects, including a simulated day-night cycle, sounds from nature, and music composed especially by the Belgian composer Eric Babak

In the area between the panorama and the outer wall there is an exhibition on a theme related to the picture, as well as a film viewing room.

== Themes ==
2003–05: Mount Everest. The viewer's vantage point was from the Valley of Silence. The accompanying exhibition showed the history of Western journeys to Everest on one side of the building, and the viewpoint of local Buddhist inhabitants on the other. This included a mandala made from coloured sand and a stupa constructed in Nepal (both sacred artworks).

2005–09: Ancient Rome. A recreation of an 1889 panorama of Rome by Alexander von Wagner, portraying Constantine the Great's entry into the city following his success in the Battle of the Milvian Bridge in 312. The exhibition covered the day-to-day life and architecture of Ancient Rome, and featured plaster casts from the University of Leipzig's antiques collection along with paintings, architectural drawings and models of famous Roman buildings. It included a reconstruction of the partly destroyed, 12 metres (39 ft) high Colossus of Constantine, rebuilt as an anamorphosis (a kind of visual illusion). Since December 2014 this panorama and the colossus are displayed in the Pforzheim Gasometer.

2009–13: Amazonia. This was made to honour the 150th anniversary of the death of Alexander von Humboldt, the German naturalist who explored South America. The panorama shows a diverse and detailed image of the flora and fauna of the rainforest, in which some smaller animals are only visible with a telescope. The sound and light effects include animal calls and a simulated tropical rainstorm. Humboldt had expressed his desire for a panorama which would "show nature in its wild luxuriance and the fullness of life". The exhibition includes a large model (60:1) of a mosquito.

2013-2015: Leipzig 1813. A new exhibition opened on 3 August 2013 to mark the 200th anniversary of the Battle of Leipzig, depicting not the battle itself, but Leipzig at that time.

2015−2017: The Great Barrier Reef, showing the reef in front of Australia's coast from under water.

2017−2019: The Titanic, depicting the sunken wreck as a manmade symbol to outperform nature and to fail.

2019-2022: Carolas Garten, a panorama by Yadegar Asisi that depicts the garden of a former employee of the Panometer in detail. You are the size of an ant, looking up at all the things in the garden. A bee is depicted in such a close-up that the pollen clinging to the hairs of its legs is visible.

2022-?: New York 9/11, war in times of peace, recalls the attacks of 11 September and their far-reaching global impact, and allows for a complex consideration of the subsequent events.

2026-?: Antarctica
