= Antonio Bonfini =

Italian humanist and poet

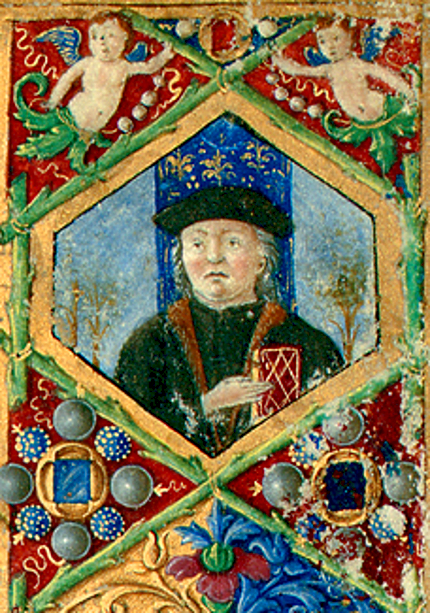
- Born: 1427
- Died: 1502 (aged 74–75); Buda
- Occupations: Priest, canon, chronicler, historian
- Writing career
- Language: Latin
- Subject: History of the Hungarians

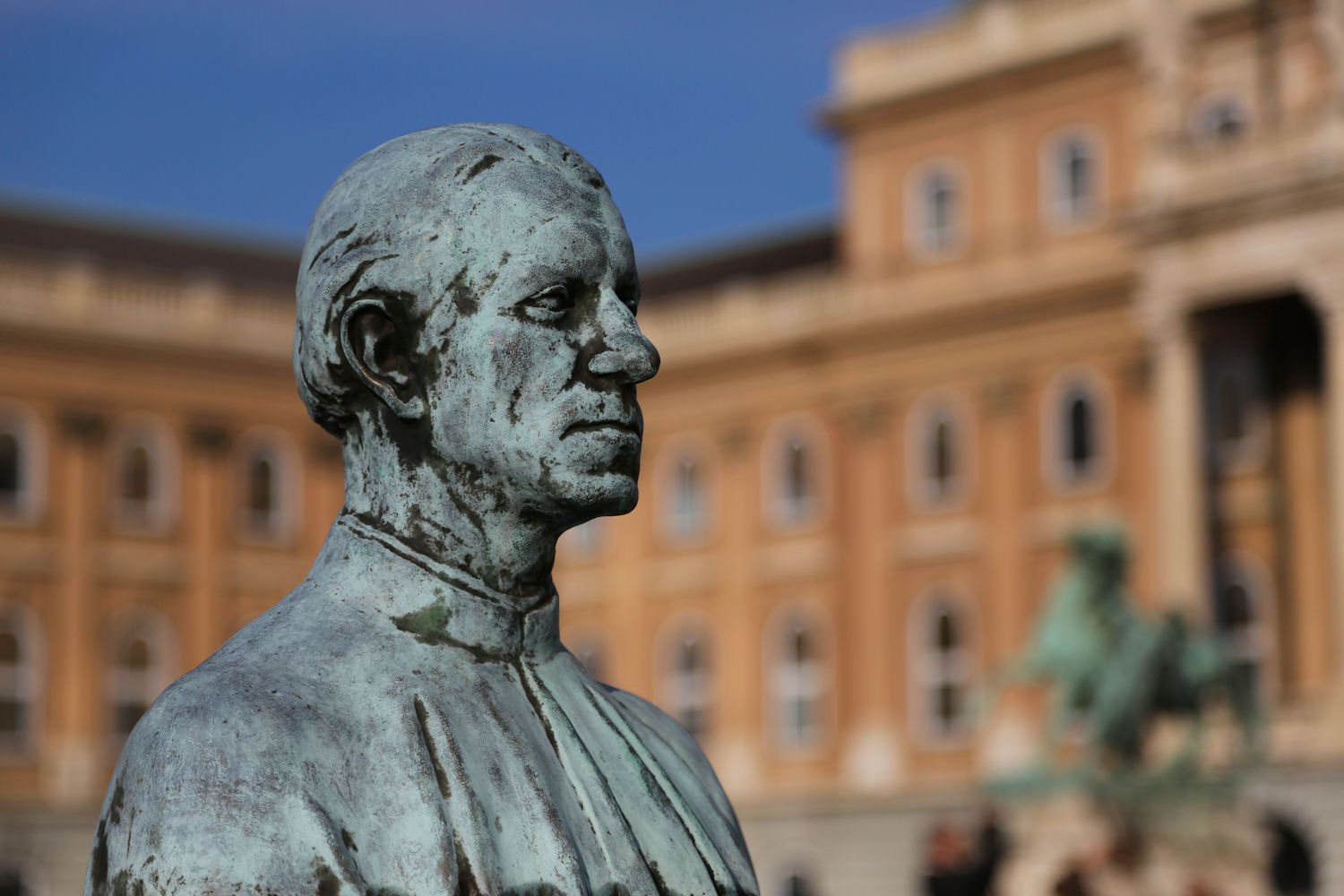
Statue of Bonfini in Budapest

Antonio Bonfini (Latin variant: Antonius Bonfinius) (1427‒1502) was an Italian humanist and poet serving as a court historian in Hungary under King Matthias Corvinus during the last years of his career.

Bonfini was commissioned by Matthias Corvinus to produce a work chronicling the History of Hungary. Bonfini's great work is the Rerum Hungaricarum decades (Decades of Hungarian History). Bonfini gained invaluable merit in the history-writing of Hungary with this work. Until the late 18th century, this work served as a primary source for Hungarian history in European academic circles.
