= Alexander von Wagner =

Hungarian painter (1838–1919)

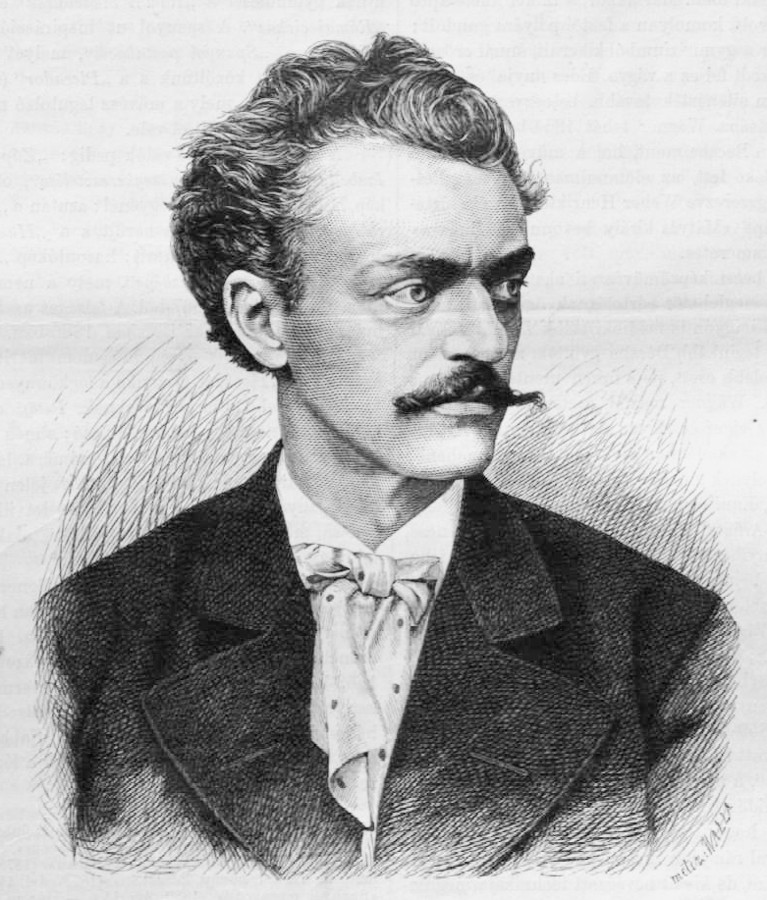
Von Wagner in 1880

Alexander originally Sándor von Wagner (April 16, 1838 – January 19, 1919) was a Hungarian painter.

== Biography ==
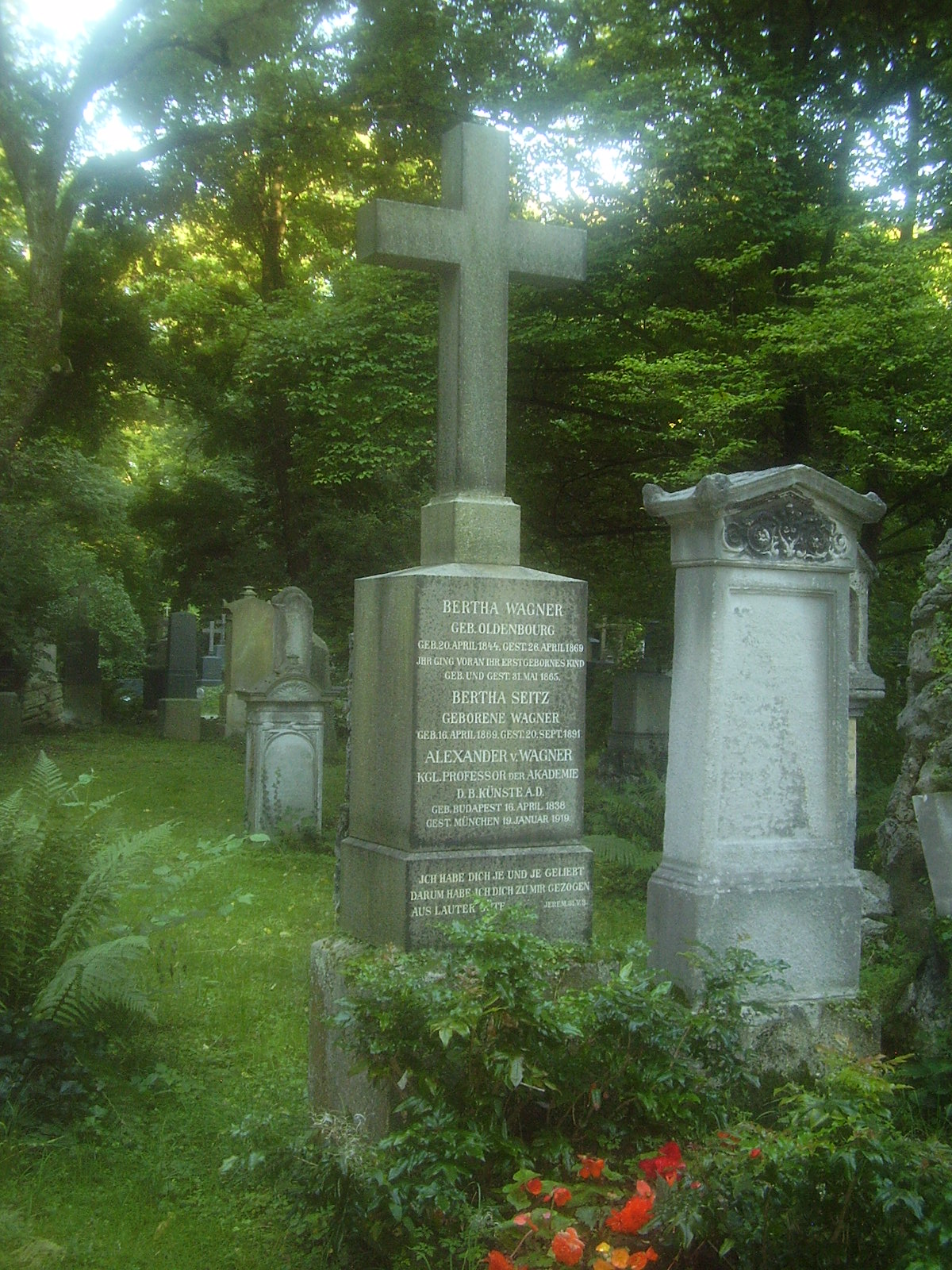
Grave of Alexander von Wagner in Munich

Wagner was born in Pest. After graduating from the Real-Gymnasium in his hometown at the age of nineteen, he entered the Academy of Fine Arts at Vienna, where he was a student of Henrik Weber. The following year, he switched to the Royal Academy of Fine Arts at Munich and was taught by Professor Karl von Piloty from 1856 to 1864. From 1869 to 1910 he was professor in history painting at the Munich Academy. His themes were history paintings and Hungarian life scenes in particular. A portrait of Von Wagner painted by Franz Lachner belongs to the collection of the Gebrüder-Lachner-Museum in Rain since 2003. Among his students were Pál Szinyei Merse, Emil Wiesel, Anton Ažbe, Franciszek Żmurko.

Von Wagner died in Munich, where he is buried in the Old Southern Cemeterey.

== Works ==
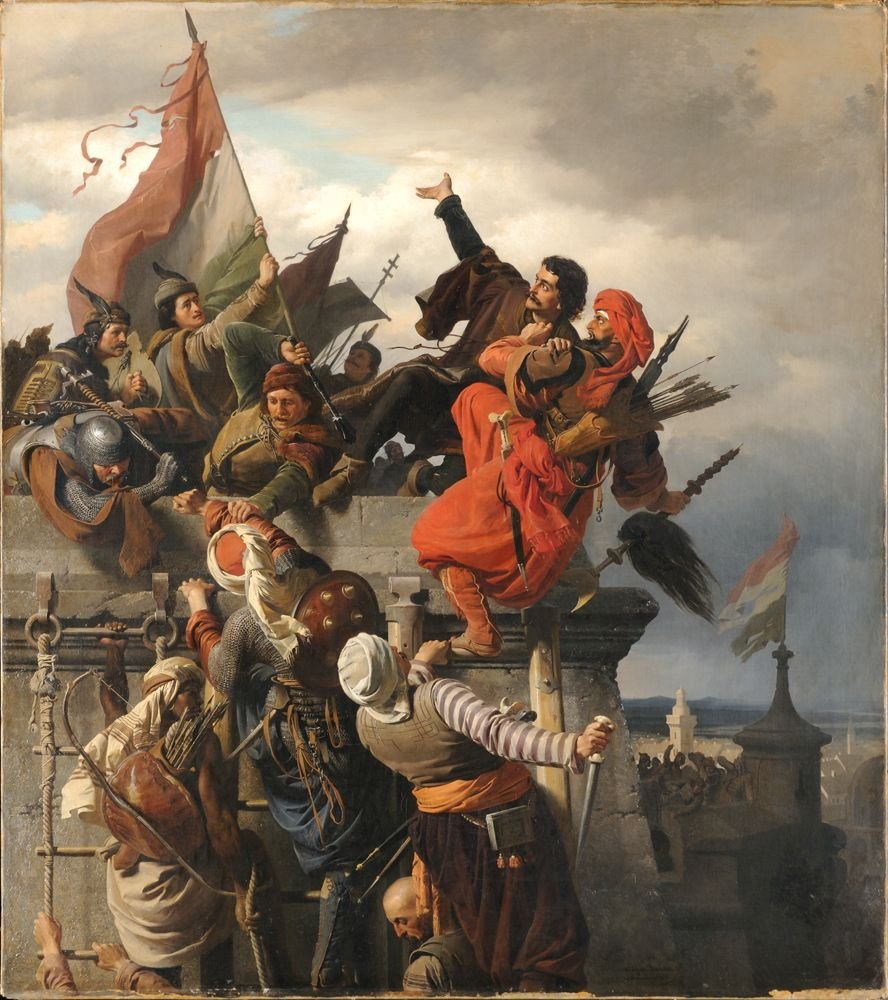
Titusz Dugovics sacrifices himself in the Siege of Belgrade (1859)

His most famous work is The Chariot Race (now at the Manchester Art Gallery), which he painted for the Vienna Exposition (1873) and then expanded to a larger size for the Columbian Exposition (Chicago Fair) of 1893. The painting depicts the close of a chariot race in the Circus Maximus in Ancient Rome, presided over by Emperor Domitian. Chariot Race was completed in 1882 just two years after the publication of Ben-Hur. The painting depicts the loss of a wheel of a chariot at the height of the race. In the original book the wheel is "crushed", in the painting it is shown intact spinning off to the left.

In the painting After the Hunt (1864) Wagner portrayed his wife Bertha von Oldenburg in the circle of an elegant company of hunters, dressed in the historical costumes from the period of Matthias Corvinus. Another famous work was a round panorama of old Rome, titled Das alte Rom mit dem Triumphzuge Kaiser Constantin’s im Jahre 312 n.Chr., which he painted in cooperation with Josef Bühlmann in Munich in 1888. The painting was destroyed, and repainted by Yadegar Asisi in the Leipzig Panometer.

Further works (selection)

- After the Hunt (Mathias Corvinus)
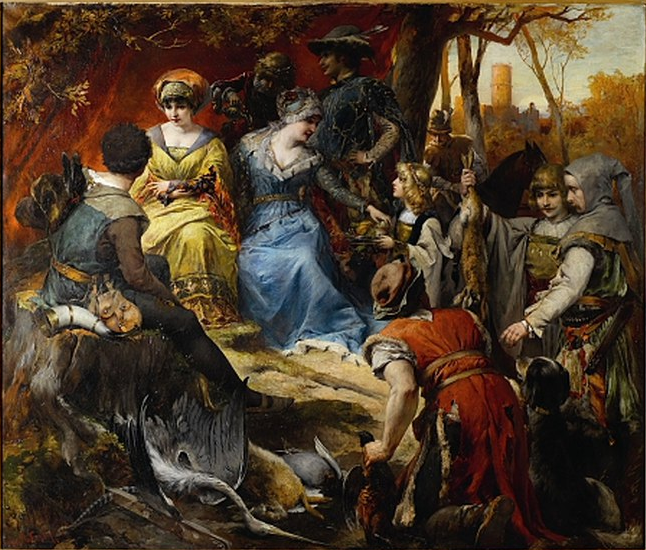
  After the Hunt (1864)
- Titusz Dugovics opfert sich in der Schlacht um Belgrad (Titusz Dugovics Sacrifices himself in the Battle of Belgrade), 1859, today in the Hungarian National Gallery (Budapest)
- Königin Izabella's Abschied aus Transsylvanien (Queen Izabella's farewell from Transylvania)
- Markttag
- Mátyás besiegt Holubár (Mátyás defeats Holubár, fresco), Hungarian State Opera House, 1865
- Pferdetrieb auf der Hortobagyer Puszta in Ungarn, around 1880
- Das Wagenrennen, 1882, today in the Manchester Art Gallery
- Wagenrennen im Circus Maximus in Rom zur Zeit des Domitian
- Ungarisches Fuhrwerk
- decoration of the "Saal der Republiken" (hall of the republics), Hamburg Rathaus, 1899 "The Chariot Race" (Manchester Art Gallery, England)
