= Siege of Jajce (disambiguation) =

Siege of Jajce may refer to:

- Siege of Jajce (1463), a successful retaking of Jajce by Hungarian and Croatian forces, several months after Ottoman capture
- Siege of Jajce (1464), an attempt by Ottoman Turks to retrieve Jajce; however, despite massive bombardment, the final Turkish assault was heavily repulsed
- Battle of Jajce (1518), a battle between the Ottoman forces of Husrev Beg, Beylerbey of the Bosnia Eyalet, and the Hungarian and Croatian forces led by Croatian Ban Petar Berislavić after which Jajce was reprovisioned but remained under Ottoman pressure

== See also ==
- Operation Vrbas '92, a military offensive undertaken by Bosnian Serb army in June–October 1992, during the Bosnian War
