= Battle of Novigrad =

Battle of Novigrad (1515)
- Part of Ottoman–Croatian Wars
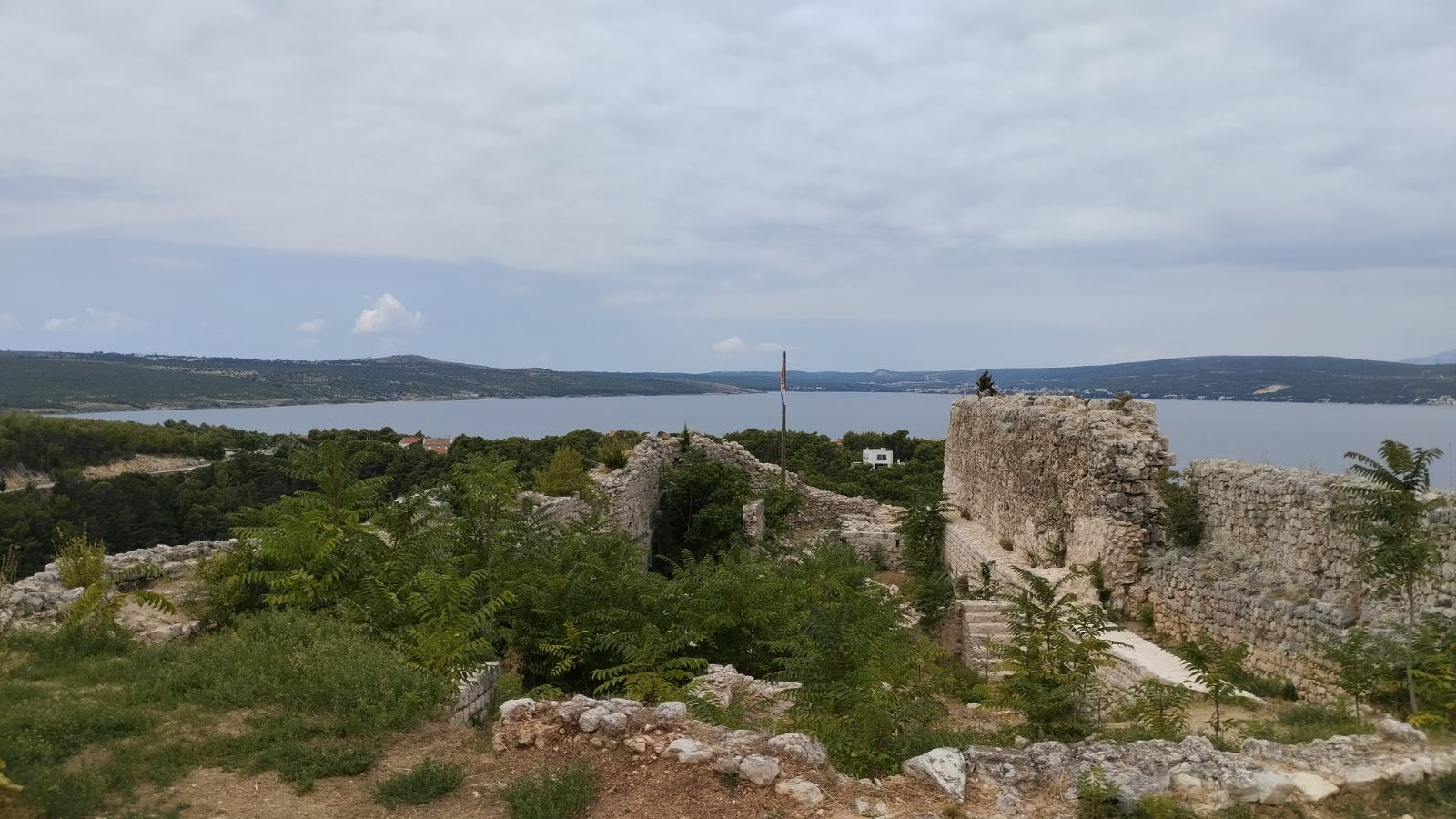
- Novigrad Castle
Date	May 1515
Location	Novigrad, Zadar County, Croatia
Result	Ottoman victory

Belligerents
Kingdom of Croatia	Ottoman Empire

Commanders and leaders
Petar Berislavić	Pasha of Bosnia

Strength
2,500–10,000 men	Unknown

Casualties and losses
All but 25 killed	Unknown

The Battle of Novigrad was a military engagement between the Kingdom of Croatia and the Ottoman Empire in Novigrad, Zadar County. The Croatians, led by Petar Berislavić, were defeated by the Ottomans.

== Background ==
Petar Berislavić was the Ban of Croatia who ruled at the time of the Ottoman threat. Berislavić took the task of defending Croatia from them, who, starting in 1463, almost every year invaded Croatia. On June 15, 1513, Pope Leo X sent the ban of 50,000 ducats for this purpose. Thus Berislavić was able, in short order, to assemble a considerable army. On August 16, the Ottomans suffered a defeat near Dubica. This victory made Berislavić famous. The Pope sent him a blessed sword and hat. Yet this did not stop Ottoman incursion.

On September, 1514, an Ottoman force of 4,000 men invaded Croatia, ravaging and devastating the estates of the Krbava nobleman Ivan Karlović. They also pushed into the neighboring districts of Venetian Dalmatia, from where they returned to Bosnia with 3,000 captives and much livestock. At the end of 1514, they again invaded southern Croatia, where they captured Karin, Korlat, and a castle near Novigrad. In these raids, the nobles of the old Croatian county of Luka suffered the most.

In order to intimidate the Ottomans, Berislavić decided to wage an offensive war. He requested aid from all sides. Thus, he obtained 1,500 golden florins from Dubrovnik. Pope Leo X sent him a great quantity of grain, gunpowder, sulfur, saltpeter, and several types of cannons, and beyond that, 2,000 ducats. In addition, the Pope sent letters to all rulers of Europe, imploring them to aid the exhausted Croatia and her ban.

== Battle ==
On May 1515, Berislavić crossed over Velebit into Dalmatia, where, with 500 cavalry and 2,000 infantry, he camped near the then-Venetian town of Šibenik. There, he expected 5,000 Czech soldiers, with whom he intended to retake Karin, Korlat, and the castle near Novigrad from the Ottomans. Nevertheless, this campaign against the Ottomans ended in the ban’s crushing defeat. Venetian senator Michieli reported on May 28, 1515, that Berislavić “camped with 10,000 men near a certain Turkish place by Novigrad, where the Pasha of Bosnia attacked him, routed him, and captured his cannons, while the ban barely escaped with only 25 horsemen.”

== Aftermath ==
After this victory, the pasha turned against the Jajce Banovina. First, the Ottomans captured the towns of Jezero and Bočac and then surrounded the town of Jajce. However, the Ottoman withdrew as a relief army approached. From then on, Berislavić supplied Jajce with provisions, arms, and a garrison. Through his efforts, this outpost of Croatia was preserved for several more years.

== Sources ==
- Mate Ujević (1941), Croatian Encyclopedia Volume 2 (In Croatian).
- Rudolf Horvat (1924), History of Croatia, Book I. From the earliest times to 1657 (In Croatian).
- Zaninović, Joško (June 16, 1994). "Kako je biskup, ban i vranski prior Petar Berislavić pribavio Hrvatskoj naslov »Predziđe kršćanstva«" [How the bishop, ban, and prior of Vranje, Petar Berislavić, obtained the title of "forerunner of Christianity" for Croatia]. Croatica Christiana periodica (in Croatian). 18 (33).
