= Toma Niger =

Roman Catholic bishop

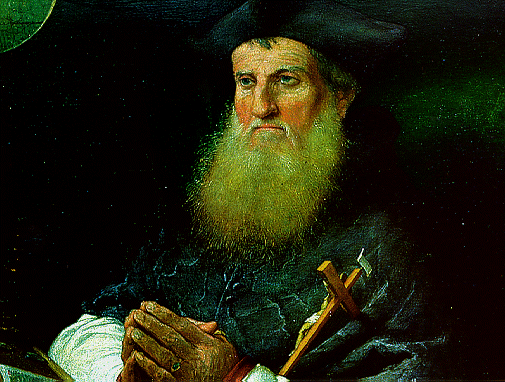
- Toma Niger by Lorenzo Lotto in 1527
- Born: c. 1450; Split, Republic of Venice
- Died: c. 1532; Split, Republic of Venice
- Occupation: Bishop, diplomat, humanist
- Period: Renaissance

Toma Niger (Croatian: Toma Niger Mrčić; Latin: Thoma Nigro or Nigris; c. 1450 – c. 1532) was a Croatian humanist, diplomat, bishop of Skradin, and at the end of his life he served as the bishop of Trogir. He committed most of his life to diplomacy, trying to help crumbling Kingdom of Croatia against the Ottoman Empire.

== Life ==
Toma was born in Split (at the time Spalato, part of the Republic of Venice) between 1450 and 1460. Although his father was an eminent citizen of Split who carried a title "ser", he was of common birth. Toma had brother Kristofor and a sister, whose son was also named Kristofor. He took the name "Niger/Nigris" probably as a Latinisation of his surname "Mrčić", as it was the fashion in humanism. He was probably educated in Split, and later in Italy. From 1487 he was professor of grammar in Hvar and Split. Around 1499 he became archdeacon and vicar of the archbishop of Split. Toma participated in the Fifth Council of the Lateran in 1512 as a secretary of the archbishop of Split, Bernardo Zanne. In the same year, Toma returned to Split, and supported Hvar Rebellion against Venice, under the leadership of Matija Ivanić. After the conspiracy was discovered, he was taken captive and, along with other eminent citizens of Split, taken to Venice, but was allowed to return in 1514. Serving as a legate of Croatian ban Petar Berislavić, he was sent to Rome where he appealed to Pope Leo X. The Pope sent help, naming Croatia "antemurale Christianitatis" and appointing Toma to be bishop of Skradin. After Skradin was taken by the Turks, Toma was appointed by the Pope as the bishop of Trogir in 1524, but he soon resigned the honor due to his old age. His nephew Kristofor took over the honor in 1525. He was described by the Venetian historian Marino Sanuto the Younger, during Niger's stay in Venice in 1527 in the following terms: "He has a long white beard. He travels with 8 horses and 30 soldiers. He is always sad and is blaming the doge not only for his desire to rule everywhere but also because of his ruses in politics, which consequently speedened the fall of Croatia". Toma retired to Franciscan Monastery in Poljud, Split where he died somewhere around 1532. His tombstone stands in the cloister of the monastery.

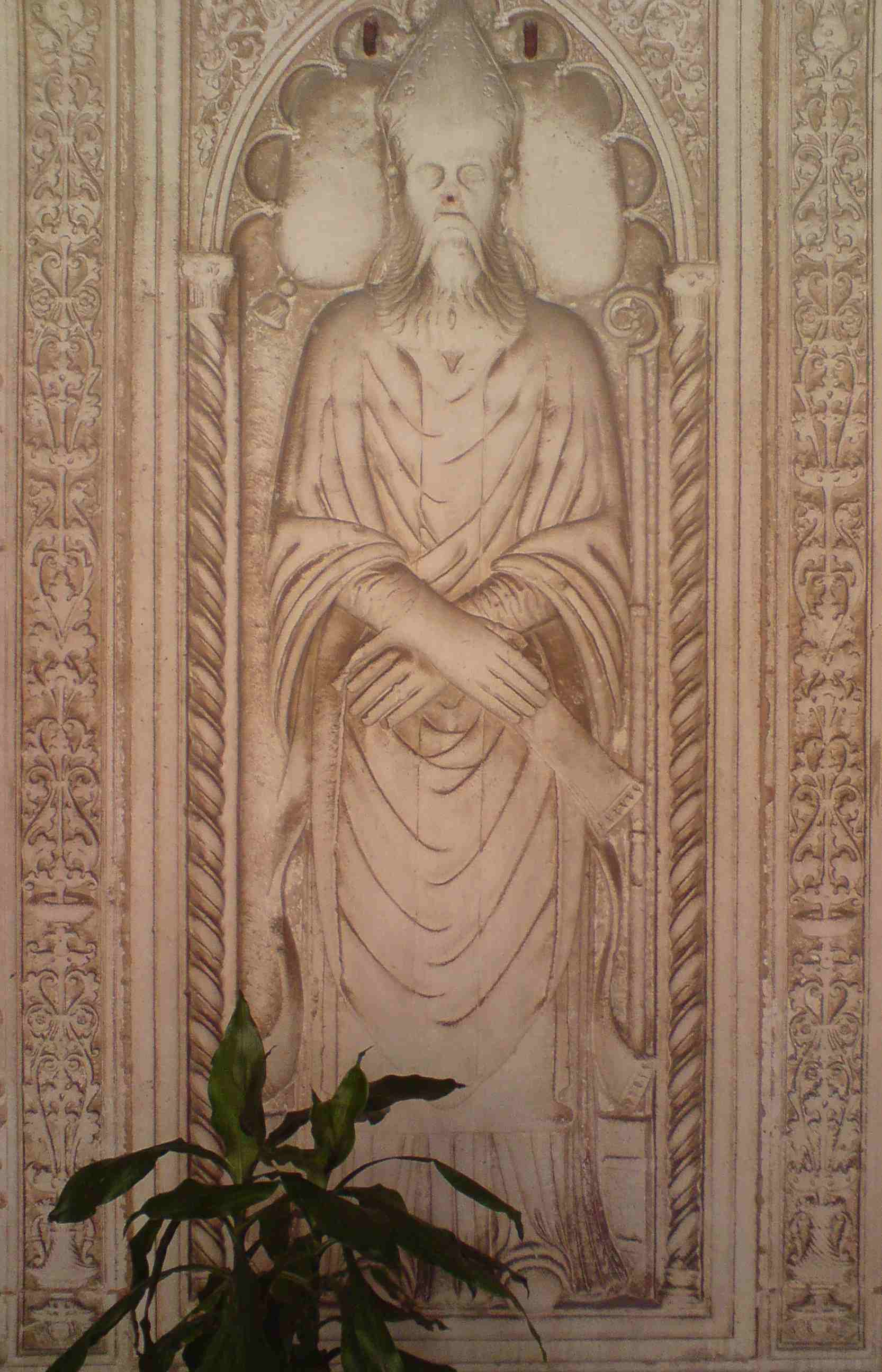
Gravestone of Toma Niger in Franciscan Monastery in Poljud, Split

== Diplomatic work ==
Toma's diplomatic work began somewhere around 1499. As a secretary of the archbishop of Split he went to Venice, and in 1503 through Zagreb to Hungary. He also visited Bohemia and Poland. At the Fifth Council of the Lateran in 1512 he spoke brusquely against Turkish invasion and crimes against the citizens of Split. In 1514 ban Petar Berislavić appointed him as his legate. In 1515 he went to Venice, later to the Pope in Rome, and Emperor Charles V in Brussels appealing for help and describing the difficult position of Croatia. He achieved some results, getting modest help from European rulers. Pope Clement VII sent help to Klis Fortress (in 1524) which was besieged by Ottoman forces. In 1522 he went to Kraków and Buda, but after crushing defeat at the Battle of Mohács, Toma decided to withdraw from diplomacy.

== Works ==
Toma was well acquainted with famous Croatian nobles and writers like Vinko Pribojević, Marko Marulić and Šimun Kožičić Benja. He wrote foreword to Vinko Pribojević's De origine successibusque Slavorum, poem Ad Leonem decimum carmen against Luther and historical work Pontificum Salonitanorum et Spalatensium series ex Romanis et variis antiquis monumentis collecta a viro Dalma patriae et nationis suae amantissimo.

In his correspondence with Šimun Kožičić Benja in 1531, he was also alleged to be writing a book titled "Knjižice od hrvacke zemlje", a history of Croatia.

== Sources ==
- Antoljak, Stjepan: Hrvatska historiografija. Zagreb: Matica hrvatska, 2004.
- Škunca, Stanko Josip: "Toma Niger Mrčić", Radovi / Institute for Historical Sciences of the Croatian Academy of Sciences and Arts in Zadar, No. 43 October 2001.
