= Relief of Jajce (1518) =

1518 battle in contemporary Croatia

Battle of Jajce (1518)
- Part of the Ottoman wars in Europe; Ottoman–Croatian Wars
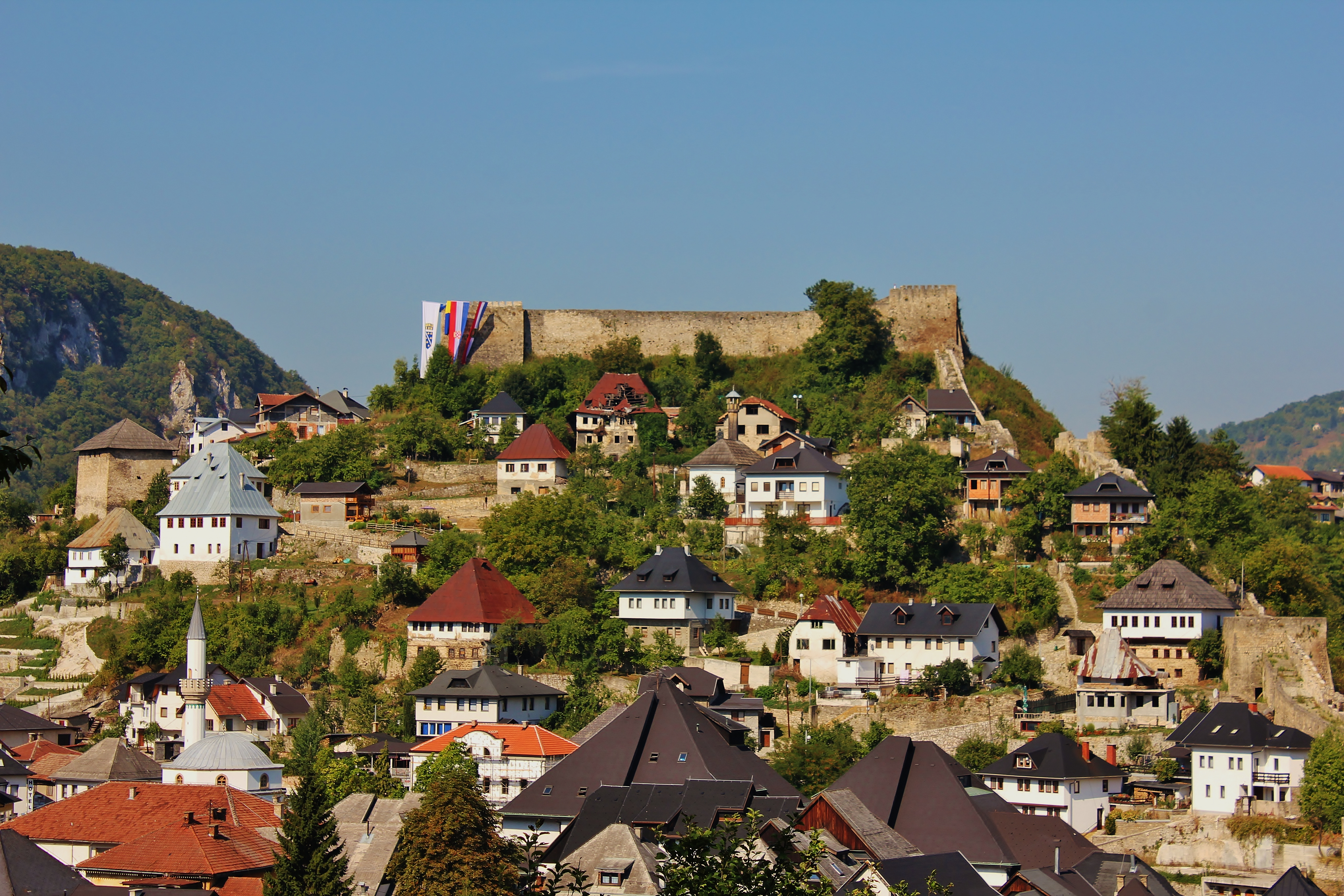
- Jajce fortress in 2011.
| Date | January 1518 |
| Location | Jajce, Banate of Jajce; Bočac and Jezero, Ottoman Empire |
| Result | Christian victory, Jajce defended from Ottoman threats and remained in Christian hands by an unsuccessful tactical attack on Ottoman strongholds |
| Territorial changes | Ottomans repelled tactical Christian offensive; no territorial changes |

Belligerents
| Ottoman Empire; Bosnia Eyalet | Kingdom of Hungary; Kingdom of Croatia |

Commanders and leaders
| Gazi Husrev-beg of Bosnia Eyalet | Ban Petar Berislavić |

Strength
| 2,000 | 4,000 cavalry, 6,000 infantry, some Hungarian artillery |

Casualties and losses
| Light | Heavy |

The Battle of Jajce (Croatian: Bitka kod Jajca) took place in January 1518 during a series of wars between the Ottoman forces of Husrev Beg, Beylerbey of the Bosnia Eyalet, and the Hungarian and Croatian forces led by Croatian Ban Petar Berislavić. The battle was a part of the Croatian–Ottoman wars and Ottoman–Hungarian wars. After Berislavić's tactical breakthrough to (although unsuccessfully) besiege adjacent Ottoman forts, Jajce remained in Christian hands.

== Prelude ==
The fortress of Jajce was built by Hrvoje Vukčić between 1391 and 1404. The fortifications grew over the years, encompassing a citadel and later a Jajce podgrađe itself became surrounded by the wall with towers, a two gatehouse, and a bastion. After a Hrvoje's death, Jajce and its župa came to Bosnian kings' control as royal demesne, and the walled city of Jajce later became official seat of the Bosnian kingdom. The fort fell to the Ottomans in 1463 during their conquest of Kingdom of Bosnia, but was soon retaken by Hungarian king Matija Korvin's counter offensive on 26 December of the same year. Hungarians heavily fortified Jajce and adjacent castles and made the town a seat of Banate of Jajce, a cordon sanitaire whose purpose was to protect territories of Croatia and Slavonia from Ottoman akinji plundering raids.

Jajce successfully withstood Ottoman attacks in 1464, 1491, 1493, 1501, 1502, 1514, and 1515. Instead of charging onto the fortress, the Ottomans eventually decided to starve it into surrender, by cutting off its food supply, preventing local people from growing their own food, capturing surrounding towns and keeping the town's surrounding under constant pressure by having a permanent military presence in the area. The town therefore remained a salient in Ottoman territory and as the Ottoman grip around it grew stronger, Croatian-Hungarian armies had to make forced breakthroughs into the city in order to reprovision it and keep its garrison functioning.

== Battle ==
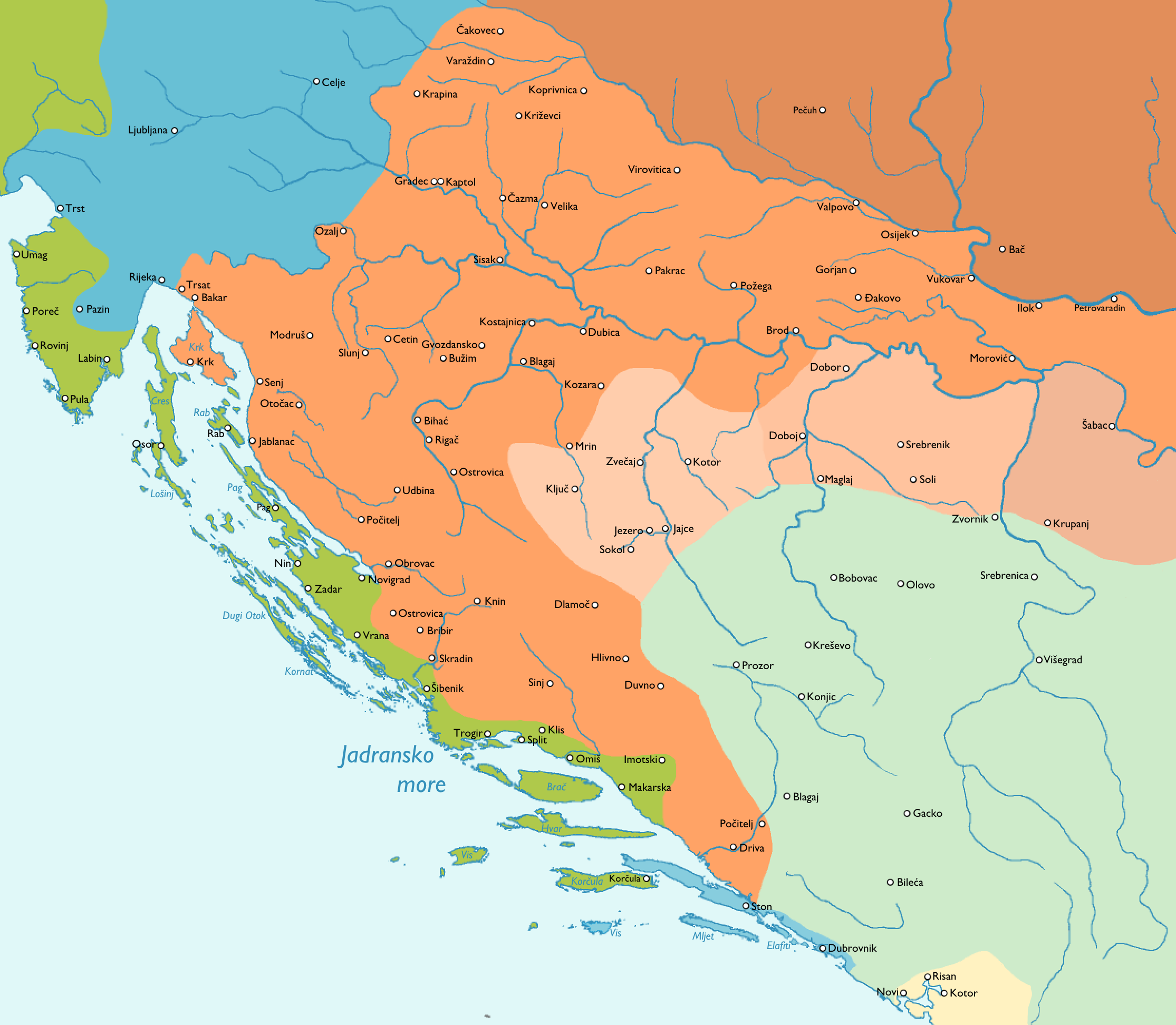
Banate of Jajce was (marked in light orange on the map), whose Jajce fortress was a seat of. The map shows the territory as it was approximately in year 1500.

After the Battle of Novigrad in 1515, the Ottomans attacked Jajce in vain several times, respecting the growing importance of the city. To relieve the Ottoman pressure, ban Petar Berislavić in January 1518 besieged adjacent Ottoman forts to the north and west of the city, Bočac and Jezero. Berislavić's forces consisted of 4,000 cavalry, 6,000 infantry (mostly from Croatia), and some Hungarian artillery, but they failed to capture any of the surrounding forts held by the Ottomans. They nonetheless managed to rout the Turks near Jajce and reprovision it, so the resistance continued.

== Aftermath ==
By October 1518 the town defenders again ran out of food, but managed to temporarily provide themselves by attacking and plundering unsuspecting Ottoman party which passed close to Jajce with supplies from Bočac. In the early 1519., Berislavić and his forces again pushed through to Jajce and brought fresh supplies, thus extending the garrison's lifeline for several months. Berislavić was killed in Ottoman ambush in May 1520 at Battle of Plješivica, but Croatian forces under new commanders continued to break through to besieged Jajce, such as under Krsto (Christoph) Frankapan who again successfully reprovisioned the town in June 1525. Under command of ban Petar Keglević (1521–1525) and captain Mihailo Turek, Jajce successfully repelled three more Ottoman assaults (in 1521, 1524, and 1525), but finally surrendered in 1527, after the battle of Mohacs.

== Bibliography ==
- Vojna enciklopedija (1970–76), 10 volumes, Vojno izdavački zavod Beograd, book 3, p. 798-799, article Jajce (in Serbo-Croatian)
