= Antemurale Christianitatis =

Title for Croatia bestowed by the Pope in 1519

Antemurale Christianitatis (English: Bulwark of Christendom) was a title used by the Holy See, including the Pope, to describe the frontiers of Christian Europe, defending it from the Ottoman Empire.

== Albania ==
In the 15th century Pope Pius II, admiring the Ottoman–Albanian Wars waged mainly by Skanderbeg, defined Albania as Italy's bastion of Christianity (Latin: Antemurale Christianitatis Italiaeque). The pope himself declared war on the Ottoman Empire in 1463, but such war was never fought, as the following year he died at Ancona, while still organizing the naval attack on the Ottomans.

== Armenia ==
Armenia, especially the Armenian Kingdom of Cilicia, has been described as the last Christian bulwark in Asia to fall to Muslim rule.

== Croatia ==
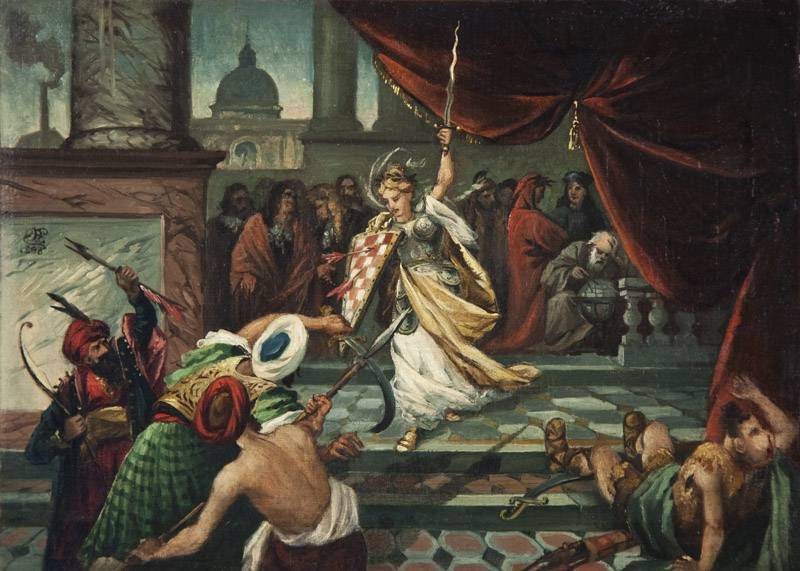
Ferdo Quiquerez, Antemurale Christianitatis (1892)-Croatia is portrayed in a form of a woman that holds a sword and a shield in the form of the Croatian coat of Arms. She stands at the entrance of Europe and guards it from the Turks. Behind her the Dome of St. Peter's Basilica and, among others, Galileo Galilei and Dante Alighieri can be seen.

Pope Leo X called Croatia the Antemurale Christianitatis (Croatian: Predziđe kršćanstva) in 1519 in a letter to the Croatian ban Petar Berislavić, given that Croatian soldiers made significant contributions in war against the Ottoman Empire. The advancement of the Ottoman Empire in Europe was stopped in 1593 on Croatian soil (Battle of Sisak), which could be in this sense regarded as a historical gate of European civilization. Nevertheless, the Muslim Ottoman Empire occupied part of Croatia from the 15th to the 19th centuries. However, Pope Leo X wasn't the first that gave Croatia such a title. The nobility of the southern Croatian regions sent a letter to Pope Alexander VI and Roman-German emperor Maximilian I on 10 April 1494 seeking help against the Ottoman attacks. In that letter Croatia was for the first time called bastion and a bulwark of Christianity:

We have been blocking this force (Turks) for almost seventeen years wasting our bodies, lives and all of our goods, and like the bastion and a bulwark of Christianity we daily defend Christian countries, as much as it is humanly possible. That is why we are telling you this: If we get defeated by the Turks, then they might be able to remove Christianity from Croats.

When Turks conquered Constantinople in 1453, Pope Callistus III urged all Christians to the Crusades. Many Croats, led by Saint John of Capistrano, were part of the army that defeated 150,000 Turks at the Siege of Belgrade in 1456. When Belgrade was conquered by the Turks in 1521 many Croatian writers and diplomats pointed out the dramatic situation by stating that Belgrade was the bastion of Christianity, the key to Europe and the fortress of the entire Kingdom of Hungary. In the following year, German Parliament in Nuremberg called Croatia Zwingermaurer (Fortress) and the Austrian Archduke Ferdinand of Habsburg said that "chivalrous Christian nation of Croats is standing as a shield in front of Styria, Carinthia and Carniola, and the whole of Central Europe and Western Christendom." At the session, Prince Bernardin Frankopan asked for help, recalling that "Croatia is a shield and door of Christianity". Krsto Frankopan stated on 1 July 1523 in the memorial to the Pope Adrian VI that Croatia is a "bulwark or door of Christianity, and especially bordering countries of Carinthia, Carniola, Istria, Friuli, and Italy".

== Greece ==
Several regions of modern Greece were also described as Antemurale Christianitatis against the Ottoman Empire. Those Greek regions were some of the few Eastern Orthodox-predominant regions that received this title.

=== Corfu ===
During Venetian rule, Corfu was described as an antemurale of Christianity. In 1646 the Venetian provveditore and captain Giacomo Donà called Corfu an "antemurale della christianità" (“bulwark of Christendom”). In 1753 Stefano Magno again described the island as an "antemurale della cristianità".

=== Crete ===
Crete, then the Kingdom of Candia, was also given the antemurale title by the Holy See. In 1634 the Venetian bailo Giovanni Cappello called the Kingdom of Candia "the bulwark of Christendom”.

=== Morea ===
In 1459 Thomas Palaiologos, Despot of the Morea, rose against the Ottomans during his conflict with his brother Demetrios Palaiologos, who was supported by the Ottomans. Thomas received 300 Italian infantrymen with the support of Bianca Maria Visconti and Pope Pius II. Historian William Miller, citing Pius II's Commentarii and Raynaldus, writes that the pope informed the rulers of Europe that "almost all the Morea had risen against the Turks" and that he described the peninsula as "the bulwark of Christendom against the infidels".

=== Rhodes ===
Rhodes, while ruled by the Knights Hospitaller, was also regarded as Antemurale Christianitatis. Together with Crete, it was given the antemurale title by the Holy See. During the Ottoman siege of 1522, Pope Adrian VI appealed to Charles V for help. Ludwig von Pastor writes that in a letter of 30 September 1522 Adrian declared that he would willingly shed his own blood to save Rhodes, which Pastor calls "this bulwark of Christendom".

== Poland–Lithuania ==
The Polish–Lithuanian Commonwealth also gained the name of Antemurale Christianitatis. In 1683 the Battle of Vienna marked a turning point in a 250-year-old struggle between the forces of Christian Europe and the Islamic Ottoman Empire. Wespazjan Kochowski in his Psalmodia polska (The Polish Psalmody, 1695) tells of the special role of Poland in the world (antemurale christianitatis – the bulwark of Christianity) and the superiority of the Polish political system (złota wolność – the golden liberty).

== Wallachia and Moldova ==
Vlad the Impaler defended his country from the Ottoman Empire and Christian diplomats were in awe of his achievements, and moreover grateful that someone was taking the initiative against the invading Muslim army. Pope Pius II himself spoke of Tepes in glowing terms after reading dispatches from his representatives, and sent subsidies from Rome to help his campaign. Te deums rang out in praise of Tepes's victories, and the inability of Mehmed's army to cross Wallachia into Central Europe saved a great many cities and countries from being conquered themselves. The Pope awarded him with the titles Athleta Christi and Antemurale Christianitatis. Stephen the Great of Moldova, Vlad's cousin, defeated the Ottomans at the Battle of Vaslui which was the biggest defeat of the Ottoman Empire in the Middle Ages. Stephen was later awarded the title "Athleta Christi" (Champion of Christ) by Pope Sixtus IV, who referred to him as "verus christianae fidei athleta" ("the true defender of the Christian faith").

== See also ==
- Holy League (1538)
- Holy League (1571)
- Holy League (1684)
- Holy League (1717)
- Christ of Europe
- Hundred Years' Croatian–Ottoman War
