= Hundred Years' Croatian–Ottoman War =

Sequence of conflicts between the Ottoman Empire and Kingdom of Croatia from 1493 to 1593

- Part of the Croatian–Ottoman wars, Hungarian–Ottoman Wars, Ottoman–Habsburg wars and the Ottoman wars in Europe
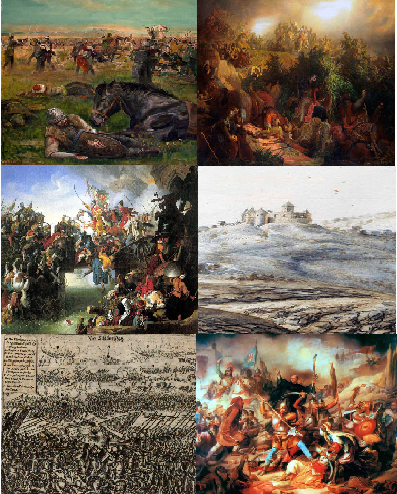
- Clockwise, From top left: The Battle of Krbava Field, The Battle of Mohács, The Siege of Szigetvár, The Siege of Gvozdansko The Battle of Slunj, The Battle of Sisak
Date	1493 to 1593 (100 years) or 2nd half of the 15th century to 1606
Location	Medieval Kingdom of Croatia, Habsburg Kingdom of Croatia
Result	Indecisive

Belligerents
Until 1526: Kingdom of Croatia; Kingdom of Hungary	Until 1526: Ottoman Empire
From 1527: Habsburg Monarchy; Kingdom of Croatia; Kingdom of Hungary; Duchy of Carniola; Serbian Despotate	From 1527: Ottoman Empire: Eyalet of Bosnia; Budin Eyalet

Commanders and leaders
Emerik Derenčin (executed); Ivan Frankopan Cetinski †; Bernardin Frankopan; Ivan Karlović; Petar Berislavić †; Petar Kružić †; Krsto Frankopan (DOW); Johann Katzianer (executed); Nikola Jurišić; Nikola IV Zrinski †; Ivan Lenković (DOW); Tamás Erdődy; Vid Halek; Ruprecht von Eggenberg; Andreas von Auersperg; Herbard VIII von Auersperg †; Pavle Bakić †	(Ottoman Empire) Suleiman the Magnificent; (Ottoman Empire) Sokollu Mehmed Pasha; (Ottoman Empire) Koca Sinan Pasha; (Ottoman Empire) Gazi Husrev Bey; (Ottoman Empire) Malkoçoğlu Bali Bey; (Ottoman Empire) Telli Hasan Pasha †; (Ottoman Empire) Hadım Jakup Pasha of Bosnia

The Hundred Years' Croatian–Ottoman War (Croatian: Stogodišnji hrvatsko-turski rat, Stogodišnji rat protiv Turaka, Stogodišnji rat s Osmanlijama) was a sequence of conflicts, mostly of relatively low intensity, between the Ottoman Empire and the medieval Kingdom of Croatia (ruled by the Jagiellon and Zápolya dynasties), and the later Habsburg Kingdom of Croatia. Besides periods of small-scale borderland warfare, the conflict also saw episodes of major conquest campaigns of Croatian land which was undertaken by the Ottomans especially during the 16th century.

The expansion of the Ottoman Empire in Europe was stopped in the Battle of Sisak 1593. Nevertheless, the Ottoman Empire held control over parts of Croatia from the 16th to the end of the 17th century, when most of the territories were regained in the Great Turkish War, except for lands known as Turkish Croatia (roughly corresponding to modern day western Bosnia and Herzegovina) which remained in Ottoman hands until the 19th century.

== Time span ==
There are several different variations about the exact length of the war. According to one group of historians, the war began with the Battle of Krbava Field in 1493, and ended with the Battle of Sisak in 1593. According to the other group of historians, the war lasted from the second half of the 15th century and into the entire 16th century. A third group of historians mark the Peace of Zsitvatorok in 1606 as the end of the war. By the end of war, Croatia was reduced to "Remnants of the Remnants" and its territory consisted of only 16,800 km^{2}.

In light of the human and territorial loss, the 15th and 16th centuries were known as the "Two centuries of Croatia in mourning" (Latin: Plorantis Croatiae saecula duo carmine descripta) in the lyric-epic poem of Pavao Ritter Vitezović from 1703.

== Background ==
By the mid 14th century, the Ottoman Empire established a foothold in Europe around the town of Gallipoli. From there, they expanded into the Bulgarian Empire and encircled Byzantine capital Constantinople. In 1361, the Ottomans captured Adrianople and proclaimed it their capital. Most of Moravian Serbia fell under Ottoman control following the battle of Kosovo in 1389, while Bulgaria was captured in 1396. The Serbian Despotate became an Ottoman vassal. These conquests opened the way further west and allowed the Ottomans to reach the Kingdom of Bosnia, as well as the Kingdom of Croatia and the Kingdom of Hungary. Croatia and Hungary were since 1102 in a personal union, with the territory of Croatia governed by a royal dignitary (ban). The medieval Kingdom of Slavonia was governed by a separate ban, and was not a part of the royal title. Sigismund, the king of Hungary and Croatia, led the crusade of Nicopolis against the Ottoman Empire in 1396, which resulted in the rout of the Christian army. He then turned to the strengthening of border areas in his realm. Sigismund's rule was marked with dynastic struggles. Venice took advantage of this and between 1409 and 1420 established control over Dalmatia.

The fall of Constantinople in 1453 enabled the Ottoman Empire to engage more troops in their Balkan campaigns. Bosnia was conquered by Sultan Mehmed II in May 1463, after the capture of Bobovac and the execution of Stephen Tomašević, the last Bosnian king. Ottoman forces then raided the neighbouring Croatia and Venetian Dalmatia. The valleys of the Sana and Una rivers were successfully defended by Croatian Ban Pavao Špirančić during the summer of 1463. The Ottomans then directed their incursions to the south, on the Croatian region of Krbava and around the coastal town of Senj. Špirančić was captured in battle in September and died in captivity.

King Matthias Corvinus waited until most of the Ottoman troops left the region. In the fall of 1463, Corvinus led an army and captured parts of northern Bosnia and towns along the Vrbas and Usora rivers, including the fortress of Jajce in December, after a three month siege. Croatian Ban Stephen III Frankopan took part in Corvinus's campaign. Sultan Mehmed did not immediately respond to the offensive. He established the Sanjak of Bosnia on the territory of the former Bosnian Kingdom, which became the starting point of Ottoman raids into Croatia. Corvinus appointed Slavonian nobleman Emeric Zápolya as the governor of Bosnia, in order to organize the defense.

In 1464, Mehmed gathered an army to recapture the lost territories. He arrived to Bosnia in June and began a month-long siege of Jajce, but the garrison withheld the attack. Corvinus led an offensive into northeastern Bosnia and along the Drina River, and captured Srebrenik.

=== Ottoman style of warfare ===
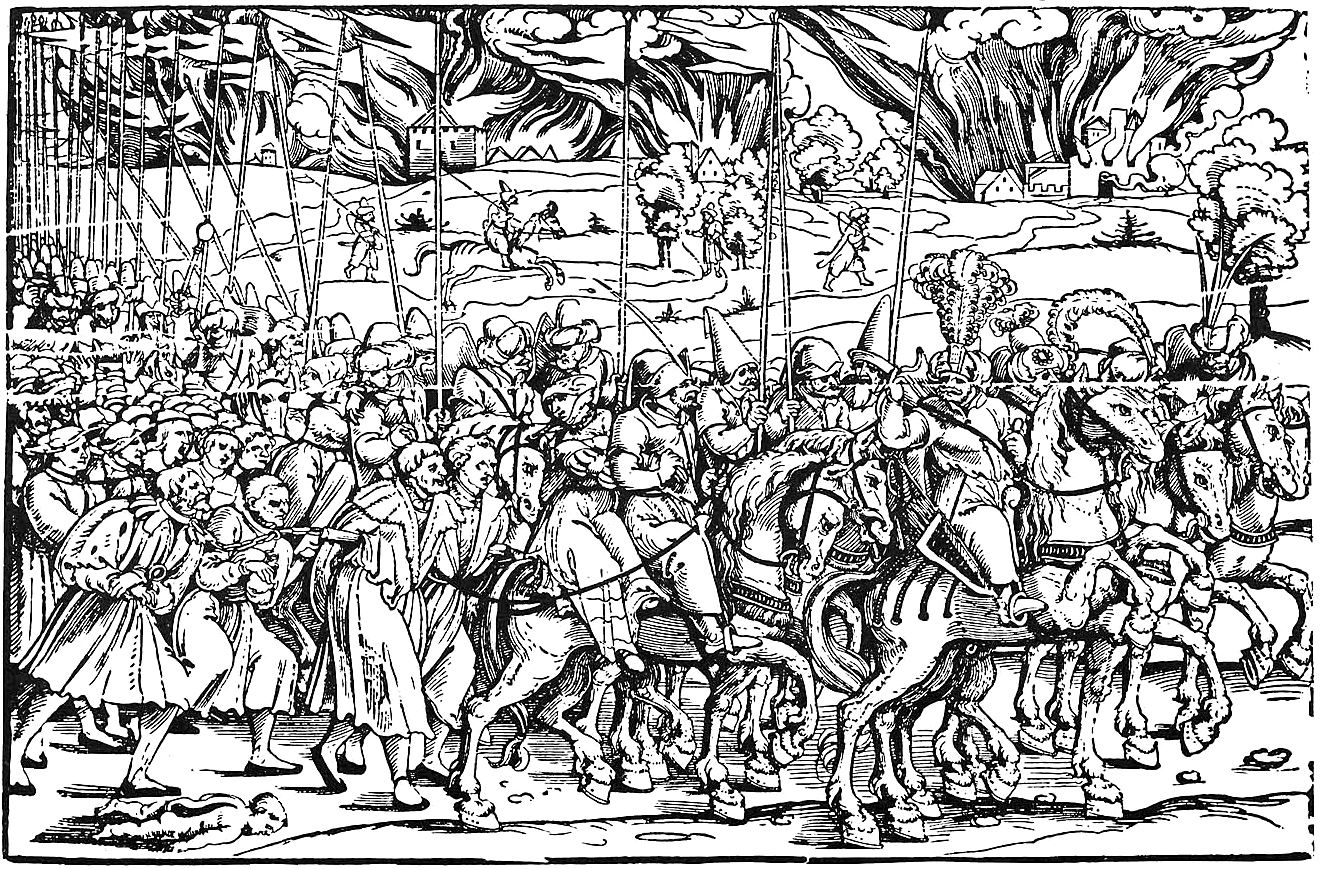
Otoman troops taking enslaved Christian captives.

The usual Ottoman tactic consisted of persistent loot and scorching raids usually conducted by the irregular light cavalry called the akinjis. The aim of these raids, (somewhat similar to the chevauchées conducted during the Hundred Years War) was to intimidate and demoralize the local civil inhabitants, to exhaust the economic opportunities and disable the normal economic life on the frontier areas, which would soften up the enemy defense. The tactic was also known as the "little war" (German: Kleinkrieg). The regions of Krbava and Lika were initially the main targets of Ottoman raids, regularly led by local sanjak-beys. The mountains and forests of medieval Croatia provided cover for Ottoman raiding parties, enabling them to remain longer on Croatian territory. Later, the duchies of Carniola, Styria, and Carinthia, the County of Gorizia, and Venetian-held territories were targeted by these raids as well.

On the other side, Croatian and allied Christian forces implemented counterattacks, especially in the first phases of war, when they were still able to apply the counterattacking or the offensive tactics. Even though akinji raiding parties attempted to evade hostile military formations, the armies did sometimes clash. Sometimes the local armies intercepted or pursued the raiders on their return. At that point the presence of captives which akinjis would capture as well as the heavy booty which they carried back made their return more slow and therefore vulnerable to the enemy attack such as at Battle of Una in 1483. The captives captured in these raids were usually sold as slaves on the Ottoman slave markets.

==== Zones of war peril ====
According to Croatian historian Ivan Jurković, danger zones affected by possible akinji raids could be graded in three levels:

- The first zone was the territory of Kingdom of Croatia, that had no effective control by both sides, as well as the parts of Kingdom of Croatia that were heavily struck by the Ottoman military and paramilitary operations. This zone was up to 50 km deep in the Croatian territory. It mostly covered the areas along the border and the later-formed Military Frontier. The infrastructure and the supra-structure became ruined and devastated, and the economic life suffered. This zone had high rate of emigration, mostly to the second and the third zones, along with emigrations abroad.
- The second zone was from time to time exposed to the raids of the Ottoman regular and irregular forces. The area was controlled by the Croatian authorities and the economic life was still somewhat functioning. Population level was steady and received a continuous inflow of displacees from the first zone. The Croatian nobles used this zone as the support point and the base for the defense or for the attempts of retaking of their estates in the first zone. These areas lived as economic support of the armies.
- The third zone was mostly an Ottoman raid-safe zone, in which the majority of the zone had no Ottoman raids, although few areas were subjected to Ottoman raids.

== Croatia in personal union with Hungary ==
=== Early confrontations ===
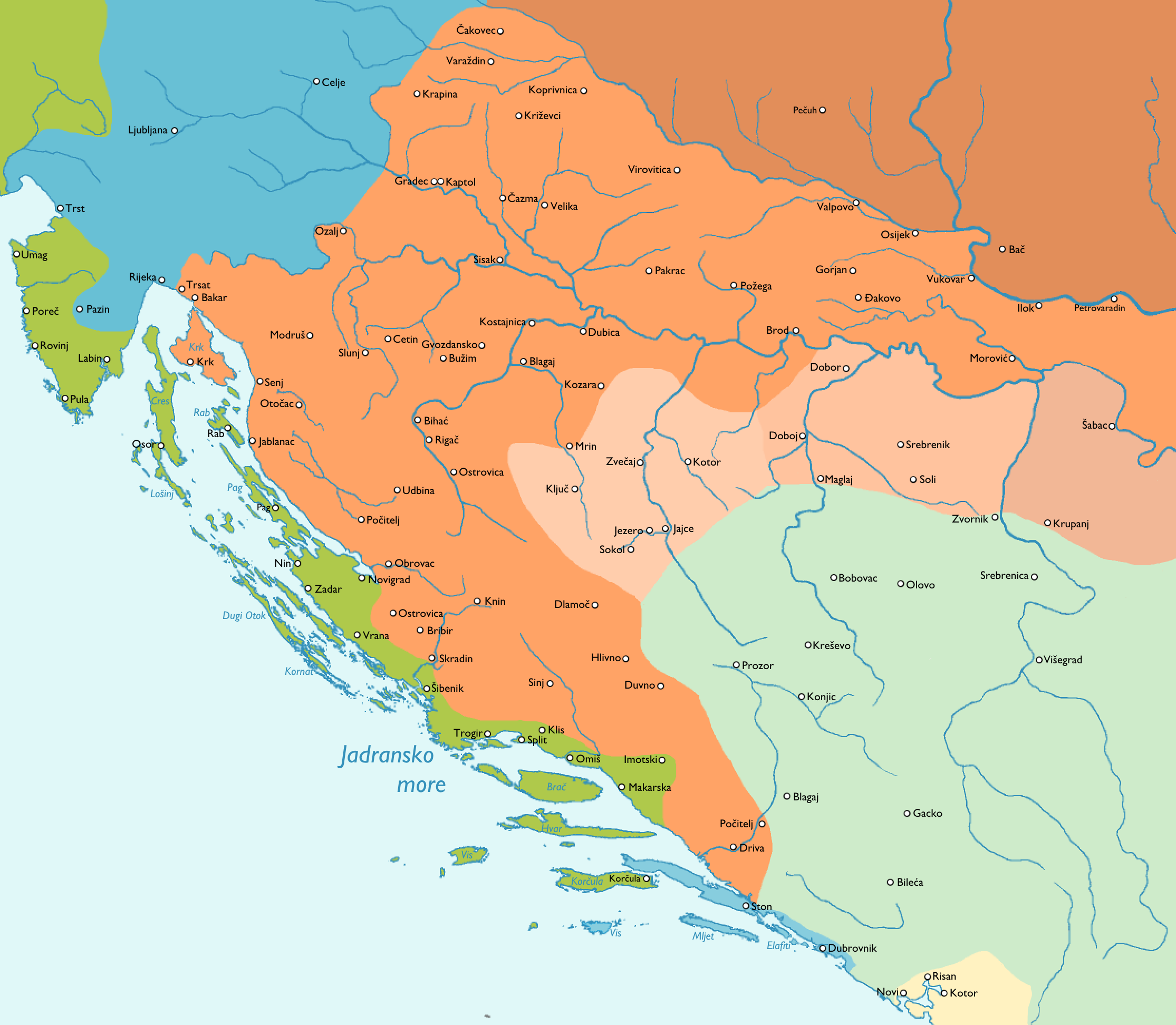
Hungarian and Croatian king Matthias Corvinus formed two defensive provinces called "banates" following the fall of Bosnia and his recapture of Jajce fortress in 1463. The purpose of Banate of Jajce was defense of Croatia against the Ottoman incursions. The Jajce banate is shown in bright orange color on the map.

In the aftermath of fall of medieval Kingdom of Bosnia to the Ottomans in 1463, Hungarian king Matthias Corvinus established the banates of Jajce and Srebrenik, which formed the centre of his new defense system. While it faced difficulties with coordination and finances, the system provided protection for northern Croatia, Slavonia, and southern Hungary from Ottoman raids, but the Adriatic coast and southern Croatia were still exposed. The fortresses of Knin, Klis, and Skradin formed the main line of defense in Croatia, while Krupa, Bihać, Otočac, and Senj formed the rear line. Later in 1469, the Captaincy of Senj was formed as a military and administrative unit within the defense system. In 1467, Ottoman akinjis plundered the surroundings of Zadar and Šibenik. This happened again in 1468 and 1469, along with raids around Senj and across the Kupa River into the Duchy of Carniola. Another raid to southern Croatia followed up in June 1469, when several thousand people were taken captive. Estates of the Frankopan and Kurjaković families were particularly affected by these Ottoman raids. The Frankopans were also struck by Corvinus's centralization measures, and were deprived of Senj and several other possessions.

In the wake of the conquest of Bosnia, the Ottomans also expanded on most of the lands of Stjepan Vukčić Kosača by 1465. The town of Mostar was captured in 1466. In this area, the Ottoman Sanjak of Herzegovina was established in 1470.

The military of the Croatian Kingdom was based on a banderial system, involving soldiers on the ban's payroll and those of the magnates and the nobles. Due to the maintenance costs and the mountainous terrain of Croatia, the infantry significantly outnumbered the cavalry. Units of the middle and lower nobility presented the most numerous component of the Croatian armed force. These armies lacked the mobility as members of the noble families were tied to their often scattered holdings, which were vulnerable to akinji attacks. The Croatian nobles raised their troops at the request of their counts or the head of the county (župan). Such a mobilization system was slow and unable to react in time to prevent an incursion from the fast Ottoman light cavalry. Although incursions of Ottoman akinjis were usually successful, the forces of the Croatian ban and local nobles sometimes intercepted these raiding groups on their way back to Ottoman-held territory. In 1475 and 1478, the counts of the Zrinski family ambushed Ottoman troops returning from a raid and defeated them in the Una Valley.

In 1476, for the sake of better military organization, the office of the Ban of Croatia was merged with that of the Ban of Slavonia, which contributed to the process of political integration between Croatia and Slavonia. Despite everything mentioned earlier, the Ottoman danger did not stop internal conflicts between Croatian and Slavonian nobility, which further undermined an efficient defense.

=== Battle of Krbava ===
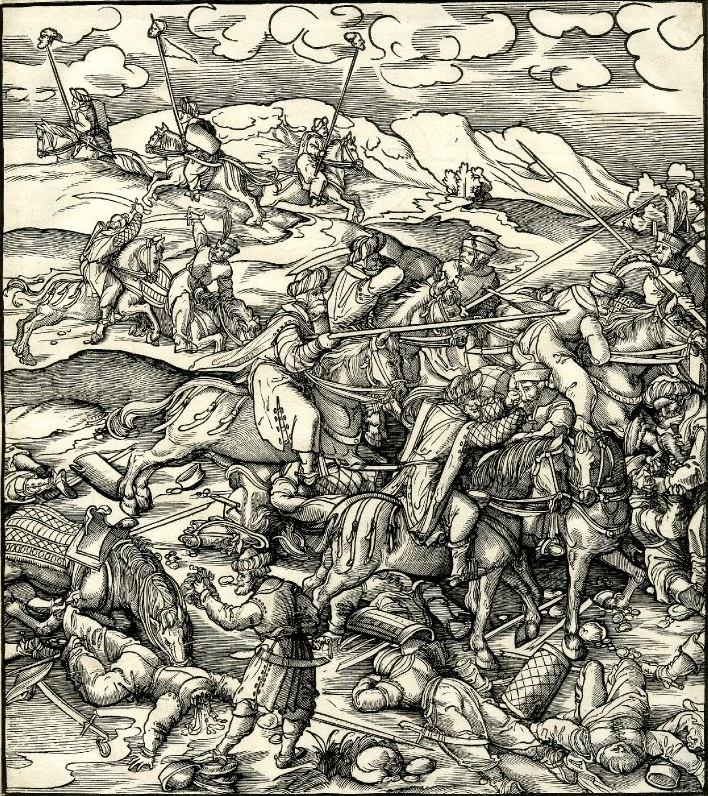
Battle of Krbava Field in 1493

Incursions continued under Sultan Bayezid II, but with less intensity than in the 1470s. The Ottomans captured Herceg Novi in 1482, completing the conquest of Kosača's realm. In 1483, an army led by Croatian Ban Matthias Geréb destroyed the Ottoman raiding party in the Battle of Una near Novi Grad. A seven-year peace treaty between Bayezid and Corvinus was signed later in the year. By that time, the constant warfare left many villages deserted, and almost completely stopped the major trade route between Senj and Zagreb and inward towards Hungary. Corvinus died in 1490 and was succeeded by Vladislaus II. As the peace treaty came to an end, the hostilities renewed. In 1491, Croatian forces defeated another Ottoman raiding group returning from Carniola in the battle of Vrpile Gulch in Lika. This defeat forced the Ottomans to halt their attacks during the following year.

As Frankopans attempted to regain control over the town of Senj in July 1493, which was taken from them earlier by the king Matthias Corvinus in order to create Senj Captaincy (part of his defensive system) their efforts led to the conflict with Croatian Ban Emerik Derenčin resulting in Siege of Sokolac. As this was taking place, news of another Ottoman raiding party returning through Croatia towards Bosnia in August, forced them to quickly conclude truce and quit the siege. Derenčin gathered an army consisting of a number of Croatian nobles and their units and attempted to block the Ottoman path back to Bosnia. He decided to face the Ottoman army in an open battle, although Croatian nobles unsuccessfully insisted that making an ambush in the mountains would be a better option. On 9 September, the Croatian army clashed with the Ottoman forces near Udbina in Lika and suffered a huge defeat in the battle of Krbava Field. Ottoman strategy and tactics employed in this battle proved superior to that of the Croatian side. While the outcome of the battle was not immediately felt, it accelerated the decline of the power of the nobility, particularly the lower and the middle nobles.

=== Croatian nobility left to themselves ===
In 1503, Hungarian king Vladislaus II concluded a seven-year peace treaty with Sultan Bayezid. The Ottoman Empire kept the strategically important fortified towns of Kamengrad and Ključ, which separated the Banate of Jajce from Croatia. The treaty was renewed in 1511, but with the accession of new sultan Selim I on the Ottoman throne in 1512, all peace treaties were annulled. The Banate of Srebrenik was captured by the Ottomans in the autumn of the same year.

Meanwhile, in Croatia, ban Petar Berislavić continued defending the country against the Ottomans. In 1513, he scored a major victory at the battle of Dubica on the Una river. He also took part in the 1518 battle of Jajce, but was ultimately killed in an Ottoman ambush at the battle of Plješevica in 1520.

After Berislavić's death, king Louis II failed to appoint a new ban for Croatia, while Venetian diplomats in Budim court even heard him saying that "Croatia means nothing to him.” Croatian nobility informed of this started negotiating with the Ottomans about becoming their vassal and paying tribute.

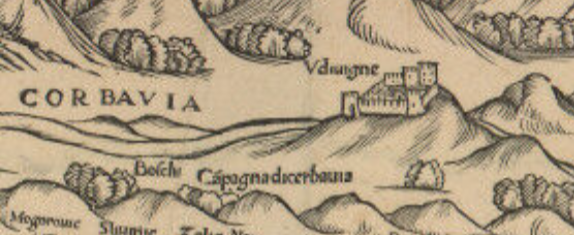
Udbina Castle, seat of Croatian ban Ivan Karlović, as it was in around 1530. Depiction from Venetian cartographer Matteo Pagano.

Finally, as Belgrade fell to the Ottomans in 1521, king Louis appointed Ivan Karlović ban of Croatia. Karlović previously served as Venetian Condottiero since by defending his possessions in Croatia, he also defended Venetian lands from the Ottoman incursions. He therefore financed defense of Croatia with Venetian money. Since he had no use of Hungarian king, Karlović also established contacts with Ferdinand Habsburg who provided some troops for the defense of Croatia. His support was limited, as inner-Austrian duchies opposed the permanent stationing of their troops outside the borders of the Holy Roman Empire. Ferdinand nonetheless managed to extend his influence in Croatia.In May 1522, after two previous attempts in 1513 and 1514, Bosnian sanjak-bey Gazi Husrev-beg besieged Knin, the old capital of Croatia. Although Karlović was preparing a relief force, the commander of the Knin garrison Mihajlo Vojković surrendered the fortress. A few days later, Skradin surrendered as well. The loss of Knin gave more momentum to the Ottoman advance, while leading role of Croatia's defenses south of the Sava River fell to Bihać. Following the fall of Knin and Skradin, Habsburg supreme military commander Nicholas, Count of Salm arrived to Croatia to consult with Karlović about further defense from the Ottomans. Karlović resigned from his position as Croatian ban in 1524 because the permanent state of war against the Ottomans caused all of his possessions to get ravaged, which impoverished him severely. At the same time the weak king of Hungary (which Croatia was formally part of) provided him with no help whatsoever.

=== Interregnum period ===
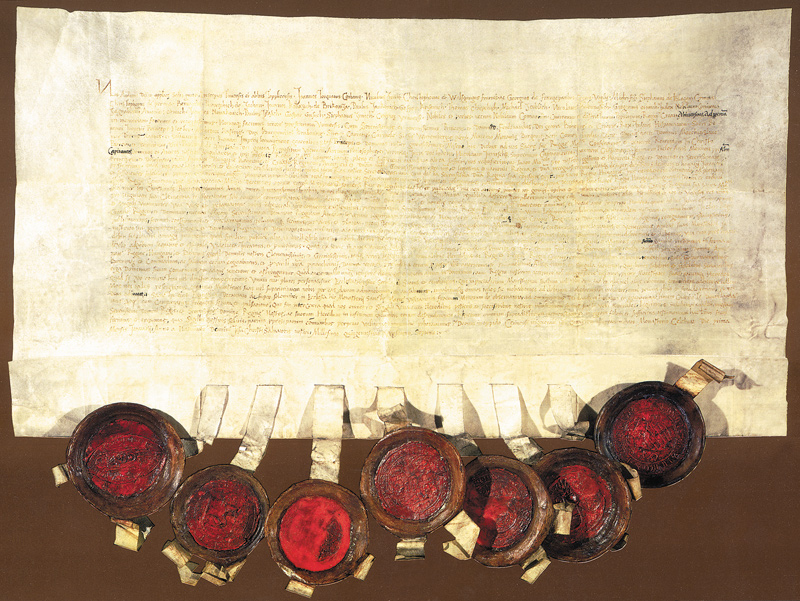
The Cetin Charter from 1 January 1527 which confirmed the election of Ferdinand Habsburg as king of Croatia. The charter shows seals of the most distinguished Croatian nobles as well as the seal of Croatia.

In 1526, Ottoman forces led by Sultan Suleiman the Magnificent decisively defeated a Hungarian army led by King Louis II at the battle of Mohács, which led to the collapse of the Kingdom of Hungary. Louis, who had no heir, died in battle. In the ensuing interregnum Croatia and Hungary became disputed territories between Ferdinand I of the House of Habsburg, and John Zápolya, Voivode of Transylvania. Most of the Croatian nobles backed Ferdinand. On 1 January 1527, the Croatian Parliament assembled in Cetingrad and unanimously elected Ferdinand as King of Croatia.

Although on election of Cetin, Ferdinand Habsburg pledged to provide both financial and military aid to Croatian nobility who elected him, in reality he soon turned out to be unable to fully keep his promises. Croatian nobility continuously asked him to invest in both reconstruction of fortifications on the borderlands towards the Ottoman Empire and send actual troops to man them. They usually argued that by defending Croatia, Ferdinand actually defended the Holy Roman Empire from the Ottoman incursions. At one point Croatians even pointed to the possibility of switching sides and actually allowing Ottoman armies to freely pass through Croatia in order to attack the Holy Roman Empire. Ferdinand, however, who firstly invested most of his forces in civil war against Zapolya, could only offer limited help before the civil war with Zapolya was resolved.

== Habsburg period ==
=== Ottoman advances during interregnum ===
As the civil war for the Hungarian crown between Ferdinand Habsburg and John Zapolya raged, the Ottomans used the instabilities to further capture Croatian forts in Obrovac, Udbina, Komić and Mrsinj, by which they asserted their control over the entire Krbava county and made ground for further advances to Lika. By April 1529, the ban of Croatia Ivan Karlović wrote in his letters that the Ottoman cavalry had overrun Lika and Krbava, making them a staging ground for further attacks on Croatia and Carniola two years later.

Jajce fell in 1528, Požega in 1536, Klis fell in 1537, Nadin and Vrana in 1538, moving the Croatian-Ottoman border to the line, roughly, Požega-Bihać-Velebit-Zrmanja-Cetina.

=== Katzianer's Campaign ===
A map of 1537 Katzianer's Campaign.

In 1537, after prevailing over Zapolya in Civil War and as a result of continuous pressure from the Croatian nobility, Ferdinand Habsburg named one of his seasoned commanders Johann Katzianer as supreme royal captain "of our Slavonian kingdom" on joint Croatian-Slavonian parliament held in Križevci in spring of 1537. This Croatian-Slavonian parliament proclaimed the general insurrection. Bishop of Zagreb Simon Erdody was in charge of the logistics of the upcoming campaign. The same parliament, however, refused to confirm Katzianer as supreme commander, which left this important matter unresolved before the launch of the offensive. An army of 24,000 men assembled near Koprivnica and marched off to Slavonia in order to chase away the Ottomans, with their main objective being the town of Osijek. As the Habsburg army reached Virovitica, the conflicts between different commanders inflamed, and the army ran out of food. The autumn rains also caused maladies among soldiers, which decimated the army. As the Osijek garrison was reinforced by Mehmed-beg Jahjapašić and thus became too strong to besiege it regularly, Katzianer ordered a withdrawal. His army was intercepted by the Turks and eventually ended up near Gorjani. Top commanders such as Katzianer and bishop Erdodoy escaped a night before the battle, while what remained of Katzianer's army was completely destroyed by the Ottomans in the Battle of Gorjani on 9 October 1537.

=== Military Frontier ===
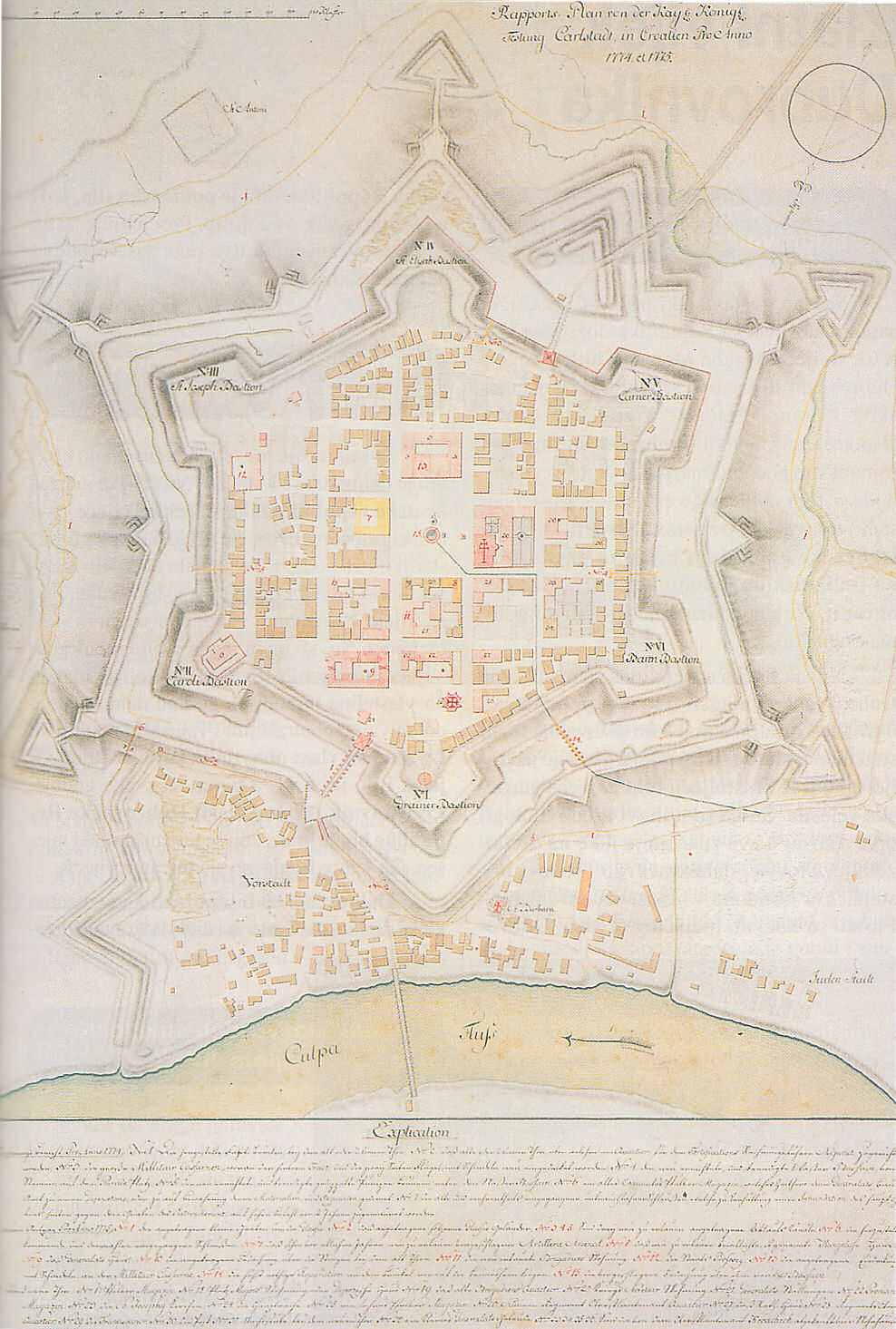
A town of Karlovac was founded in 2nd half of the 16th century, to serve as a strongpoint in defense against the Ottomans. This picture shows Karlovac star shaped renaissance fort.

The fiasco of Katzianer's Campaign marked a turning point and convinced both the Habsburg king and the Croatian-Slavonian nobility to turn to the creation of a defensive buffer zone which would rely on a system of fortifications in the borderlands. The old medieval fortifications in the area had to be reinforced and reconstructed in accordance with contemporary renaissance standards. Likewise, the armies confronting the Ottomans had to be united under a joint command in order to avoid discord among the commanders. The defensive system also had to be permanently and systematically well financed. This led to the creation of a Military Frontier. This buffer zone back in the 16th century was divided into smaller captaincies. Several similar captaincies formed a Frontier, for example in the area adjacent to Ottoman Slavonia the Slavonian Frontier. The Slavonian Frontier was further stretched to form a continuation with the Croatian Frontier whose center from 1579 was the newly built town of Karlovac. Carinthian, Carniolan and Styrian nobility agreed to partially finance the Military Frontier in order to hold off the Ottomans in Croatia/Slavonia and therefore prevent them from invading their own lands. Financially exhausted Croatian nobility sometimes gave their forts to Styrian/Carniolan counterparts as they had no money to maintain and defend them. The area between Bović and Brkiševina was financed by the ban of Croatia and was therefore called Ban's Frontier (Banska krajina), subsequently called "Banovina" or "Banija". Unlike the rest of the Military Frontier whose defense was a responsibility of Habsburg Military Authorities, the defense of Ban's Frontier fell under the responsibility of Croatia.

Besides the regular garrisons in forts of the Military Frontier, troops were also deployed in smaller square shaped wooden palisades with four defensive towers on its corners designed to protect local villagers during the Ottoman incursions. There were also high observation posts manned with guards, between the aforementioned smaller forts. In case of the enemy attack, the guard on the observation post would alert friendly troops about the approaching enemies by either firing from a gun or by igniting fire. Such organized service enabled swift mobilization in case of the Ottoman incursion.

In January 1539, King Ferdinand deployed the army of 3,000-4,000 Spanish mercenaries to Slavonia to man the fortifications, while Nikola Jurišić was named supreme royal captain in Slavonia in the aftermath of Katzianer's downfall. He also invited nobility of the Croatian-Slavonian parliament to properly supply this newly arrived Spanish army with food and salaries.

The Croatian-Slavonian parliament also decided to recruit a 300 strong haramija force in order to counter frequent Ottoman martolos raids. The arrival of the Spanish army in Slavonia temporarily halted the Ottoman conquests, so in 1539 and 1540 there were no major territorial losses in Slavonia.Continuous incursions by Ottoman akinjis across the temporary border, aimed at plundering Croatian territories, were frequent, leading to battles such as the Battle of Otočac (1543) and the Battle of Konjščina (1545).

By the end of 1540, the Ottoman Empire occupied the Croatian possessions between Skradin and Karin, eliminating them as a buffer zone between the Ottoman and Venetian territory in Dalmatia. By 1573, the remainder of the Dalmatian hinterland, now largely controlled by the Venetian cities, was even further reduced by Ottoman advances. In 1580, the Ottoman Empire formed Bosnia Eyalet (pashaluk) by uniting Bosnian, Herzegovina, Lika, Pakrac, Zvornik and Požega sanjaks while also adding it Prizren and Vučitrn sanjak. They therefore created a large province under control of Bosnian pasha which also incorporated conquered Croatian lands.

=== The Great Offensive of Hasan Pasha ===
Map of Croatia (orange) and Ottoman expansion at the beginning of 1576

In 1590, Ottoman Empire concluded a peace treaty with Safavid Persian Empire. Although, sultan Murad III himself favoured retaining peace and even signed new eight-year-long peace with Habsburgs in 1591, his grand vizier Koca Sinan Pasha preferred continuing the war on Ottoman western borders. Koca Sinan Pasha therefore urged newly appointed governor of Bosnian Eyalet Telil Hasan Pasha, to start provocations on Croatian border in order to provoke Croatian response and thereby convince his Emperor to go to war in Europe.

Same year in spring, Ottomans constructed pontoon bridges over Sava river near Gradiška and started amassing troops in Banja Luka. In 1591 Croatian Sabor in Zagreb intelligence report came that Hasan Pasha mobilised troops from all sanjaks under his authority and is about to launch an attack on one of Croatian bordertown forts. Croatian Sabor in response proclaimed general insurrection throughout entire country.

In August 1591, Hasan Pasha's army crossed Sava river and marched off towards fort of Sisak. Various sources describe his army between 35 000–16 000 strong. He besieged the fort leading to First battle of Sisak. The Ottomans couldn't capture the fort, so they retreated back to Gradiška on August 11. Army of Slavonian Frontier and Croatian ban responded by besieging Moslavina fort and forced its garrison to surrender. In autumn same year, Hasan Pasha responded by sending a raiding party of some 5000 horsemen on a plundering raid to Slavonian military Frontier, but his raiding party was intercepted and partially destroyed by local Christian captains. On 6 November 1591, the Ottomans successfully captured the fort of Ripač.

In 1592, Ottomans resumed their offensives against Croatia and managed to besiege and capture town of Bihać in June 1592. One month later, further warfare led to Battle of Brest which also ended in decisive Ottoman victory. The Christian defeat near Brest, however, raised an alarm through much of the Habsburg Monarchy so Christian armies started flowing in to Croatia from all over Europe. The decisive battle took place in June 1593 when Hasan Pasha attempted to capture Sisak fort for the third time and it ended in decisive Christian victory. Hasan Pasha himself got killed in the battle. Soon after, much of the Christian reinforcements returned home.

Meanwhile, as news of Ottoman defeat near Sisak reached Constantinople, sultan Murad III got angered by hearing the news. He therefore decided to declare war on Habsburgs, launching a Long Turkish War.

== Aftermath ==
=== Battle of Sisak ===
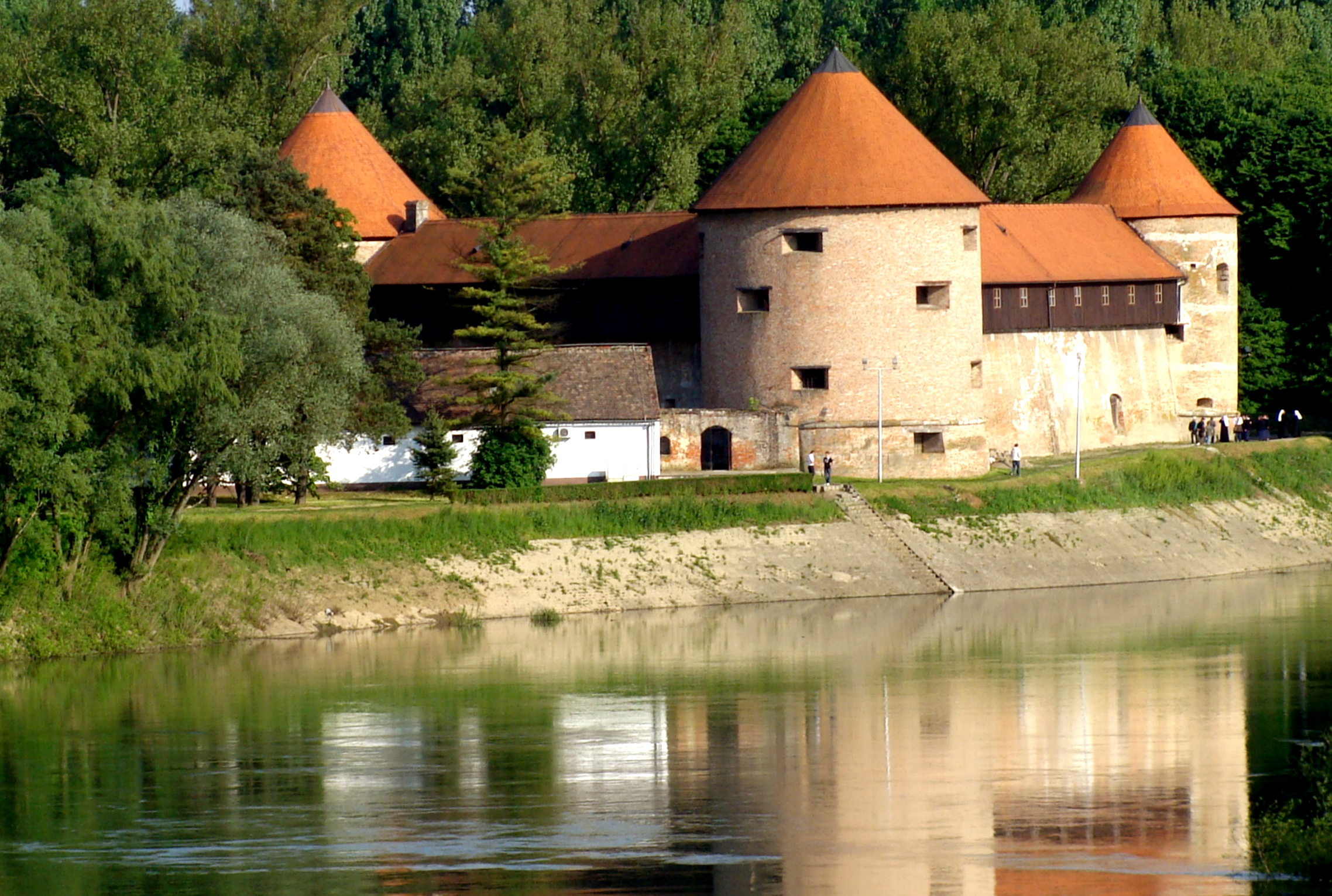
Sisak fort, where final battles of Hundred Years' Croatian–Ottoman War took place.

On 15 June 1593, Sisak was once again besieged by the Bosnian Pasha and his Gazis. The Sisak garrison was commanded by Blaž Đurak and Matija Fintić, both Croatian priests from the Diocese of Zagreb. A Habsburg relief army under the supreme command of the Styrian general Ruprecht von Eggenberg, was quickly assembled to break the siege. The Croatian troops were led by the Ban of Croatia, Tamás Erdődy, while major forces from the Duchy of Carniola and the Duchy of Carinthia were under the commander of the Croatian Military Frontier Andreas von Auersperg, known as the "Carniolan Achilles". On 22 June, the Austro-Croatian relief army launched a surprise attack on the besieging forces, and at the same time the garrison came out of the fortress to join the attack; the ensuing battle resulted in a crushing defeat for the Bosnian Ottoman army, with Hasan Pasha being killed in action and almost all of his army being wiped out. The battle of Sisak is considered the main catalyst for the start of the Long War which raged between the Habsburgs and the Ottomans from 1593 to 1606.

=== Evaluation ===
Even though the Ottoman defeat near Sisak in June triggered the start of Long Turkish War, by the end of it, the Habsburgs managed to achieve a rather favourable peace treaty in 1606. According to Croatian historian and turkologist Nenad Moačanin, the failure of Hasan Pasha's offensive and his death near Sisak ushered in the period of the 17th century which was characterized by relative stability of Croatian-Ottoman border. Due to internal problems it faced (mutinies, inflation, crisis of timar system), the Ottoman Empire lost the offensive potential it used to have, so instead of making further offensive attempts against Croatia, the Ottoman Empire started bolstering its defences along the borderline with Croatian lands thus taking a more defensive posture.

Although the Croatian Kingdom suffered major defeats in battles, it remained in existence, keeping its identity, religion, and culture under the Habsburg monarchy.

== International impact ==
Croatian struggle against the Ottomans did not remain unnoticed in the political circles of European states. Copious amounts of information from the war was written in Monumenta Hungariae Historica, Codex diplomaticus partium Regno Hungariae adnexarum from 1903 (over 600 documents).

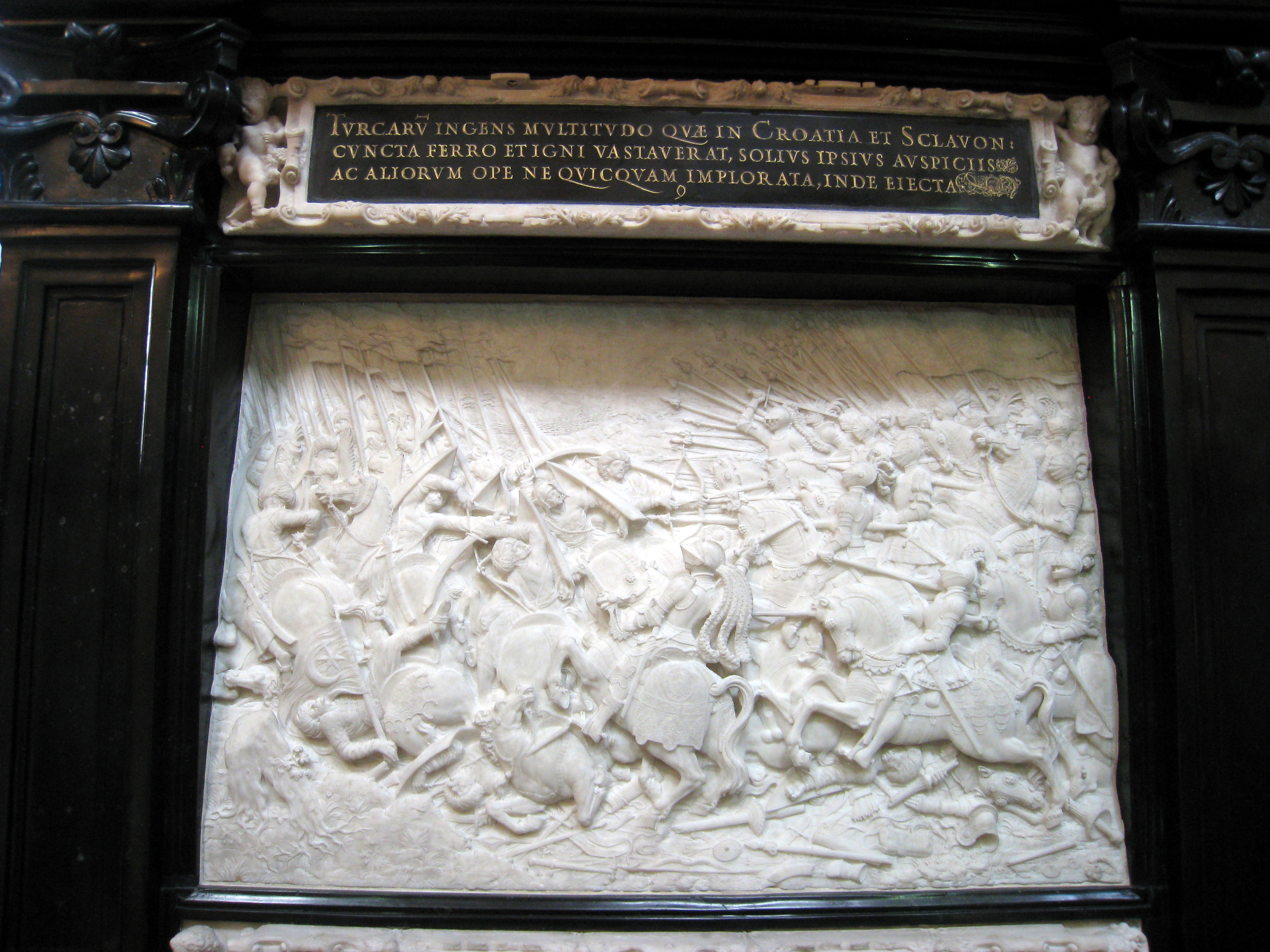
Depiction of a battle between Croatians and Ottomans on cenotaph of Maximilian I, Holy Roman Emperor, in Innsbruck.

Croatian 1493 defeat in Battle of Krbava Field was recorded by Czech traveller Jan Hasištejnský z Lobkovic during his stay in Zadar. Hašištensky described the sorrow and misery among the Croats in the aftermath of the battle. The news of the Croatian defeat on Krbava also reached the Windsor court of English king Henry VII Tudor, after being informed by the pope Alexander VI in one letter. In his response, Henry VII referred to the news as "very distressing". The news of Krbava defeat also spread throughout German speaking lands and in 1493 the pamphlet about the battle was printed in Vienna. The Ottoman attacks on Croatia were also discussed on German imperial diet (Reichstag). Pope Leo X called Croatia the Antemurale Christianitatis ("Bulwark of Christianity") in 1519, since Croatians made significant contributions to the struggle of Christian Europe against the Muslim Turks.

In 1522, Croatian nobleman Bernardin Frankopan held his famous series of Latin speeches called "Oratio pro Croatia" (A speech for Croatia) on German Imperial Diet of Nuremberg. In his speeches, Frankopan asked Germans for help against "the common enemy of our holy faith" and asked for more help from the West.

In the aftermath of Third battle of Sisak in 1593, pope Clement VIII commended both Andreas von Auersperg and Croatian ban Erdődy for their roles in the battle. Spanish king Phillip II named Erdődy knight of Order of San Salvador and sent him golden pearled chain with coat of arms of the order.

== See also ==
- Great Turkish War
- Croatian-Slavonian-Dalmatian theater in Great Turkish War
- Croatian-Slovene peasant revolt - a major peasant revolt occurred during Hundred Years' Croatian–Ottoman War.
