= Holy League (1717) =

Anti-Ottoman alliance

The Holy League of 1717 was one of many coalitions organised by the Papal States to deal with the Ottoman threat. This last one comprised Portugal, the Republic of Venice and Malta.

== Background ==
Throughout the 16th and 17th centuries, several Holy Leagues were organized by the Papacy, the most famous of which finally managed to defeat the Ottoman fleet at the third Battle of Lepanto. However, the resurgent threat of the Ottoman fleet continued until the early 18th century and came again to the fore in the Seventh Ottoman–Venetian War of 1714–1718.

As with the previous Leagues, the Papal States organized the expedition, the Republic of Venice financed it and a third party - usually a Catholic kingdom - was to provide the support to the fleet. Given that Spain was exhausted from the War of the Spanish Succession, Pope Clement XI appealed to King John V of Portugal who ended up sending a fleet to the Mediterranean.

The efforts came to fruition in late July, when a combined fleet of Portuguese, Venetian, Papal, and Maltese ships engaged the fleet of Kapudan Pasha Eğribozlu İbrahim Pasha in the Battle of Matapan.

== Aftermath ==
The outcome of 1717 as well as of the prior battles with the same goal, was that of restricting the Ottoman naval dominance to the eastern Mediterranean.

As a result of the battle, the Venetian attempt to recapture the Morea was foiled and the Ottoman reconquest of the peninsula was confirmed.
