= Šimun Kožičić Benja =

Roman Catholic bishop, writer and translator from Zadar

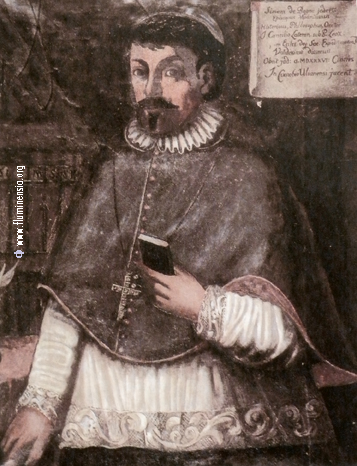
- Born: ca. 1460; Zadar
- Died: 1536; Zadar
- Occupation: priest
- Known for: founder of the Glagolitic printing house in Rijeka

Šimun Kožičić Benja (ca. 1460 – March, 1536) was a Croatian-Dalmatian orator, humanist and printer, who served as the bishop of Modruš from 1509. He is primarily known for his speech De Corvatiae Desolatione (On the desolation of Croatia) in 1513, as well as for the Glagolithic printing press he founded in 1530, Rijeka.

== Biography ==
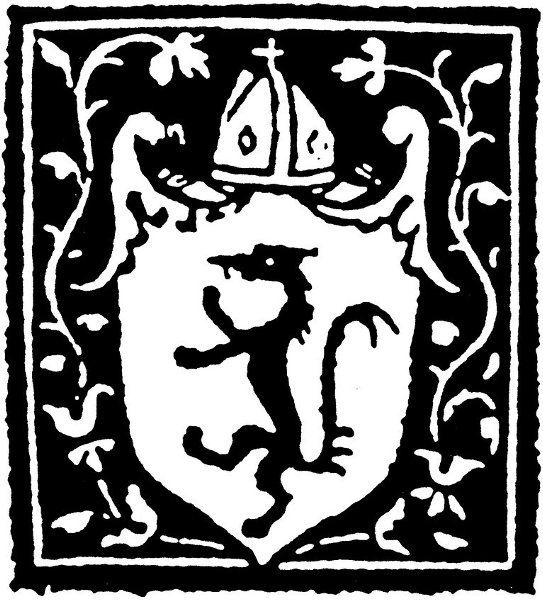
Coat of Arms of Šimun Kožičić Benja, printed on his books.

He was born into the prominent Benja-Kožičić family in Zadar, at the time part of the Republic of Venice. His mother, Orea, was Venetian from the Contarini household. While his parents wanted him to become a soldier he decided to enter the priesthood. After his education in Zadar and Rome, he became a canon and the prefect of the Church of St. John near the port in Zadar.

Pope Julius II named him bishop of Modruš in 1509, a position he held up until his death in 1536. Between 1513 and 1521, he also managed the bishopric of Senj. This was a time of uncertainty in Croatia after the Croatian loss to the Ottoman Empire in the Battle of Krbava Field of 1493. Following the fall of Modruš to the Ottoman Empire in 1528, he relocated to Vinodol, and then to Rijeka the following year. He was a supporter of Ferdinand I Habsburg during the dynastic succession.

In 1532 he returned to Zadar where he died in March 1536. He was laid to rest in the Franciscan monastery of St. Jerome in Ugljan, where his brother Ivan Donat put up a grave marker. A retrospective portrait of Bishop Šimun Kožičić Benja is located in the National Museum in Zadar.

== Political and publishing activity ==
=== De Corvatiae desolatione ===
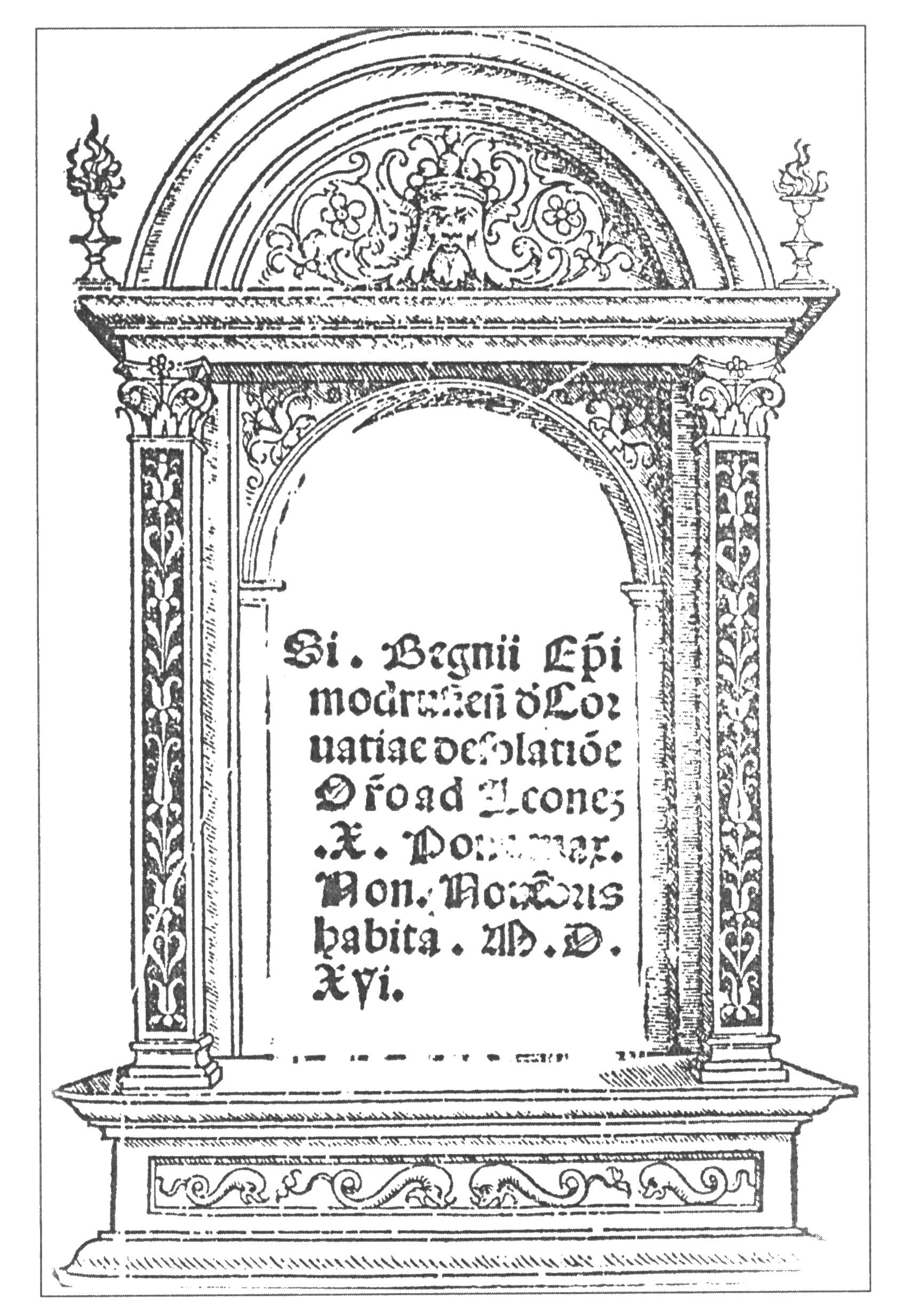
1530 publication of De Corvatiae desolatione

At the Fifth Lateran Council in Rome in 1513, Šimun Kožičić Benja delivered two Latin speeches in which he lectured on the hardships of his homeland. The first one on 27 April, dedicated to Bernardin Frankopan, he stressed the need for the renewal of the Catholic church and for a war against the Ottomans. His second, most famous speech of 1516 called De Croat[i]ae desolatione (On the desolation of Croatia) was given in front of Pope Leo X in which he sought immediate help to Croatia in wars against the Ottomans. Both of these speeches were eventually published in 1516 in Paris, and subsequently in 1530, during Benja's stay in Venice.

=== Printing press in Rijeka ===
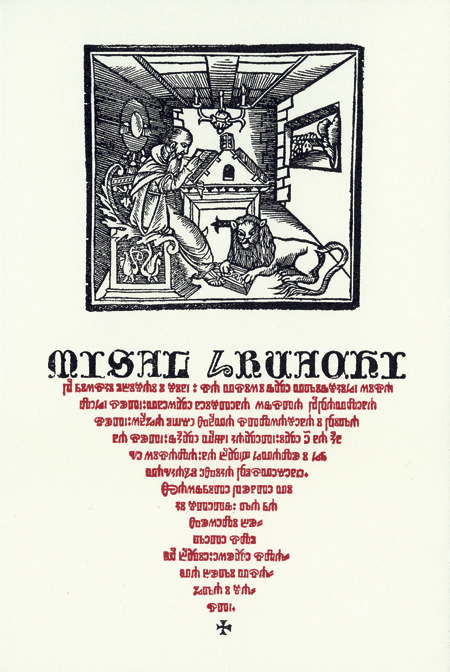
Misal hruacki, 'Croatian missal'

After the Turks attacked Modruš, Benja travelled to Rijeka in 1530 and founded his Glagolitic printing press. Kožičić wrote the well-known work Psaltir which was a small prayerbook which contained some basic Christian prayers, as well as some psalms and other songs for prayer and for use in mass. These kinds of booklets were the basics which aspiring priests and other believers used to learn to read. On the first page of Kožičić's Psaltir, at the very top, was written a primer which contained all the Croatian letters written in Glagolitic script. After this came the Our Father, Hail Mary and the start of the Apostles Creed.

By 1531 he printed five more books in Glagolitic: Oficij rimski (a prayer book), Knjižice krsta (a book of rites), Misal hruacki (a missal), Knjižice od žitija rimskih arhijerov i cesarov (a historic work about the Roman popes and emperors) and Od bitja redovničkog knjižice (a handbook about the proper conduct of clerics).

== See also ==
- List of Glagolitic books
