= Battle of Dubica =

1513 battle between Croatia and the Ottoman Empire

- Part of the Ottoman wars in Europe; Ottoman–Croatian Wars
Date	16 August 1513
Location	Dubica, Kingdom of Croatia 45°11′21″N 16°47′55″E
Result	Croatian victory

Belligerents
Ottoman Empire	Kingdom of Croatia

Commanders and leaders
Junuz-aga; Feriz Beg	Petar Berislavić; Nikola III Zrinski; Mihovil Frankopan; Franjo Berislavić; Ivan Karlović

Strength
7,000 light cavalry	Unknown

Casualties and losses
3,000 killed	Unknown

The Battle of Dubica (Croatian: Bitka kod Dubice) was fought on 16 August 1513 between the Kingdom of Croatia and the Ottoman Empire. The Croatian army was commanded by Petar Berislavić, Ban of Croatia, while the Ottoman army was mostly composed of forces from the Sanjak of Bosnia under the command of Sanjak-bey Junuz-aga. The two armies clashed near the town of Dubica in central Croatia, between the Sava and Una rivers. The battle resulted in a Croatian victory and heavy losses for the Ottoman side.

== Background ==
After a few unsuccessful Ottoman attacks at the beginning of the 16th century, apart from minor frictions and looting at the border, there were no major conflicts in Croatia and Hungary. On 20 August 1503 King Vladislaus II concluded a seven-year peace treaty with Sultan Bayezid II and determined the borders with the Ottoman Empire. The armistice was generally respected and was renewed in 1511 for five years. However, Bosnian Sanjak-beys and sipahis had not honored the new ceasefire and were often ravaging the countryside of the Croatian border towns and constantly raiding Dalmatia. At the end of August 1511, the county of Modruš was heavily damaged.

In April 1512 Sultan Bayezid II was forced to abdicate the throne, and his son Selim I became the new sultan. Selim was more belligerent than his father and ignored all peace treaties signed with King Vladislaus, so Akıncı raids into Croatia proper became more frequent. In early Autumn 1512 the Ottomans conquered Srebrenik, Soko, Tešanj, and Brčko, basically the entire Banate of Srebrenik. At the same time the Ottomans crossed the Sava River and plundered the Slavonian Posavina to Una's mouth into the Sava. The Croatian capital Knin was besieged on 27 January 1513. Unlike raids in the previous years, these actions constituted a war campaign of a wider scale to establish the means for further conquests of Croatia.

== New Croatian Ban ==
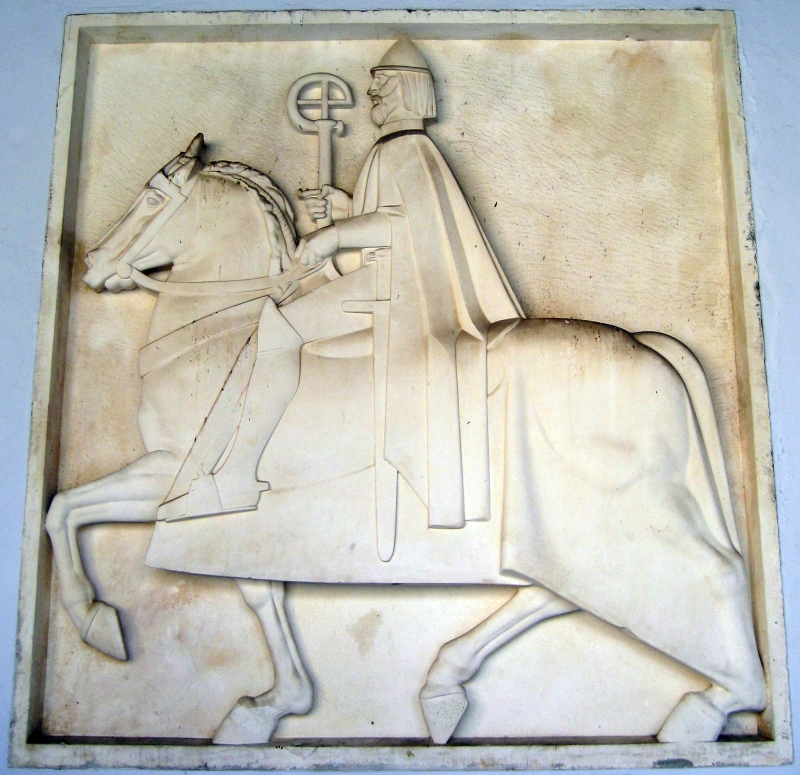
Monument to Petar Berislavić, the Ban of Croatia and commander of Croatian forces in the battle

Croatia and Ottoman expansion in the region in 1500

In the spring of 1513, Petar Berislavić, bishop of Veszprém, replaced Emerik Perényi as Ban of Croatia. Emerik Perényi had stepped down from his position due to illness. Berislavić fully pledged to stop the Ottoman invasion and defend the Croatian border on the line from Srijem, through Bosnia and Jajce, to Veliki Prolog in Dalmatia. Internal conditions in Croatia were also not favorable, aggravated by the increasing Ottoman danger. Centralist reforms of King Matthias Corvinus were abolished, and the nobility reestablished their old privileges, gaining tax and war subsidy exemptions. As a result, state revenues and military funding were drastically reduced. Some nobles even had an agreement with the Ottomans, paying them tribute and allowing their armies free passage through their territories. Military deployment at Ban's disposal was much smaller following the defeat at the Battle of Krbava Field in 1493. To raise the necessary funds, Berislavić implemented extraordinary burdens, taxed the Archdiocese in Zagreb and local parishes, and sold some of his estates.

The new Ban of Croatia went to Rome to seek help for Croatia, where he received financial aid from Pope Leo X. On 13 June 1513, during the Fifth Council of the Lateran, bishop of Modruš Simon Kožičić Benja also presented the difficult position of Croatia which was under constant Ottoman attacks.

== Battle ==
Ottoman forces, led by sanjak-bey Junuz-aga, entered the area between Una and Kupa rivers in early summer 1513 with 7,000 cavalrymen and attacked Blinja near Petrinja. When he heard about the incursion, Ban Petar Berislavić assembled an army with Count Nikola III Zrinski (father of Nikola IV Zrinski), Mihovil Frankopan of Slunj, and Franjo Berislavić, deputy ban of Jajce, aiming to prevent the Ottomans in further raids. The Croatian army went along the left bank of Sava up to Kraljeva Velika Fortress, then turned to Jasenovac where they crossed the Sava and went southwest, where Berislavić encamped near Dubica on 15 August. The Ottomans started building additional fortifications around their camp at Blinja when they learned of the Croatian army's presence in Dubica, but after hearing that the opposing army was much weaker in numbers, the Ottomans decided to attack first.

The following day on 16 August, a battle started, as Ottomans charged on Croatian army. As both armies clashed, the most distinguished Turks got killed in the fight, so Croatians took the initiative and started pursuing Turks who either fled or drowned in rivers Sava and Una. The battle ended in a heavy defeat for the Ottoman army. Estimates of Ottoman casualties range from over 2,000 to 7,000 killed, drowned while fleeing, and imprisoned, together with a large number of freed Christian captives. Among them there were four army commanders killed and one captured.

== Aftermath ==
News of the victory spread quickly. Berislavić was awarded a blessed sword from Pope Leo X on 25 December 1513, while King Vladislaus named him Count of Dubica and Prior of Vrana. The defeat did not stop Ottoman incursions. In the early part of 1514, they were again besieging Knin with 10,000 soldiers, but they failed to capture the city. Berislavić spent seven years in constant fighting with the Ottomans, faced with continuous money shortages and an insufficient number of troops until he was killed in an ambush during the battle of Plješevica on 20 May 1520.
