= Petar Berislavić =

Croatian bishop

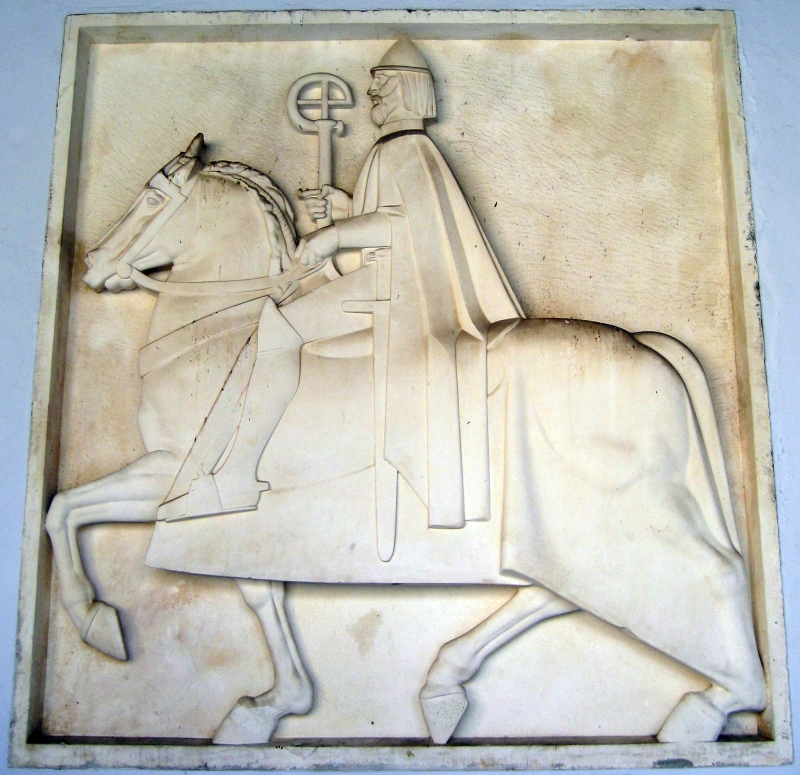
- Ivan Meštrović (1933) in Trogir

Ban of Croatia
- In office 1513 – 20 May 1520
- Preceded by: Emerik Perényi
- Succeeded by: Ivan Karlović

Personal details
- Born: 1475 Trogir
- Died: 20 May 1520 (aged 44–45) Vražja gora near Korenica, Kingdom of Croatia
- Resting place: Cathedral of St Michael, Veszprém, Hungary

Military service
- Battles/wars: Battle of Dubica (1513); Battle of Novigrad (1515); Battle of Jajce (1518); Battle of Plješivica (1520)

Croatia and Ottoman expansion in the region in the early 16th century.

Petar Berislavić (or Péter Beriszló in Hungarian) (Trogir, 1475 – 20 May 1520), was the Ban (viceroy) of Croatia from 1513 to 1520 and also bishop of Veszprém. With his activity elevated the status of the Ban of Croatia, and successfully confronted and formed an anti-Ottoman defensive system in the Kingdom of Croatia and Dalmatia.

== Family ==
Petar was born 1475 in Trogir as the son of Ivan (of Berislavići Trogirski) and Magdalena daughter of János Statileo.

He was friends with Marko Marulić, Toma Niger, and Antun Vrančić was writing his biography, which was finished and published as Vita Petri Berislavi by Ivan Tomko Mrnavić in 1620.

== Career ==
He studied theology in Trogir and Hungary, rising in 1512 to the title of bishop of Veszprém in the Roman Catholic Church. He is most known for being one of the leaders of the Croats during the Ottoman invasions into their territory. In 1503 or 1504 became the king's secretary, and in 1512, the treasurer, with diplomatic missions in Rome and Venetian Republic.

In 1513 became a Ban of Croatia, immediately starting to organize an anti-Ottoman defense system, financially also helped by Pope Leo X (which will later develop into the Croatian Military Frontier). In the August of the same year had a decisive victory against the Ottoman force at the battle of Dubica, for which received giftes by the Pope and Vladislaus II of Hungary named him prior of the Priory of Vrana and župan of Dubica. He continued to invest raised funds from taxes and annual tribe of the priory, Slavonia, Ragusa, own estates and Pope's help into the defense system. During the War of the League of Cambrai, actively advocated for the Croatian-Hungarian conquest of Venetian part of Dalmatia.

In 1515, although initially had success in Bosnia, eventually suffered a defeat at the Battle of Novigrad, which put into danger the defense of Jajce, losing forts of Bočac and Jezera, but routed the Ottoman siege of Jajce. In 1516, managed to collect exceptional taxes for the frontier forts, He had a successful Relief of Jajce (1518), and in 1519, defeating the Ottoman forces nearby, but didn't manage to make territorial gains by besieging Ottoman strongholds of Bočac and Jezera. Due to this and other Croatian contributions, the Pope Leo X in 1519 letter to Berislavić called the Kingdom of Croatia as the Antemurale Christianitatis (Croatian: Predziđe kršćanstva).

Berislavić died on 20 May 1520, during a winning battle of Plješevica between Bihać and Korenica, when he was ambushed and killed by the Ottoman forces (reportedly due to the lack of crucial intervention during the battle by captain of Klis, Petar Kružić).

== Gallery ==
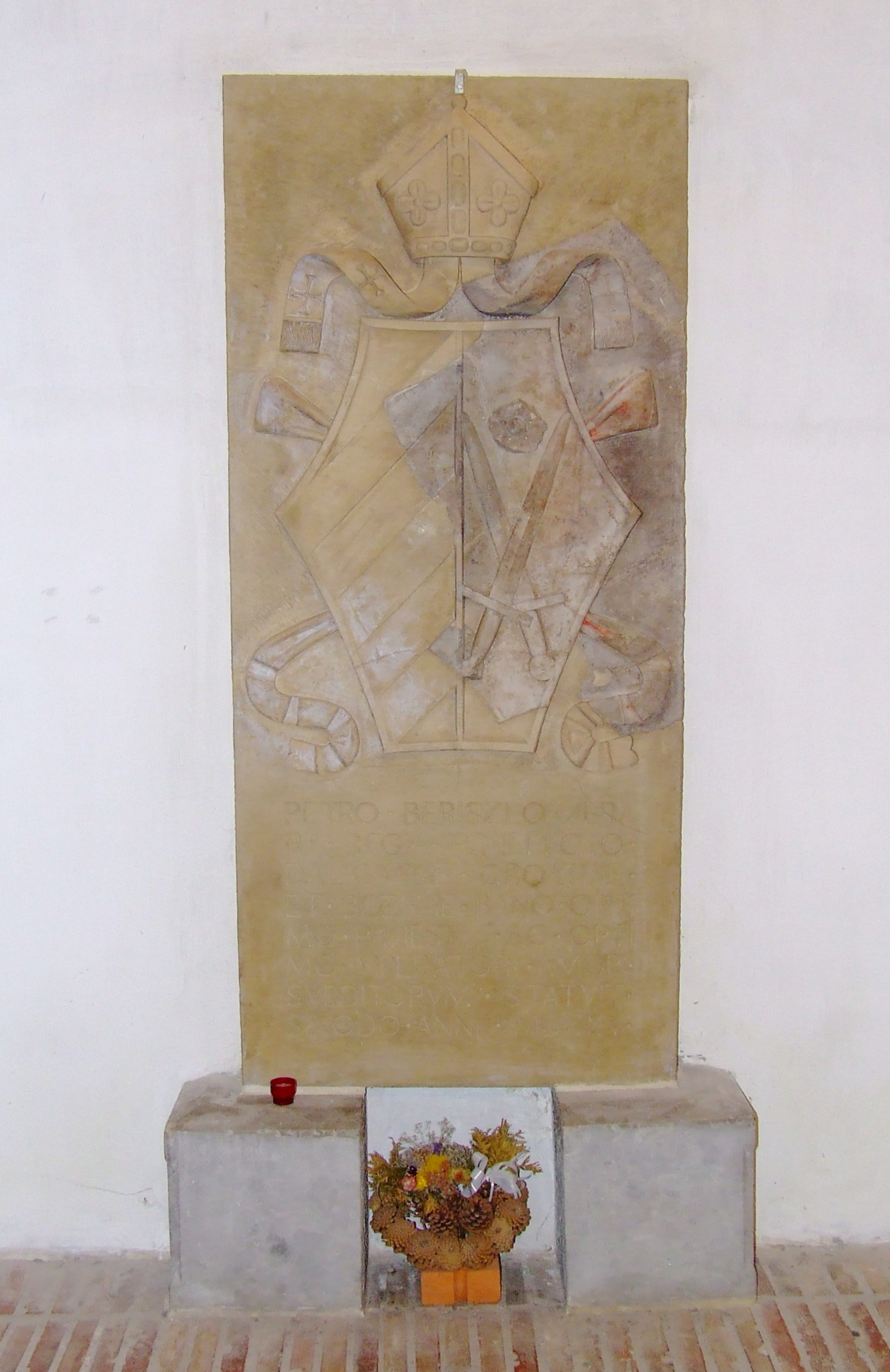
Berislavić's tombstone in the Cathedral of St Michael in Veszprém

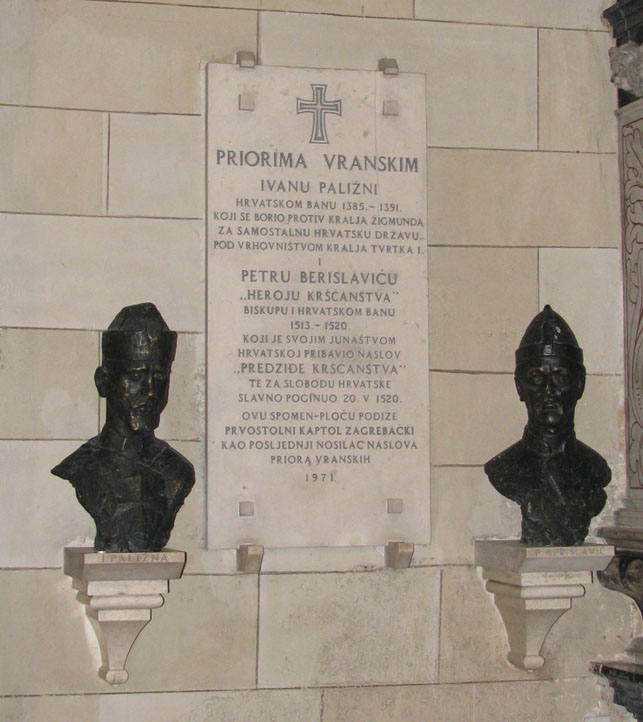
Bust (on the right) erected in 1971 in the Zagreb Cathedral

Preceded by Emerik Perényi	Ban of Croatia; 1513–1520	Succeeded by Ivan Karlović
