= Sisak Fortress =

Castle in Croatia

- Tvrđava Sisak; Stari grad Sisak
- Sisak, Croatia
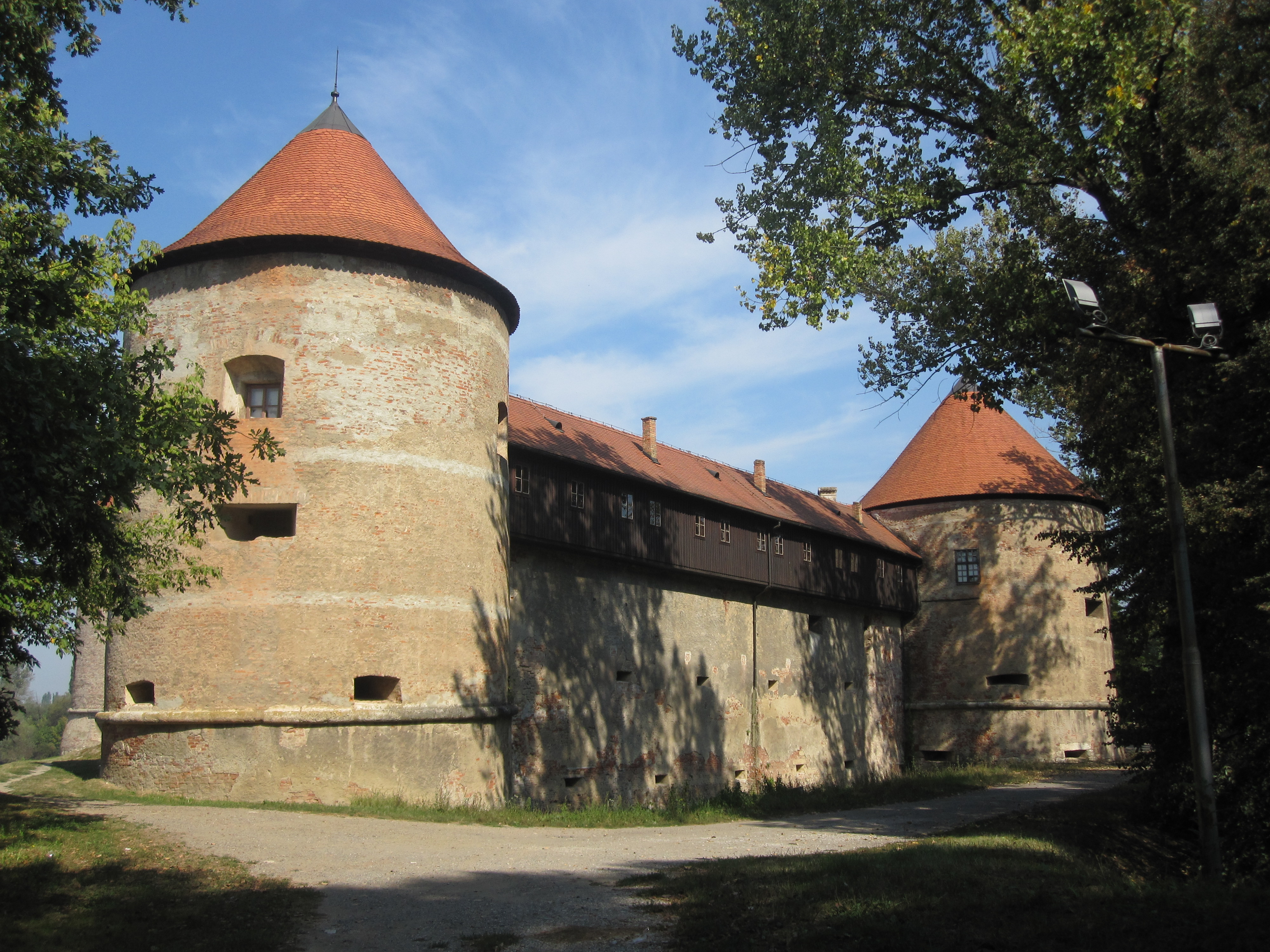
- Sisak Fortress from the south

Site information
- Type: Lowland fortress
- Controlled by: Bishop of Zagreb; from the 17th century: several other possessors
- Open to the public: Sisak Town Museum
- Condition: partially preserved

Location
- Coordinates: 45.470531°N 16.386222°E

Site history
- Built: 1544-1550
- Built by: Petar de Mediolanus
- Materials: brick, hewn stone (ashlar)

Cultural Good of Croatia
- Type: Protected cultural good
- Reference no.: Z-3487

The Sisak Fortress (Croatian: Tvrđava Sisak or Stari grad Sisak) is an early modern lowland fortification built on the bank of the Kupa River before its mouth into the Sava. It is situated in the suburb of modern-day city of Sisak, Sisak-Moslavina County, central Croatia.

It is a triangle-shaped structure, mostly made of brick and supported by stone parts. Each corner of the fortress is reinforced with a round tower covered by conical roof. Towers are connected by the more than 30 metres long thick walls with loopholes. Being on the river bank, the fortress has a natural line of defense from the west-southwest, while the other sides are partially protected by the Sava River in the immediate vicinity, flowing southeast.

In its history, the Sisak Fortress was damaged several times and subsequently subjected to renovations. Generally, although it needs a renewal today, it is in good condition. It houses the local town museum.

== History ==
The fortress was built following the increasingly threatening and devastating Ottoman attacks on the Kingdom of Croatia. The construction works were ordered by the Bishop of Zagreb, the owner of the estate, and lasted from 1544 until 1550. The master builder (director muratorum) was Petar /Pietro/ de Mediolanus from Milan and the overall construction costs were estimated at more than 3,300 florins (forints).

Having become Bosnian pasha in 1591, Hasan Predojević launched a few attacks on Sisak. During his last campaign in June 1593, his army of around 12,000 Ottoman soldiers suffered on 22 June 1593 a heavy defeat against the defending joint Croato-Slovene-Austro-Hungarian forces and he himself lost his life. This battle was a turning point, which meant interruption of further Ottoman conquest.

After slackening of Ottoman pressure on Croatian lands in the 17th century, the fortress changed its owners for a couple of times, being sometimes damaged, but immediately repaired. The last major damage occurred during the Second World War, as the fortification was hit by shells and the northwest tower was partially destroyed.

Present-day fortress houses some collections of the Sisak Town Museum (established in 1951), which include holdings of archaeology, ethnology, cultural history and numismatics.

== Gallery ==
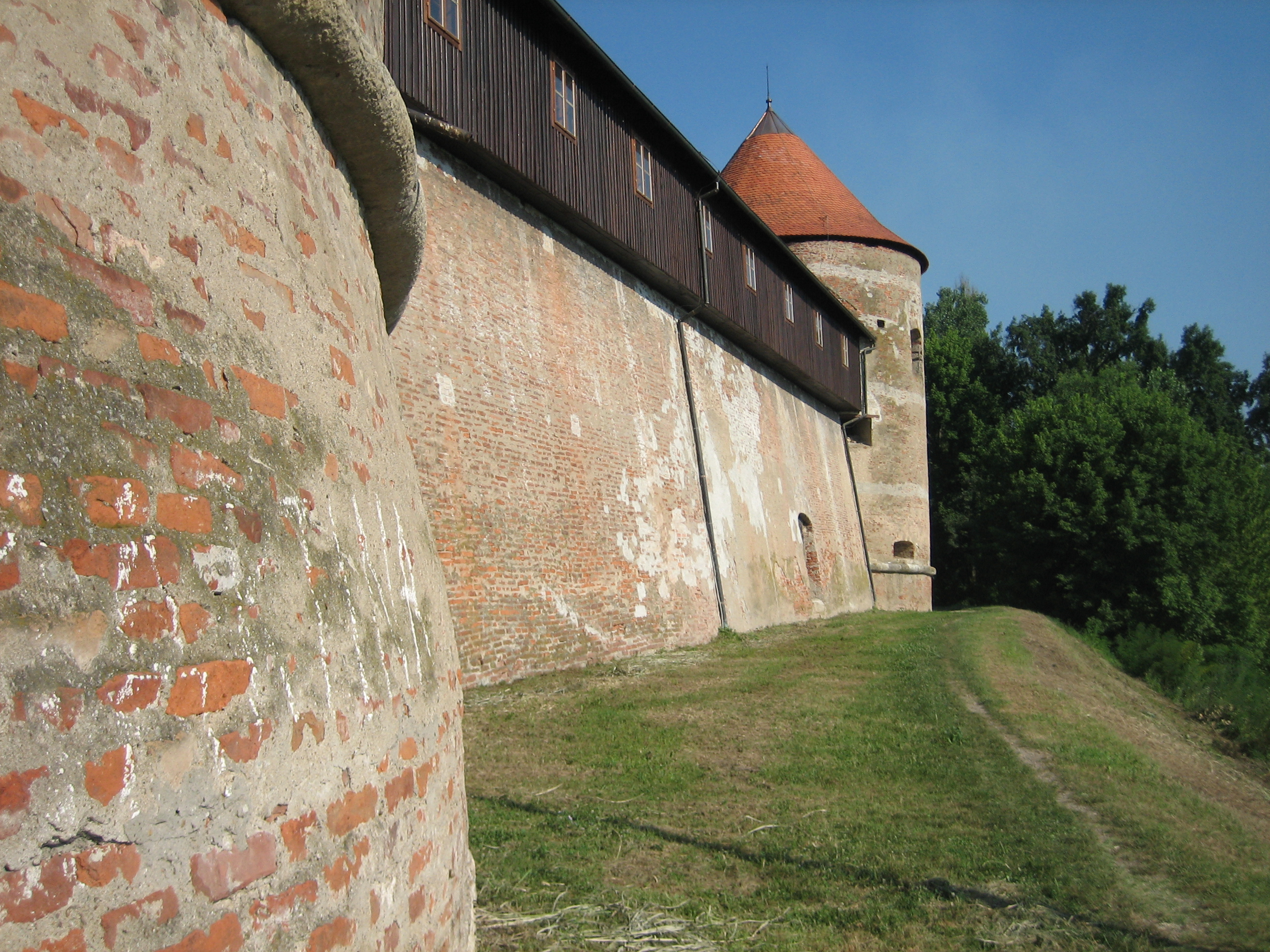
Walls of brick

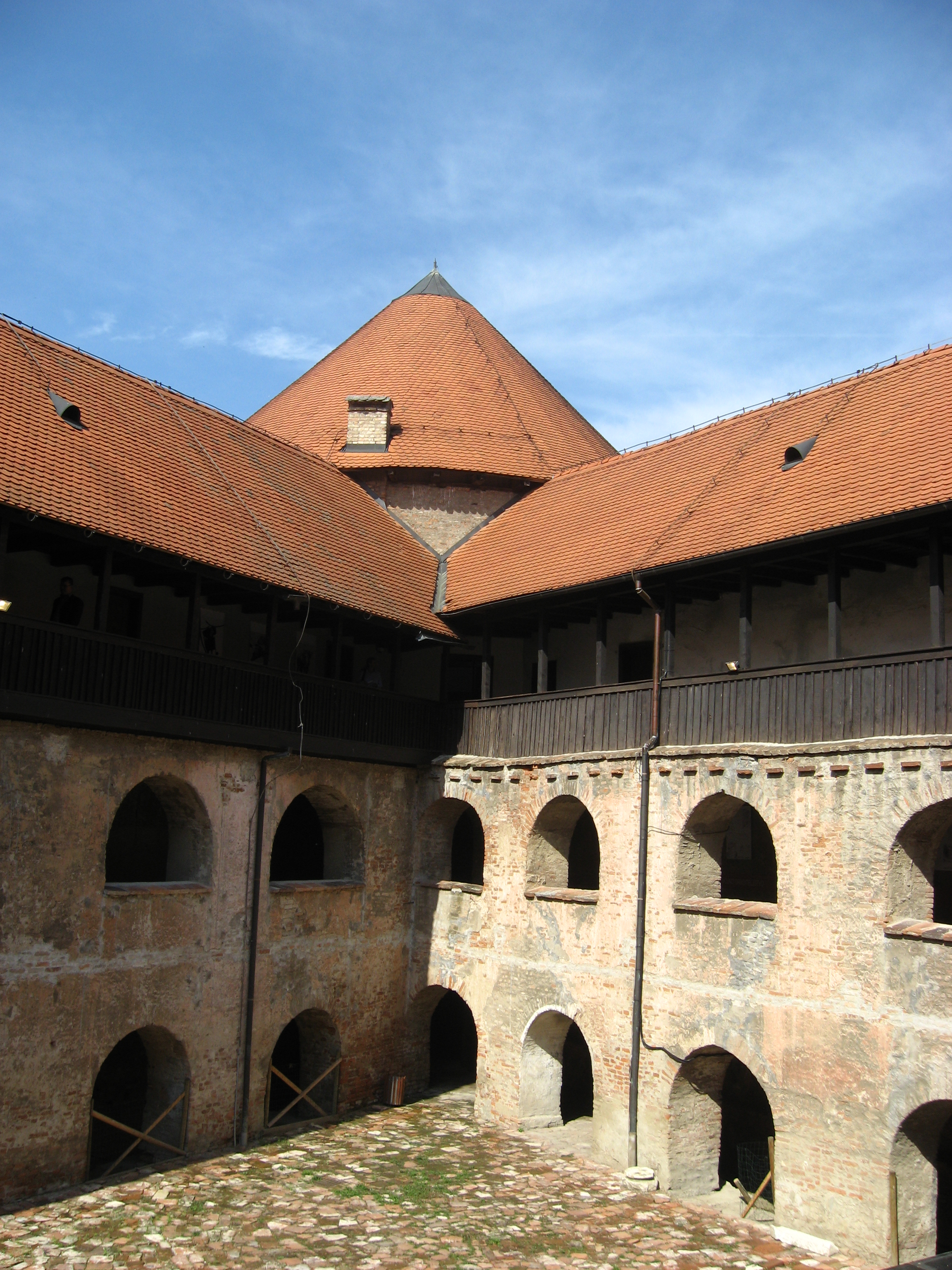
Inner court

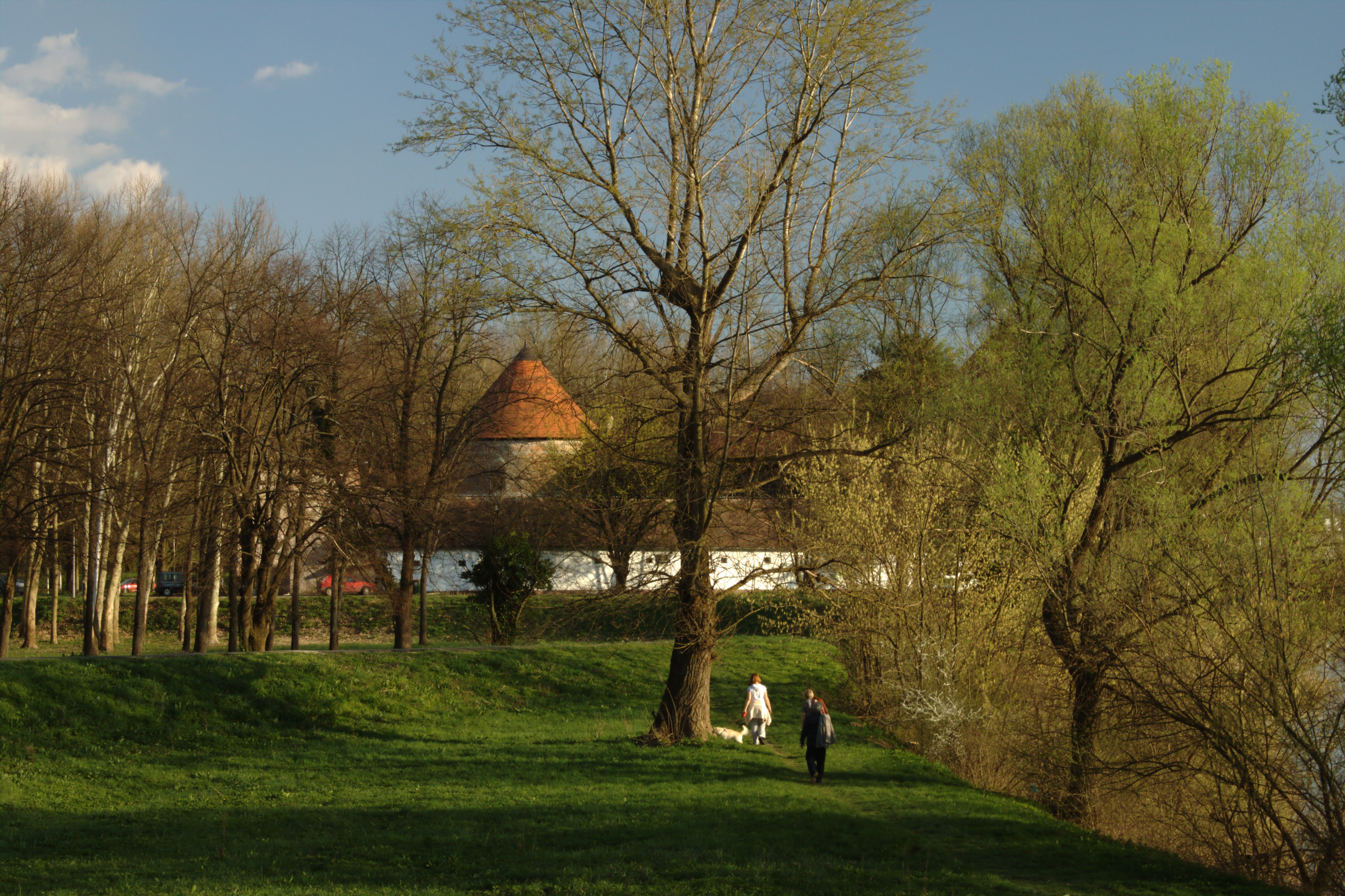
Fortress surrounded by trees

== See also ==
- List of castles in Croatia
- Timeline of Croatian history
- List of museums in Croatia
