= Bočac =

Bočac Бочац (Serbian)
- Village (Selo)
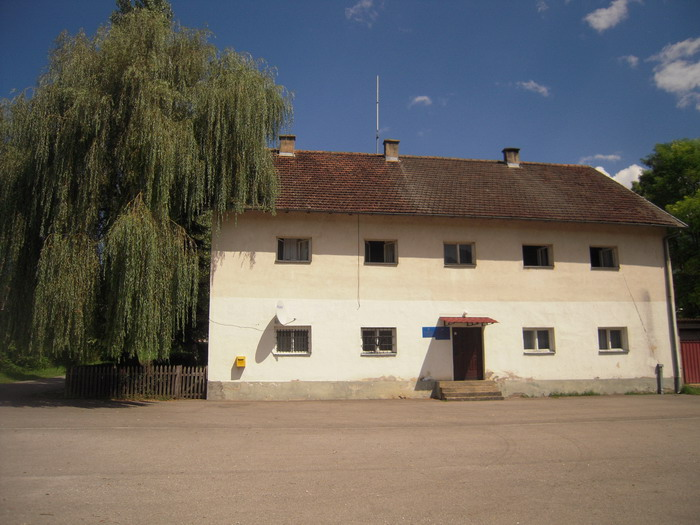
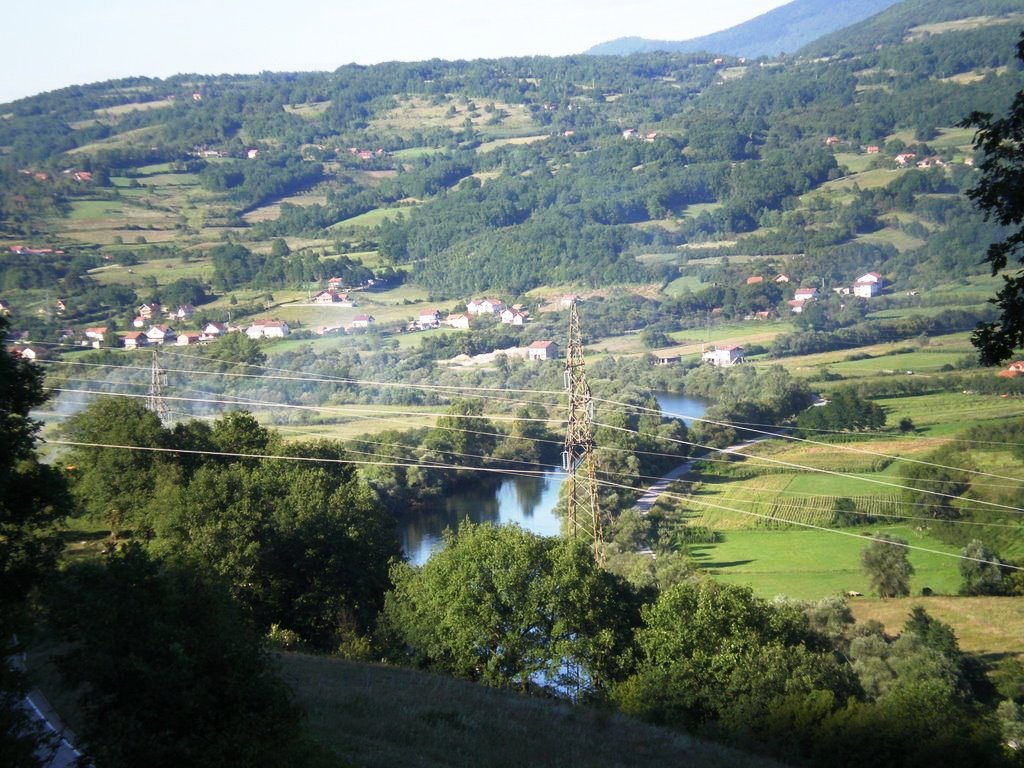
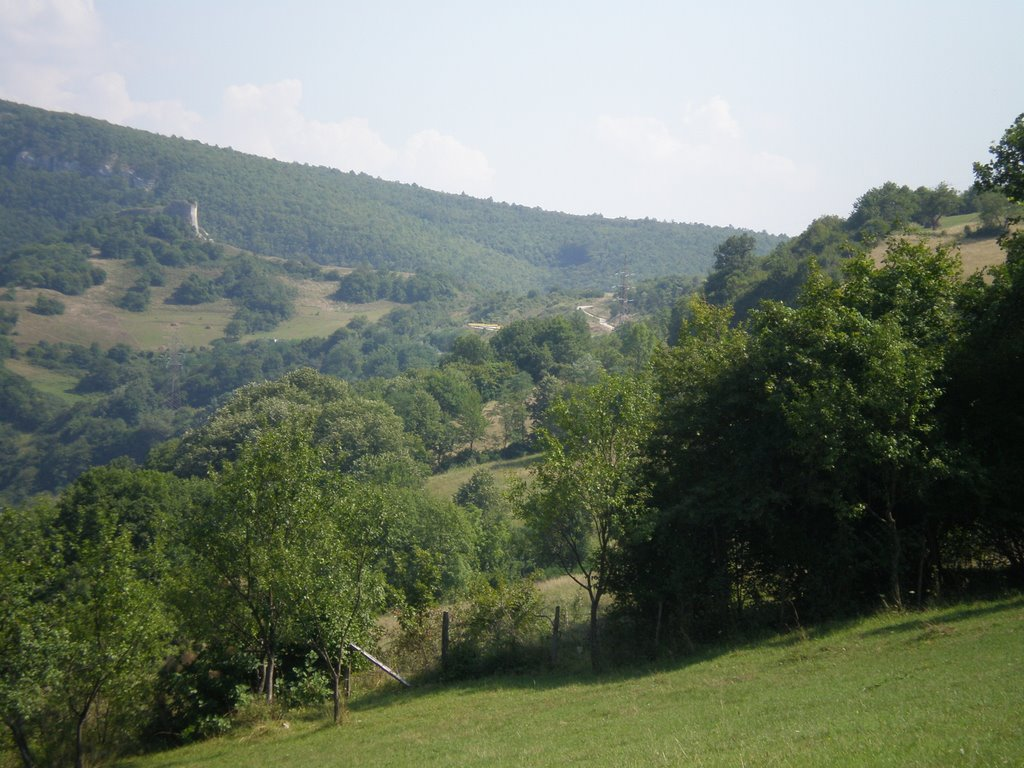
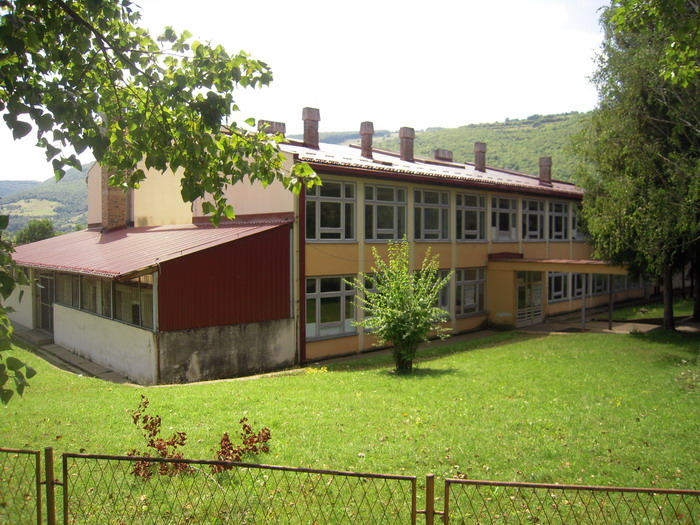

- Location within Bosnia and Herzegovina
- Coordinates: 44°32′N 17°09′E
- Country: Bosnia and Herzegovina
- Entity: Republika Srpska
- Municipality: Banja Luka

Population (2013)
  - Total: 864
- Time zone: UTC+1 (CET)
  - Summer (DST): UTC+2 (CEST)

Bočac (Serbian Cyrillic: Бочац) is a village in the municipality of Banja Luka, Republika Srpska, Bosnia and Herzegovina.

== Demographics ==
Ethnic groups in the village include:

- 857 Serbs (99.19%)
- 7 Others (0.81%)
