= John Jiskra of Brandýs =

Czech strategist and mercenary soldier (c. 1400 – c. 1469)

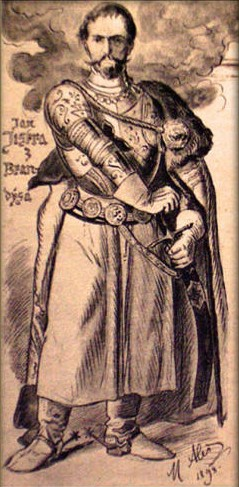
John Jiskra

John Jiskra's coat of arms

John Jiskra of Brandýs (in English sometimes referred as John Giskra; Czech: Jan Jiskra z Brandýsa, German: Johann Giskra von Brandeis, Hungarian: Jiskra János; c. 1400 – c. 1469), was a Czech strategist and mercenary soldier.

John Jiskra came from the Moravian branch of the noble family Lords of Brandýs, he was possibly a son of Alšík of Brandýs.

Jiskra spent his youth in Bohemia and partially also in Italy, where he – according to several sources – attended the battles of the Republic of Venice. In the Czech lands he became familiar with Hussite war strategies. Following the Battle of Lipany Jiskra, together with other Hussite soldiers, joined the army of Emperor Sigismund of Luxembourg and fought against Turkish troops in the region of Belgrade.

== In the service of Elizabeth of Luxembourg ==
In his young age he was soldiering in several European countries, including Italy. He ended up in Hungary in the service of Sigismund of Luxemburg, King of Hungary and he continued to serve Sigismund's successor Albert II of Germany.

King Albert's widow, Elizabeth of Luxembourg after the coronation of his son, Ladislaus the Posthumous at Székesfehérvár went to Győr in May 1440 and summoned Jiskra and his Czech mercenaries there as well. From there Jiskra accompanied the King, his mother and the Holy Crown of Hungary to Pozsony (Bratislava). After this Jiskra, who was bestowed upon by the queen dowager with the High Captaincy of the mining towns of Upper Hungary and Kassa (Košice) as well as Zólyom Castle (Pustý hrad) remained a supporter of the young Ladislaus V against King Władysław III of Poland and the estates of Hungary.

Using Hussite tactics he occupied Lőcse (Levoča), Bártfa (Bardejov), Körmöcbánya (Kremnica), Selmecbánya (Banská Štiavnica), Eperjes (Prešov), Késmárk (Kežmarok) in a short time. He minted coins in the name of King Ladislaus, and successfully interrupted Władysław's line of communication with Poland. His men built small castles all over Upper Hungary which were served as a protection of the countryside and checked the enemy's movements. He imposed taxes and tributes on the peasants and settled Czech and Moravian artisans at the newly built castles.

In the life of Elizabeth, Jiskra successfully defended Upper Hungary against the attacks of Władysław and his allies, John and Nicolaus Perényi.

== Lord of Upper Hungary ==
After the death of Elizabeth, who was willing to make peace with Władysław, Jiskra remained on the hereditary king's side and made a pact with the occupied cities to secure Ladislaus' rule. In order to make peace Jiskra was invited by Władysław to the Diet of April 1444 along with other supporters of Ladislaus. At the diet he defended Ladislaus' cause with such vehemency, that his violent behavior almost caused his death. Władysław gallantly saved his life when he helped escape the disguised Jiskra to Győr, from where he went to Vienna to the court of Frederick III, Holy Roman Emperor, to visit Ladislaus.

He was elected a High Captain of Upper Hungary in 1445 for his part in the making of a Polish-Hungarian truce after the death of Władysław. He kept this title after the office itself abolished in the next year.

Meanwhile, his Czech mercenaries, who called themselves "the Brotherhood," were not obeying Jiskra's orders and were marauding in Szepes County and Sáros County and forcing Catholic priests to perform Hussite rituals. The Diet of 1449 decided that these Czechs should be attacked. After some unsuccessful minor skirmishes, the Regent, John Hunyadi, himself marched into battle against Jiskra. The result of his campaign was a truce at Mezőkövesd in March 1450. Kassa, Lőcse, Eperjes, Bártfa, Körmöcbánya, Selmecbánya and Zólyom remained in Jiskra possession and several smaller Czech bands left the country.

Despite the truce Jiskra refused to recognize the authority of the Regent and continued to mint money and award privileges. He called other Hussite bands to the country and fortified a monastery at Losonc (Lučenec) and marauded the countryside from there. He defeated Hunyadi and conquered most of Upper Hungary with the notable exception of Eger. He was defeated again after Hunyadi renewed his campaign against him and forced to take an oath of allegiance to the crown.

He was convicted again when he did not attend the Diet of 1452. His properties were confiscated. Kassa, Lőcse and Bártfa was given to Ulrich II, Count of Celje. Shortly after Jiskra left Hungary.

== Against the Hunyadis and in the service of Matthias ==
Around 1455, Ulrich II in order to strengthen the position of his party invited Jiskra and his mercenaries back to Hungary. The Czech condottiere entered the service of Ladislaus and fought against the marauding Czech Hussite bandits in Upper Hungary with little success. In 1457 he assisted in the arresting and execution of Ladislaus Hunyadi and helped to fight the ensuing rebellion after the execution.

When the younger Hunyadi brother Matthias Corvinus proclaimed king after the death of Ladislaus the Posthumous, Jiskra first supported him thanks to the mediation of George of Poděbrady, but shortly after he disobeyed Matthias orders and his mercenaries started to marauding again. He encouraged Casimir IV Jagiellon to take the Hungarian throne and tried to make an alliance with the Teutonic Order.

Although Jiskra lost his properties and forced to make peace after he was defeated in 1458 by Sebastian Rozgonyi and Ladislaus Hédervári, his fighting morale was renewed by the war between Matthias and Frederick III in 1461. He supported Frederick's claim to the Hungarian throne and took the leadership of an army against Matthias' ally Albert VI, Archduke of Austria after Frederick won his support with generous gifts and promises in Graz.

As Frederick was lost his interest in continuing the war after the death of Albert and the victories of Emeric Zápolya and Stephen Zápolya Jiskra started to explain his actions to Matthias I and sworn loyalty to him in writing. The King accepted his oath and paid 25,000 golden forints for Jiskra's lost castles in Upper Hungary and gave him the Castle of Lippa and the Castle of Solymos in Arad County.

Jiskra married the niece of the palatine of Hungary, Michael Ország and continued to serve faithfully Matthias Corvinus in his campaigns. The date of his death is unknown, he was mentioned the last time in 1467, when he was the commander of the King's army in a campaign against Stephen III of Moldavia.

His family remained in Hungary and his descendants are last mentioned in the 17th century.
