= Nicholas of Újvár =

Hungarian cleric

Nicholas
- Archdeacon of Újvár
- Installed: 1396
- Term ended: 1401
- Predecessor: John
- Successor: John

Personal details
- Died: after 1401
- Denomination: Roman Catholic
- Parents: Hartmann
- Education: University of Prague; University of Padua

Nicholas (Hungarian: Miklós; died after 1401) was a Hungarian cleric at the turn of the 14th and 15th centuries, who served as archdeacon of Újvár from around 1396 to 1401.

== Studies ==
Nicholas was born into a family which originated from Vienna. His father was a certain Hartmann (or Harthman). The family later settled down in the Kingdom of Hungary. Based on the royal charter of King Sigismund from 1394, he was of foreign (German) ethnicity.

Nicholas initially attended the University of Prague, where he finished his studies of seven liberal arts. He began his studies in canon law there, but he then transferred to the University of Padua. Under the name "Nicolaus de Ungaria", he is first referred to as undergraduate of the latter institution on 22 February 1390, when he took an oral exam under professor Francesco Zabarella. During his oratio, he referred to Petrarch's Secretum quoting the beginning of its second book. He took his final oral exam, also under Zabarella, on 1 August 1395, obtaining his degree of doctor decretorum. His oratio contains a treatise on Psalm 106 together with Petrarch reminiscences. His both oratios were preserved by the Karlsruhe Codex.

== Ecclesiastical career ==
Simultaneously with his studies, he received ecclesiastical benefice in Hungary. Prior to 21 January 1391, he was appointed a canon in the collegiate chapter of Pressburg (present-day Bratislava, Slovakia). On that day, Pope Boniface IX appointed him a canon of Eger and Freising too. In the same time, he was also appointed archdeacon of Újvár in the Diocese of Eger, but due to his studies abroad he was only able to take office years later. The pope justified the appointments with Nicholas' exemplary life and ongoing canon law studies.

In March 1394, King Sigismund ordered provost Lawrence Zámbó and canons of the Pressburg not to dare, under pain of losing their emoluments, to receive among them those who, although they had received emoluments from the pope or his legate, did not have royal permission to actually occupy them. He justified the issuance of the general decree by saying that, since he was the ius patron of the Pressburg chapter, he could not stand idly by while the canonries there were mostly occupied by "bullists" of foreign origin, whose ignorance of the customs and laws of Hungary led to various errors and scandals. In accordance with his decree, Sigismund deprived Nicholas from his benefice in Pressburg on 19 May 1394. The royal charter narrates that the collegiate chapter of Pressburg excluded Nicholas, who was preparing to occupy a canonry with a bull obtained from the pope, and did not allow him to occupy it, for which Nicholas, in compliance with the provisions of the bull, placed them under interdict. In his letter, King Sigismund confirmed the chapter in its proceedings and at the same time ordered them not to take into account the ecclesiastical punishment imposed on them. Historian Elemér Mályusz considered that Sigismund intended to enforce his royal sovereignty of ius supremi patronatus and the canons of "Hungarian" origin were virtually forced to reoccupy the benefices with the help of king against the canons of foreign origin who were appointed to these positions by the popes through papal bulls. In contrast, Norbert Tóth questioned the ethnic motivation, believing that there was a personal conflict between Nicholas, as the pope's protege, and the chapter.

Returning Hungary, Nicholas is first referred to as archdeacon of Újvár on 13 March 1396, succeeding a certain John, who is last mentioned in this capacity in March 1394. Nicholas held the position until 16 December 1401, when Pope Boniface IX took the benefice from him, since Nicholas has been away from it for several years, and for other reasons, and gave it to a certain Stephen Oláh.

== Sources ==
- Bene, Sándor (2023). Egy reneszánsz magyar író: Andreas Pannonius [A Hungarian Renaissance Author: Andreas Pannonius] (in Hungarian). Károli Gáspár Református Egyetem – L'Harmattan Kiadó. ISBN 978-963-646-101-0.
- C. Tóth, Norbert (2015). "Az egri káptalan archontológiája (1387–1526) [The Archontology of the Eger Chapter (1387–1526)]". Turul (in Hungarian). 88 (2). Magyar Heraldikai és Genealógiai Társaság: 48–71. ISSN 1216-7258.
- C. Tóth, Norbert (2017). "Külföldiek a magyarországi káptalanokban (1375–1424) [Foreigners in the Hungarian Chapters (1375–1424)]". Világtörténet (in Hungarian). 39 (1): 75–92. ISSN 0083-6265.
- C. Tóth, Norbert (2020). A pozsonyi társaskáptalan archontológiája, 1204–1462 [Archontology of the Collegiate Chapter of Pressburg, 1204–1462] (in Hungarian). Subsidia ad historiam medii aevi Hungariae inquirendam 12., National Archives of Hungary. ISSN 1787-9213.
- Haraszti Szabó, Péter; Kelényi, Borbála (2019). Magyarországi diákok francia, angol, itáliai és német egyetemeken a középkorban, 1100–1526 [Students from Hungary at the Universities of France, England, Italy and Germany in the Middle Ages 1100–1526] (in Hungarian). ELTE Egyetemi Könyvtár és Levéltár; MTA ELTE Egyetemtörténeti Kutatócsoport. ISBN 978-963-489-098-0.
