= Pápa (genus) =

Former Hungarian clan

Genus (gens) Pápa
- Country: Kingdom of Hungary
- Founded: 11th century
- Founder: Popo
- Dissolution: 14th century
- Cadet branches: Mezőlak branch

Pápa (also Papa) was the name of a gens (Latin for "clan"; nemzetség in Hungarian) in the Kingdom of Hungary, in the Árpádian era.

== History ==
According to written records from the 13th century, the ancestor of the kindred was a certain Popo (Pápa), a Bavarian knight who participated in Stephen I of Hungary's war against Koppány. Historian András Kubinyi argued that after the victory, Popo became the first head of the royal manor, established in Veszprém County, which is today known as Pápa (thus the town was named after him).

The kindred remained in the minor local nobility, the only notable member was Benedict, son of Syka (or Sike), who served as vice-judge royal (Latin: viceiudex curie domini regis) in 1244, under Demetrius Csák. In 1272, Paul I received the estate of Eund which belonged to Sopron Castle until then. The kindred also owned lands in Mezőlak and Acsád.

Ladislaus I was the first member of the Mezőlak branch and was also father of Nicholas Zámbó. Nicholas' nephews, John and Lawrence also took the Zámbó surname. Lawrence Zámbó served as provost of Pressburg (today Bratislava, Slovakia) from 1384 to 1402.

== Members ==
- Syka (or Sike)
  - Benedict, vice-judge royal (1244)
  - Lampert I
    - Paul I (fl. 1272–1286), married Elizabeth N (fl. 1304)
      - Nicholas I (died b. 1317), married twice: N, then Elizabeth Osl
        - Stephen I (fl. 1317)
        - Bungo (fl. 1317)
      - Mark (fl. 1304)
      - Ladislaus I (fl. 1317), Mezőlak branch
        - Martin (fl. 1347–1366)
          - Zámbó family
        - Ladislaus II (fl. 1347)
        - Nicholas Zámbó (fl. 1347–1395, died 1395), Royal treasurer (1377–1382), Master of the treasury (1382–1384 and 1385–1388)
        - Stephen II (fl. 1347–1374)
      - Paul II (fl. 1347)
      - unidentified daughter, married Hector II Nórápi, castellan of Hölgykő (fl. 1304–1317)
    - Matthew I (fl. 1286)
    - Lampert II (fl. 1286)
      - Matthew II (fl. 1310–1347)
        - Lawrence (fl. 1347)
        - Nicholas II (fl. 1347)
        - John (fl. 1347)

== Sources ==
- (in Hungarian) János Karácsonyi: A magyar nemzetségek a XIV. század közepéig. Budapest: Magyar Tudományos Akadémia. 1900–1901.
- (in Hungarian) Kristó, Gyula (1996). "Néhány megjegyzés Pápa korai középkoráról" In: Hermann, István (ed.): Tanulmányok Pápa város történetéből 2., Local Government of Pápa. pp. 6–13.
- (in Hungarian) Zsoldos, Attila (2011). Magyarország világi archontológiája, 1000–1301 ("Secular Archontology of Hungary, 1000–1301"). História, MTA Történettudományi Intézete. Budapest. ISBN 978-963-9627-38-3
