= Urban Nagylucsei =

Urban Nagylucsei was Bishop of Győr from 1481 to 1486, and Bishop of Eger from 1486 to 1491. He also administered the Bishopric of Vienna from 1485 to 1490. He was royal treasurer and head of the court of the Palatine of Hungary in the late 1480s.

== Sources ==
- Engel, Pál (2001). The Realm of St Stephen: A History of Medieval Hungary, 895–1526. I.B. Tauris Publishers. ISBN 1-86064-061-3.
- Kubinyi, András (2008). Matthias Rex. Balassi Kiadó. ISBN 978-963-506-767-1.
