= Lawrence Zámbó =

- Died: May 1402
- Noble family: House of Zámbó
- Father: Martin Pápa

Lawrence Zámbó de Mezőlak (Hungarian: mezőlaki Zámbó Lőrinc; died May 1402) was a Hungarian medieval cleric and Canon law jurist, who served as Provost of the St. Martin's Cathedral in Pressburg (Hungarian: Pozsony; today Bratislava, Slovakia) between 1383 and 1402.

== Life ==
As the son of Martin, he was a member of the Zámbó family which belonged to the kindred Pápa. His uncle was the influential royal treasurer and judge Nicholas Zámbó. Lawrence and his elder brother John also took the Zámbó surname after their uncle. Lawrence was first mentioned by contemporary records in 1374. He attended the University of Prague in 1383, then the University of Vienna in 1384, when he already held the position of provost. In Prague, he studied at the Faculty of Law, where he copied numerous legal texts, adapting them to Hungarian conditions. These works now are preserved by the Rare Books and Early Manuscripts at the Harvard Law School.

During his term as Provost of Pressburg, he had several jurisdictional conflicts and disputes with the vicar of the nominal supervisional Archdiocese of Esztergom, the local Cathedral Chapter of Pressburg, and with the canons from the surrounding areas. He was the last provost in Pressburg who was appointed as a candidate of a Pope.

== Sources ==
- C. Tóth, Norbert (2013). A székes- és társaskáptalanok prépostjainak archontológiája, 1387–1437 [Archontology of the Cathedral and Collegiate Chapters, 1387–1437] (in Hungarian). Magyar Tudományos Akadémia Támogatott Kutatócsoport Iroda. ISBN 978-963-08-7392-5.
- C. Tóth, Norbert; Lakatos, Bálint; Mikó, Gábor (2014). A pozsonyi prépost és a káptalan viszálya (1421–1425). A szentszéki bíráskodás Magyarországon – a pozsonyi káptalan szervezete és működése a XV. század elején [The Dispute between the Provost of Pressburg and its Cathedral Chapter (1421–1425)] (in Hungarian). Magyar Tudományos Akadémia Támogatott Kutatócsoport Iroda. ISBN 978-963-08-7391-8.
- Haraszti Szabó, Péter (2017). "Books and their creators from the medieval Kingdom of Hungary at the University of Prague" (PDF). Studia Historica Nitriensia. 21: 17–31. doi:10.17846/SHN.2017.21.1.17-31.

Lawrence House of Zámbó Born: ? Died: May 1402
Catholic Church titles
Preceded by Petrus de Corsino	Provost of Pressburg; 1383–1402	Succeeded by John Uski
