= Royal treasurer (Kingdom of Hungary) =

Royal Treasurer of the Kingdom of Hungary
- Residence: Buda and Visegrád
- Appointer: King of Hungary
- Precursor: Economic functions of the Master of the treasury
- Formation: 1320s (1340)
- First holder: Paul Magyar (?)
- Final holder: George Martinuzzi
- Abolished: 1540 (1551)
- Succession: President of the Hungarian Chamber

The royal treasurer, or simply treasurer, also royal purse-bearer (Hungarian: kincstartó; Latin: thesaurarius), was an official in the Hungarian royal court, existed around from the 1320s to the 16th century. The position evolved from the royal dignity of Master of the treasury (Hungarian: tárnokmester; Latin: magister tavarnicorum regalium), which gradually adopted more and more judiciary functions over the centuries, thus the newly established royal treasurer put in charge of collecting and administering royal revenues in practice.

== History ==
=== Origins ===
The Master of the treasury (also translated as Lord High Treasurer, as its function was similar to its English equivalent) was initially responsible for collecting and administering royal revenues and prerogatives (regalia), especially when royal properties were considerably reduced under King Andrew II of Hungary (r. 1205–1235). For the upcoming decades, the Master of the treasury's sphere of authority had significantly enlarged by adopting important judiciary functions over financial matters and turned into the highest judges of the realm after the Palatine and the Judge royal. According to historian Győző Ember, the tasks were so hyperproliferative that the office-holder was no longer able to perform them alone. Thus a separate position was established during the reign of King Charles I of Hungary (r. 1308–1342), which dignity later became a permanent position with circumscribed legal powers.

The first office-holder of the royal treasury is generally regarded by the relevant historiography to have been Paul Magyar, whom king Charles I called his royal treasurer (Latin: thesaurarius noster) for the first time in 1340. Magyar initially acted as the deputy of Thomas Szécsényi, the then Voivode of Transylvania, who also took the Master of the treasury's financial tasks as procurator (thus acting official) following the death of the influential and innovative Demetrius Nekcsei (died in 1338). According to this widely accepted theory, Szécsényi was unable to perform the two functions at the same time because of the spatial distances, thus a local deputy (Magyar) was appointed to assist him. In contrast, historian Pál Engel considered a certain Demetrius, son of Peter as the first royal treasurer, who held the dignity from 1359 to 1370, during the reign of King Louis I of Hungary (r. 1342–1382), and also served as Bishop of Transylvania after 1368, later Archbishop of Esztergom (1376–1387). According to Engel, the office of treasurer was emerged into permanent status by 1377, possibly on the initiative of Demetrius himself.

However medievalist Boglárka Weisz argues that references for the dignity had already appeared in royal charters from the 1320s. A certain noble, Michael was mentioned as "treasurer of the royal court" (Latin: aule regie tesaurario) in 1323. Charles I already referred to Paul Magyar as "thesaurarius noster" in 1325 (in the previous year, he was only castellan of Gímes yet). Two years later John, Canon of Fehérvár (held that ecclesiastical position between 1313 and 1345) was mentioned as "tezaurarius regalis et custos ecclesie Albensis" by a royal charter. Paul Magyar already served as „major of the tárnoks" (Latin: maior tavarnicorum) from 1323 to 1326, which meant the supervision over the tárnoks (financial officials).

=== Functions and reforms ===
The royal treasury (Latin: domus tavernicalis) located in Buda. The treasurer became responsible for collecting tax from the royal towns and also received the accounts of the chamber counts. Initially, however, the Master of the treasury preserved several important financial functions – coinage, collecting chamber's profit (lucrum camerae) and mining duties. Already Demetrius oversaw the treasury's goods and gifts (munera), and also retained and stored the royal charters on estate donations. According to Weisz, the royal archives was established in Visegrád Castle.

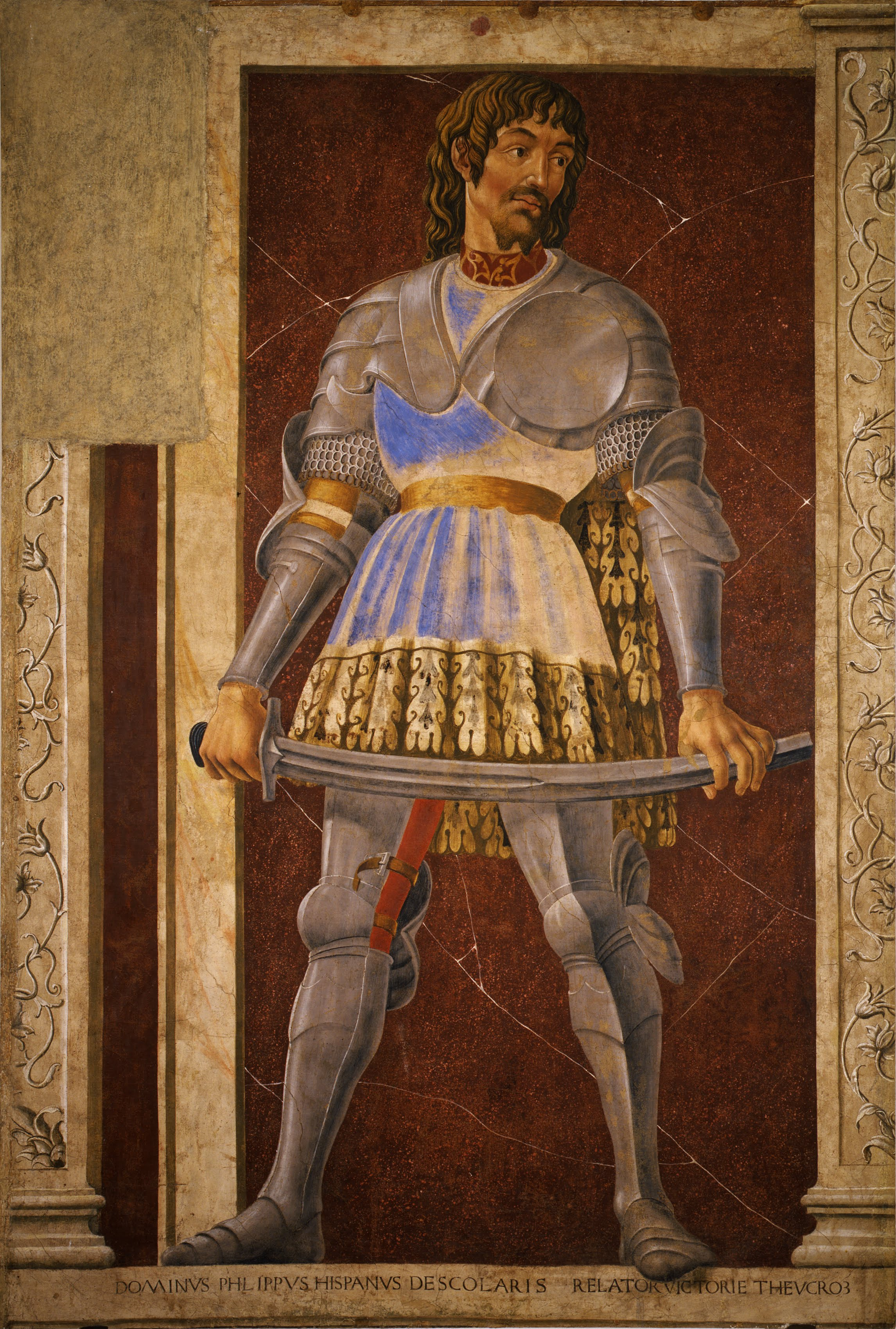
Pipo of Ozora, King Sigismund's notable financial advisor and royal treasurer

The first office-holder who seems to have been valued for his financial expertise, was Nicholas Zámbó, appointed to the position in 1377. As a loyal supporter of Dowager Queen Elizabeth of Bosnia, he administered the royal revenues with the title of archtreasurer, and later promoted to Master of the treasury in 1382. During the Peace of Turin in 1381, Zámbó personally received the annual tribute of 7,000 ducats which the Republic of Venice should pay to the crown of Hungary. By the end of the 14th century, the office of royal treasurer became almost entirely independent from the Master of the treasury, when the direction and control of finance were placed in the hand of the royal treasurer, separated off the administration of justice performed by the Master of the treasury. The two functions officially separated and sanctioned by the laws of 1405. Thus the Master of the treasury lost all of his economic role under the Angevin kings. The supervision of the tárnoks and royal estates transferred to the so-called „major of the tárnoks", while the administrative part in the government of the royal estates were assumed by the royal treasurer.

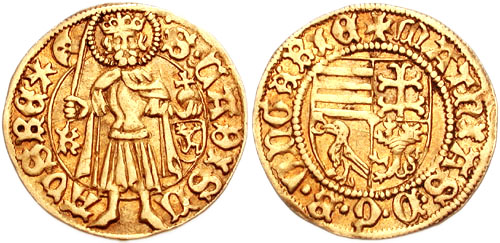
Matthias's golden florin depicting King Saint Ladislaus and Matthias's coat-of-arms

By the middle of the 15th century, the royal treasurer became the most influential member of the royal council. He was in charge to handle part of land-grants, administrated inland and customs revenues, as well as mining royalties, remitted the defrayments of the treasury, but also reported on military and executive matters of the royal castles and towns. The private landowners' income, however, belonged to the tasks of the castellan of Buda. As the direction of economic policies were not involved in the competences of the royal treasurer, the office had never become one of the great baronial dignities of the realm. Thus the royal treasurer was consequently omitted from the lists of baronial officers in the royal charters.

The office of royal treasurer was mostly a confidant position, which provided an opportunity to build informal influence. One of the most notable royal treasurers, John Ernuszt inspired Matthias Corvinus's reform of the royal revenues, especially the centralization of their administration and the abolishment of previous tax exemptions. So, in practice, the royal treasurer could set a direction for national economic policy. A staff of experts was formed around the royal treasurer in the 15th century: the treasury already had a vice-treasurer, secretary and notary by the end of the 15th century. Frequently the royal treasurer himself issued charters composed by his staff members, and only in some important matters of nationwide interest had the royal chancellery to issue the document.

However, sometimes this informal influence proved to be drawback for the royal treasurers, who usually became victims of the power struggles between the barons. For instance the Estates of the realm passed decrees about the collection and administration of the royal revenues in the absence of Matthias in 1474. The barons, who did not support the King's war for the Bohemian Crown, initiated hat taxes were to be spent on the defence against the Ottoman Empire. At the demand of the Diet, John Ernuszt promised that he would execute the new laws. After his return to Hungary, the king made Ernuszt a scapegoat for the decisions adopted at the Diet, but did not dismiss him. His son, Sigismund Ernuszt also served as royal treasurer since 1494. At the Diet in 1496, Sigismund was accused of having embezzled royal tax revenues. King Vladislaus II (r. 1490–1516) ordered to arrest him and was only released after he paid a large ransom and proved his innocence with a large-scale account. In 1509, Benedict Batthyány was also arrested as a result of his opponents's successful intrigues. The notable merchant Alexius Thurzó was imprisoned too following the death of his mentor Archbishop George Szatmári, and the Fugger–Thurzó property was even confiscated for a short time in 1525.

=== End of the office ===
During the Jagiellonian era, the lesser nobility have gained prominence through the Diet at the expense of the barons and the royal council. This also affected the position of royal treasurer. In 1507 the Diet determined by law that no dignity could be filled without the royal council's consent (which was filled with lesser nobles after 1498), and in 1511, the collection and supervision of the extraordinary tax was taken away from the royal treasurer and entrusted to a baron (Stephen Telegdi) and a lesser nobleman (Ladislaus Szentpéteri) as elected officers of the Estates (Hungarian: rendi kincstartó). This method was applied again in 1518 and after the fall of Belgrade in 1521.

After the disastrous Battle of Mohács on 29 August 1526, the Kingdom of Hungary divided into two parts, while the central authority collapsed. John Zápolya and Ferdinand of Habsburg were both elected kings of Hungary, on 10 November and 17 December, respectively. Ferdinand I reorganized the state administrative structure by the introduction of the Austrian practice; he established the Hungarian Chamber in 1528, a board functioning on a permanent basis. Although its first president, Nicholas Gerendi still bore the dignity of "thesaurarius" based on the continuity, but his successors finally abandoned the title. John I, whose realm meant the survival of Hungarian administrative tradition, retained the position. The last office-holder George Martinuzzi styled himself "royal treasurer" until his murder in 1551, but the dignity effectively ceased to exist with the death of John Zápolya in 1540.

== List of royal treasurers ==
=== Fourteenth century ===
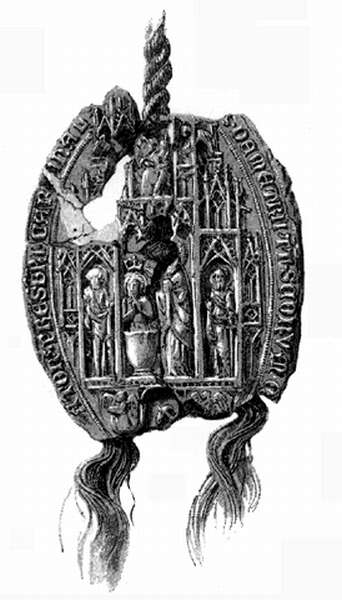
Seal of Cardinal Demetrius

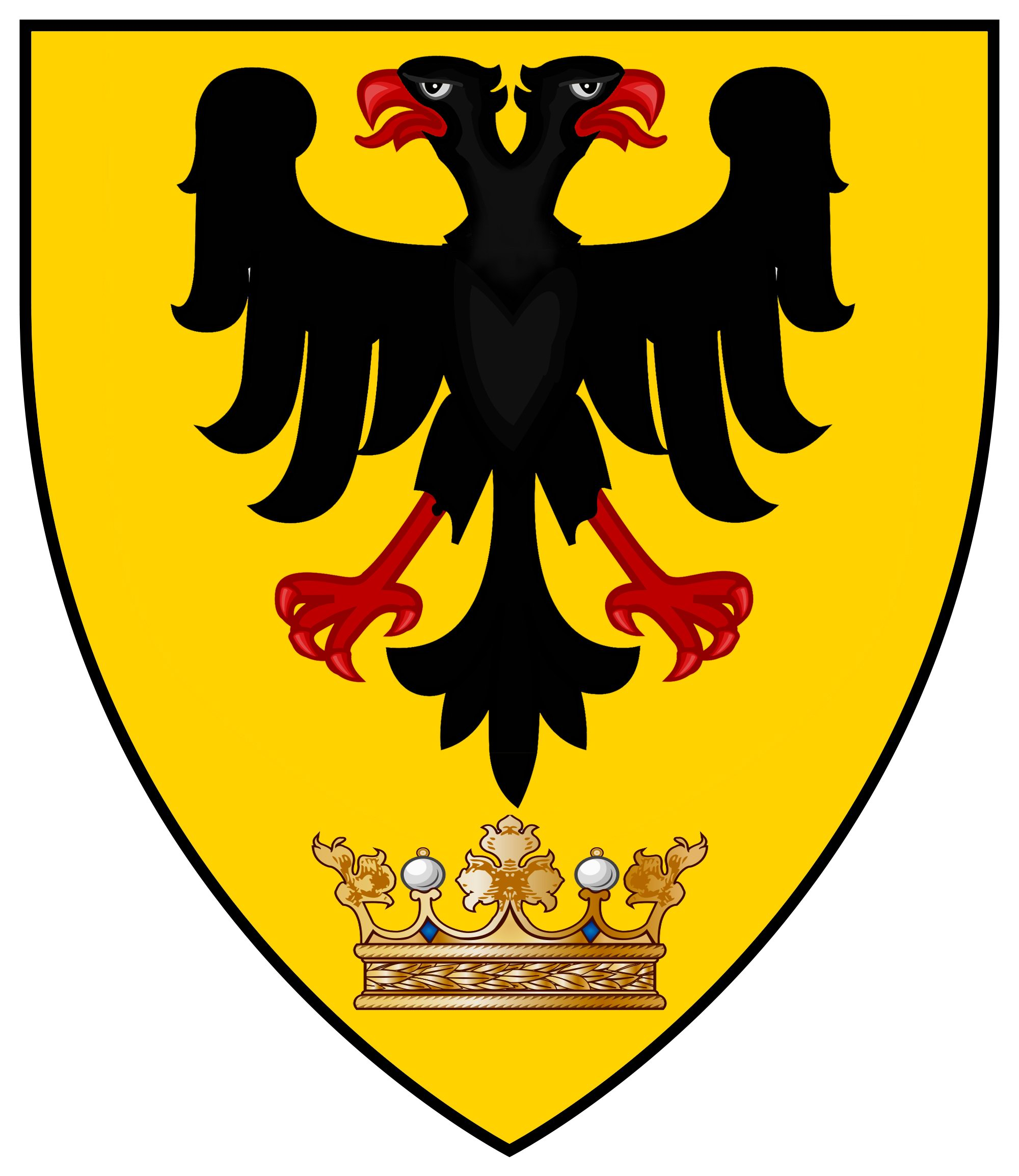
Coat-of-arms of the Szécsi family

Term	Incumbent	Monarch	Notes	Source
c. 1323	Michael	Charles I	"aule regie tesaurario"	
c. 1325	Paul Magyar	Charles I	first term; "thesaurarius noster"; also castellan of Gímes (1322–1345) and "maior tavarnicorum" (1323–1326)	
c. 1327	John	Charles I	"tezaurarius regalis et custos ecclesie Albensis"; also Canon of Fehérvár (1313–1345)	
c. 1340	Paul Magyar	Charles I	second term; "thesaurarius noster"; also castellan of Gímes (1322–1345)	
c. 1351 (?)	Demetrius Marjádi	Louis I	"custos thesauri regis Ungarie"; also Canon of Várad (c. 1350); it is possible that he was only queenly treasurer ("custos thesauri regine"), like in 1350	
1359–1370	Demetrius, son of Peter	Louis I	also Bishop of Syrmia (1364–1368), then Bishop of Transylvania (1368–1376)	
1373–1375	John de Surdis	Louis I	also Bishop of Vác (1363–1375)	
1377–1382	Nicholas Zámbó	Louis I	also ispán of Trencsén County and castellan of Trencsén Castle (1377–1380), and Judge of the Jews (1381–1383)	
1382–1389 or 1390	Andrew Jakcs	Mary & Sigismund	together with his brothers George (1383–1391) and Stephen Jakcs (1387–1389); also ispán of Bereg (1382–1388), and Virovitica County (1388)	
1383–1391	George Jakcs	Mary & Sigismund	together with his brothers Andrew (1382–1389 or 1390) and Stephen Jakcs (1387–1389); also ispán of Bereg County (1382–1388)	
1387–1389	Stephen Jakcs	Mary & Sigismund	together with his brothers Andrew (1382–1389 or 1390) and George Jakcs (1383–1391)	
1392–1393	Frank Szécsényi	Mary & Sigismund	also Judge of the Jassic people (1393)	
1394–1396	Frank Szécsi	Mary & Sigismund	also ispán of Csepel queenly estate (1396)	
1397	Nicholas Szécsi	Sigismund	brother of Frank Szécsi (1394–1396)	
1398–1402	Michael Kápolnai	Sigismund	also Bishop of Nyitra (1393–1399), then Bishop of Veszprém (1399–1402)	
1398–1402	Stephen Debrői	Sigismund	participated in the rebellion against the king	

=== Fifteenth century ===
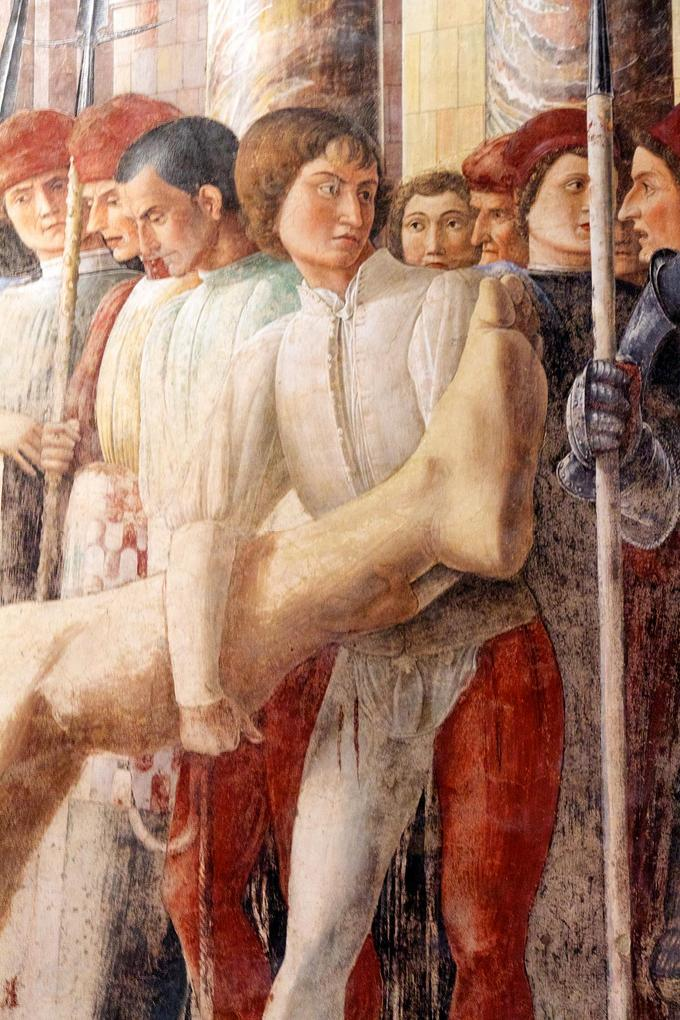
Janus Pannonius

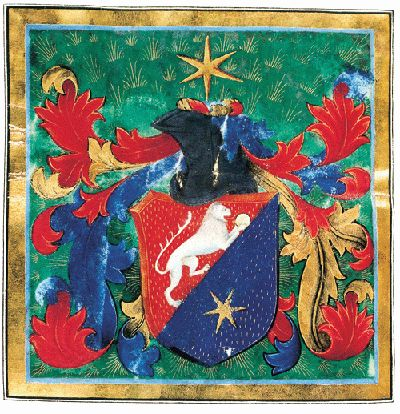
Coat-of-arms of Urban Nagylucsei

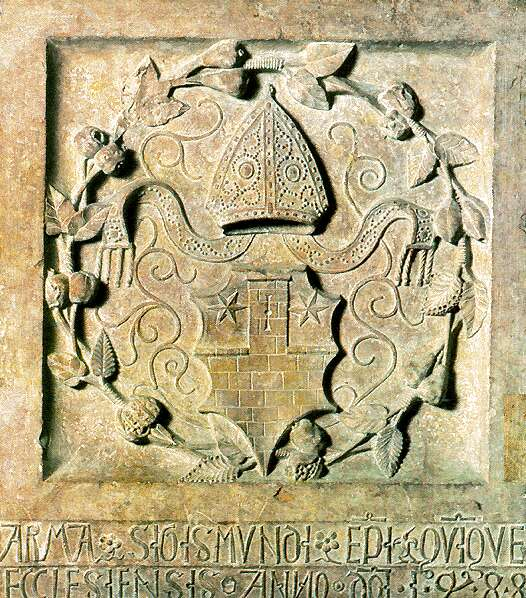
Coat-of-arms of Sigismund Ernuszt

Term	Incumbent	Monarch	Notes	Source
1402–1407	Vacant, tasks were divided between Nicholas Treutel and Mark of Nuremberg			
1407–1408	Pipo of Ozora	Sigismund	also ispán of Temes, Csanád, Arad, Krassó, Keve (1404–1426), Csongrád and Fejér Counties (1407–1426); also ispán of the chamber of salt (1400–1426)	
1408–1409	Charles, Count of Krbava	Sigismund	also castellan of Visegrád (1403–1409); founding member of the Order of the Dragon (1408)	
1410–1412	Zoelus de Nassis	Sigismund	also castellan of Buda (1402–1412) and ispán of Csepel queenly estate (1404–1411)	
1412–1436	John Rozgonyi	Sigismund	also ispán of Sáros (1409–1435), Zemplén (1428–1435) and Szepes Counties (1435–1437); also Master of the treasury (1433–1438)	
1436–1438	Michael Ország	Sigismund; Albert	first term	
1438	Ladislaus Szentgyörgyi	Albert		
1439	Leonard Noffri	Albert	according to an undated conceptus	
1439–1440	Ladislaus Töttös	Albert	first term	
1440–1453	Michael Ország		second term; supported Vladislaus I in the civil war; also ispán of Sopron (1441–1445) and Nyitra Counties (1448–1458); one of the Seven Captains of the Realm (1445–1446)	
1453–1456	Nicholas Várdai	Ladislaus V	also ispán of Szabolcs County (1453–1456)	
1456	Ladislaus Töttös	Ladislaus V	second term	
1457	Benedict Turóci	Ladislaus V	also ispán of Varaždin County (1452–1458)	
1458	John Túz	Matthias I		
1459–1464	Emeric Zápolya	Matthias I	also ispán of the chamber of salt (1459) and Captain of Upper Hungary (1460–1463)	
1464–1467	Bartholomew Besenyői	Matthias I	tax reforms and economic centralization began during his term; the first royal treasurer who was not referred as "baronus"	
1467–1469	John Csezmicei	Matthias I	together with John Ernuszt (1467–1476); held the title of "arch-treasurer"; also Bishop of Pécs (1459–1472)	
1467–1476	John Ernuszt	Matthias I	together with John Csezmicei (1467–1469); also ispán of Kőrös, Zólyom and Turóc Counties (1469–1476); also Ban of Slavonia (1473–1476); inspired Matthias's reform of the royal revenues and the abolishment of previous tax exemptions	
1476–1478	George Handó	Matthias I	also Provost of Pécs (1465–1478)	
1478–1490	Urban Nagylucsei	Matthias I	also Provost of Fehérvár (1474–1481), Bishop of Győr (1481–1486) and Bishop of Eger (1486–1491); he also administered the Bishopric of Vienna (1485–1490) and was head of the court of the Palatine of Hungary (1487–1491); resigned as royal treasurer during the coronation of Vladislaus II	
1490–1492	Oswald Túz	Vladislaus II	brother of John Túz (1458); also Bishop of Zagreb (1466–1499)	
1492	William Baumkircher	Vladislaus II		
1492–1494	Lucas Szegedi	Vladislaus II	also Bishop of Bosnia (1491–1493), then Bishop of Csanád (1493–1500)	
1494–1496	Sigismund Ernuszt	Vladislaus II	son of John Ernuszt (1467–1476); also Bishop of Pécs (1473–1505) and Ban of Croatia, Dalmatia and Slavonia (1494–1498); at the Diet in 1496, he was accused of having embezzled royal tax revenues, as a result dismissed and imprisoned	
1496–1500	Sigismund Vémeri	Vladislaus II	acting treasurer ("administrator regius") until 1498; also commendator of Provostry of Lelesz and Canon of Eger (1494–1498)	

=== Sixteenth century ===
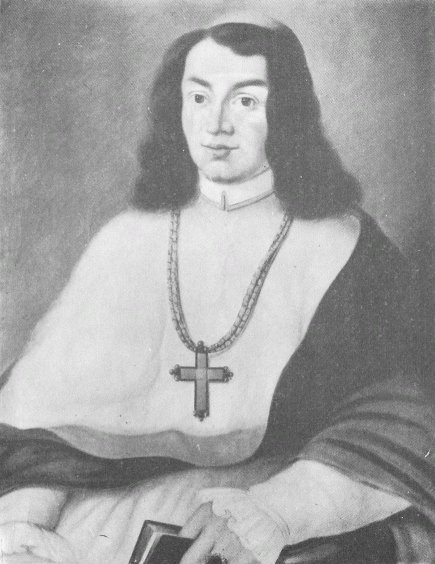
Paul Várdai

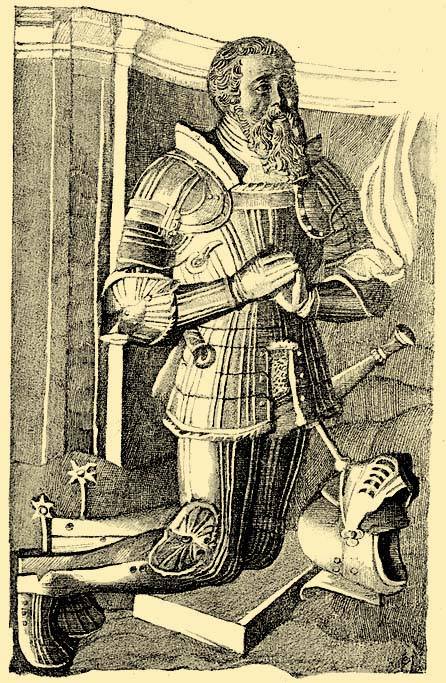
Alexius Thurzó

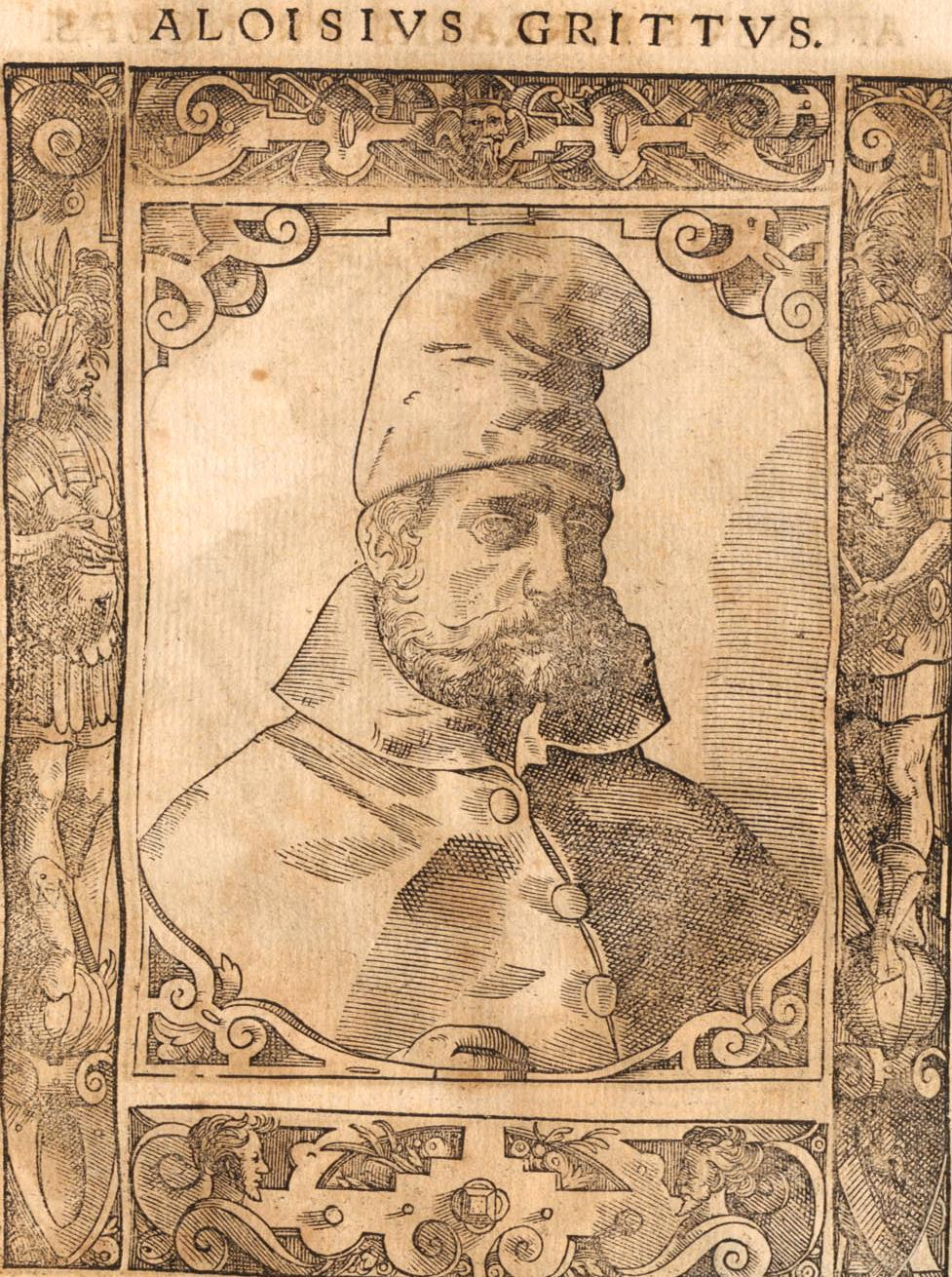
Lodovico Gritti

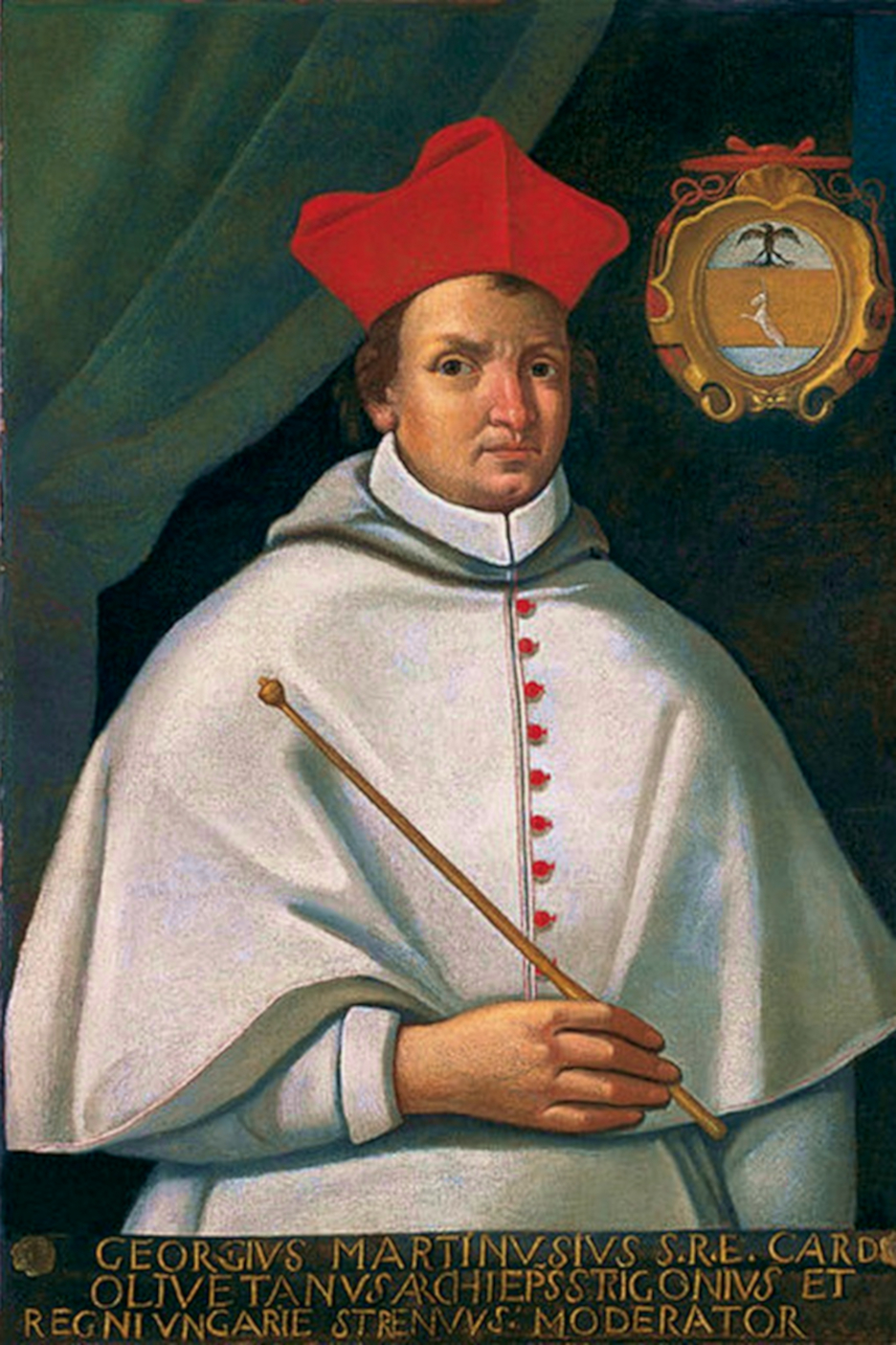
George Martinuzzi

Term	Incumbent	Monarch	Notes	Source
1500–1504	John Bornemisza	Vladislaus II		
1504–1506	Stephen Telegdi	Vladislaus II		
1506–1509	Benedict Batthyány	Vladislaus II	first term; also castellan of Buda (1506–1514); charged with fraud and embezzlement by his opponents, as a result he was dismissed and placed under investigation	
1509–1510	Francis Várdai	Vladislaus II	grandson of Nicholas Várdai (1453–1456); also Bishop of Vác (1509–1514)	
1510–1511	Benedict Batthyány	Vladislaus II	second term, restored after his innocence was proven; also castellan of Buda (1506–1514)	
1511–1513	Nicholas Herendi	Vladislaus II	acting treasurer ("administrator regius") until 1512	
1513–1516	Peter Berislavić	Vladislaus II	also Bishop of Veszprém (1512–1520); also Ban of Jajce (1513–1516), Ban of Croatia, Dalmatia and Slavonia, Prior of Vrana and Captain of Senj (1513–1520)	
1516–1517	Ladislaus Szalkai	Louis II	also Bishop of Vác (1513–1522)	
1517–1519	Paul Várdai	Louis II	first term	
1519–1520	Benedict Batthyány	Louis II	third term	
1520–1521	Paul Várdai	Louis II	second term; also Bishop of Veszprém (1520–1524)	
1521	Andrew Báthory	Louis II	also ispán of Szatmár County (1506–1528); also Commander of the Belgrade Fortress (1521)	
1522–1523	Alexius Thurzó	Louis II	first term; also Master of the Chamber (1521–1526)	
1523–1524	Paul Várdai	Louis II	third term; also Bishop of Veszprém (1520–1524), then Bishop of Eger (1524–1526)	
1524–1525	Alexius Thurzó	Louis II	second term; also Master of the Chamber (1521–1526) and Master of the treasury (1523–1527); imprisoned and the Fugger–Thurzó property was confiscated for a short time in 1525	
1525–1526	John Dóci	Louis II	first term; also Royal Chamberlain (1515–1526)	
1526	Alexius Thurzó	Louis II	third term; also Master of the Chamber (1521–1526) and Master of the treasury (1523–1527); last royal treasurer of the medieval kingdom	
1526	John Dóci	John I	second term; loyal to John Zápolya	
1528–1531	Nicholas Gerendi	Ferdinand I	loyal to Ferdinand I; served as the first President of the Hungarian Chamber, but still styled himself as "royal treasurer"; also Bishop of Transylvania (1528–1540)	
1526–1529	James Tornallyai	John I	relative of John Zápolya	
1529–1534	Lodovico Gritti	John I	also Viceroy of Hungary, appointed Bishop of Eger and ispán of Máramaros County (1529–1534); also Regent of Hungary (1530–1534), then Captain of Hungary (1532–1534), executed after the Siege of Medgyes (1534)	
1530–1531	Thomas Nádasdy	John I	acting for Lodovico Gritti (1529–1534)	
1532–1534	John Dóci	John I	third term; acting for Lodovico Gritti (1529–1534); executed after the Siege of Medgyes (1534)	
1534–1540 or 1551	George Martinuzzi	John I (John II)	also Bishop of Várad and perpetual count of Bihar County (1534–1551); styled himself "royal treasurer" until his murder (1551), but the position in fact became defunct following the death of John Zápolya (1540)	

== Elected treasurers ==
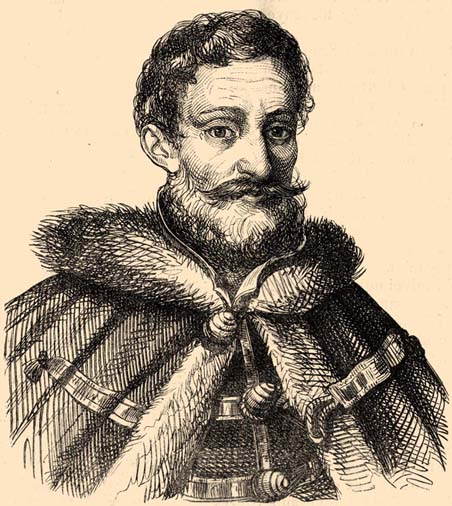
Stephen Werbőczy

Term	Incumbent	Diet	Notes	Source
1511	Stephen Telegdi	1511 (Rákos)	baron; previously also royal treasurer (1504–1506); elected by the Diet to collect extraordinary tax	
1511	Ladislaus Szentpéteri	1511 (Rákos)	lesser noble; elected by the Diet to collect extraordinary tax	
1518–1519	John Paksi	1518 (Bács)	baron; elected by the Diet to collect extraordinary tax and also became a member of the royal council	
1518–1519	Michael Szobi	1518 (Bács)	lesser noble; elected by the Diet to collect extraordinary tax	
1521–1522	Caspar Ráskai	1521 (Buda)	baron; elected by the Diet to collect extraordinary tax following the Siege of Belgrade; also ispán of Nógrád County (from 1514)	
1521–1522	Stephen Werbőczy	1521 (Buda)	baron; elected by the Diet to collect extraordinary tax following the Siege of Belgrade; also Chief Justice (1514–1525)	
1521–1522	Francis Essegvári	1521 (Buda)	lesser noble; elected by the Diet to collect extraordinary tax following the Siege of Belgrade	
1521–1522	Ladislaus Kanizsai	1521 (Buda)	lesser noble; elected by the Diet to collect extraordinary tax following the Siege of Belgrade	

== See also ==
- Kingdom of Hungary (1301–1526)
- Coinage in the Kingdom of Hungary
- Master of the treasury

== Sources ==
- C. Tóth, Norbert; Horváth, Richárd; Neumann, Tibor; Pálosfalvi, Tamás (2016). Magyarország világi archontológiája, 1458–1526, I. Főpapok és bárók [Secular Archontology of Hungary, 1458–1526, Volume I: Prelates and Barons] (in Hungarian). MTA Bölcsészettudományi Kutatóközpont Történettudományi Intézete. ISBN 978-963-4160-35-9.
- Engel, Pál (1996). Magyarország világi archontológiája, 1301–1457, I. [Secular Archontology of Hungary, 1301–1457, Volume I] (in Hungarian). História, MTA Történettudományi Intézete. ISBN 963-8312-44-0.
- Engel, Pál (2001). The Realm of St Stephen: A History of Medieval Hungary, 895–1526. I.B. Tauris Publishers. ISBN 1-86064-061-3.
- Fallenbüchl, Zoltán (1988). Magyarország főméltóságai [Great Officers of State in the Kingdom of Hungary] (in Hungarian). Maecenas Könyvkiadó. ISBN 963-02-5536-7.
- Kubinyi, András (1957). "A kincstári személyzet a XV. század második felében [Treasury Personnel at the Second Half of the 15th century]". Tanulmányok Budapest Múltjából 12. Akadémiai Kiadó. pp. 25–49.
- Markó, László (2006). A magyar állam főméltóságai Szent Istvántól napjainkig: Életrajzi Lexikon [Great Officers of State in Hungary from King Saint Stephen to Our Days: A Biographical Encyclopedia] (in Hungarian). Helikon Kiadó. ISBN 963-547-085-1.
- Soós, Ferenc (1999). Magyarország kincstartói, 1340–1540 [The royal purse-bearers of Hungary, 1340–1540] (in Hungarian). Argumentum. ISBN 963-446-118-2.
- Weisz, Boglárka (2015). "Ki volt az első kincstartó? A kincstartói hivatal története a 14. században [Who Was the First Treasurer? The History of the Treasurer's Office in the 14th-Century]". Történelmi Szemle (in Hungarian). 57 (4). Hungarian Academy of Sciences: 527–540. ISSN 0040-9634.
