= Benedict Pápa =

13th century Hungarian noble

Vice-Judge royal
- Reign: 1244
- Predecessor: Nicholas, son of Karul
- Successor: Dominic
- Died: after 1244
- Noble family: gens Pápa
- Father: Syka (Sike)

Benedict from the kindred Pápa (Hungarian: Pápa nembeli Benedek; died after 1244) was a Hungarian noble, who served as Vice-Judge royal (Latin: viceiudex curie domini regis) in 1244, under Demetrius Csák.

He belonged to the kindred Pápa as the son of Syka (or Sike). He had a brother Lampert.

== Sources ==
- Zsoldos, Attila (2011). Magyarország világi archontológiája, 1000–1301 [Secular Archontology of Hungary, 1000–1301] (in Hungarian). História, MTA Történettudományi Intézete. ISBN 978-963-9627-38-3.

Benedict Genus Pápa Born: ? Died: after 1244
Political offices
Preceded by Nicholas, son of Karul	Vice-Judge royal 1244	Succeeded by Dominic
