= Pavao Špirančić =

Croatian nobleman

Ban of Croatia
- In office 1459–1463
- Preceded by: Nikola Frankopan (younger)
- Succeeded by: Emeric Zápolya

Personal details
- Born: c. 1400 Croatia
- Died: 1463
- Spouse: Margareta

Pavao Špirančić or Sperančić (c. 1400 – 1463) was a Croatian nobleman and the Ban of Croatia and Dalmatia from 1459 to 1463. In the sources he is often mentioned with the nickname Horvat. He was appointed as Ban of Croatia and Dalmatia by Hungarian king Matthias Corvinus. With Pavao's and Frankopan family's help, the king Matthias tried to consolidate his power in the areas southern of Mount Velebit, where the Republic of Venice and Ottoman Empire posed threats.

== Biography ==
Pavao Špirančić was born in the first half of the 15th century in Croatia which was in that time under the rule of Hungarian king. In the 1459, he was appointed as Ban of Croatia and Dalmatia by Hungarian king Matthias Corvinus. Špirančić tried to gain support of Republic of Venice and make them an ally against Ottoman Empire which posed great threat for his territories and Hungarian kingdom. His attempts were unsuccessful, mainly because of his conquest of city of Klis and surrounding towns and areas, which made him a threat for Venetians and some other Croatian nobles who had their possessions there. He was also perceived as a threat by Bosnian king, who went to the Venetians and proclaimed him as an enemy. He was appointed again as Ban of Croatia and Dalmatia in 1463, together with Stjepan III Frankopan. In the same year, neighboring Kingdom of Bosnia was conquered by Ottoman Empire. Last Bosnian king Stephen Tomašević was killed and his wife Marija fled to the Croatian littoral where she was captured by Pavao who was enemy of her husband. As Pavao didn't get the help from Hungarian king, he was forced to ask Venetians for help. Later in the same year, his forces were defeated by Ottoman army and he was captured by the Ottomans where he died in captivity. Marija used that opportunity and fled to the Venetians. Pavao's wife Margareta was mentioned in the sources in the years after as "Banica" or "Princess of Cetina and Klis", but in 1466, Klis was taken by Croatian ban Ivan Thuz of Lak.

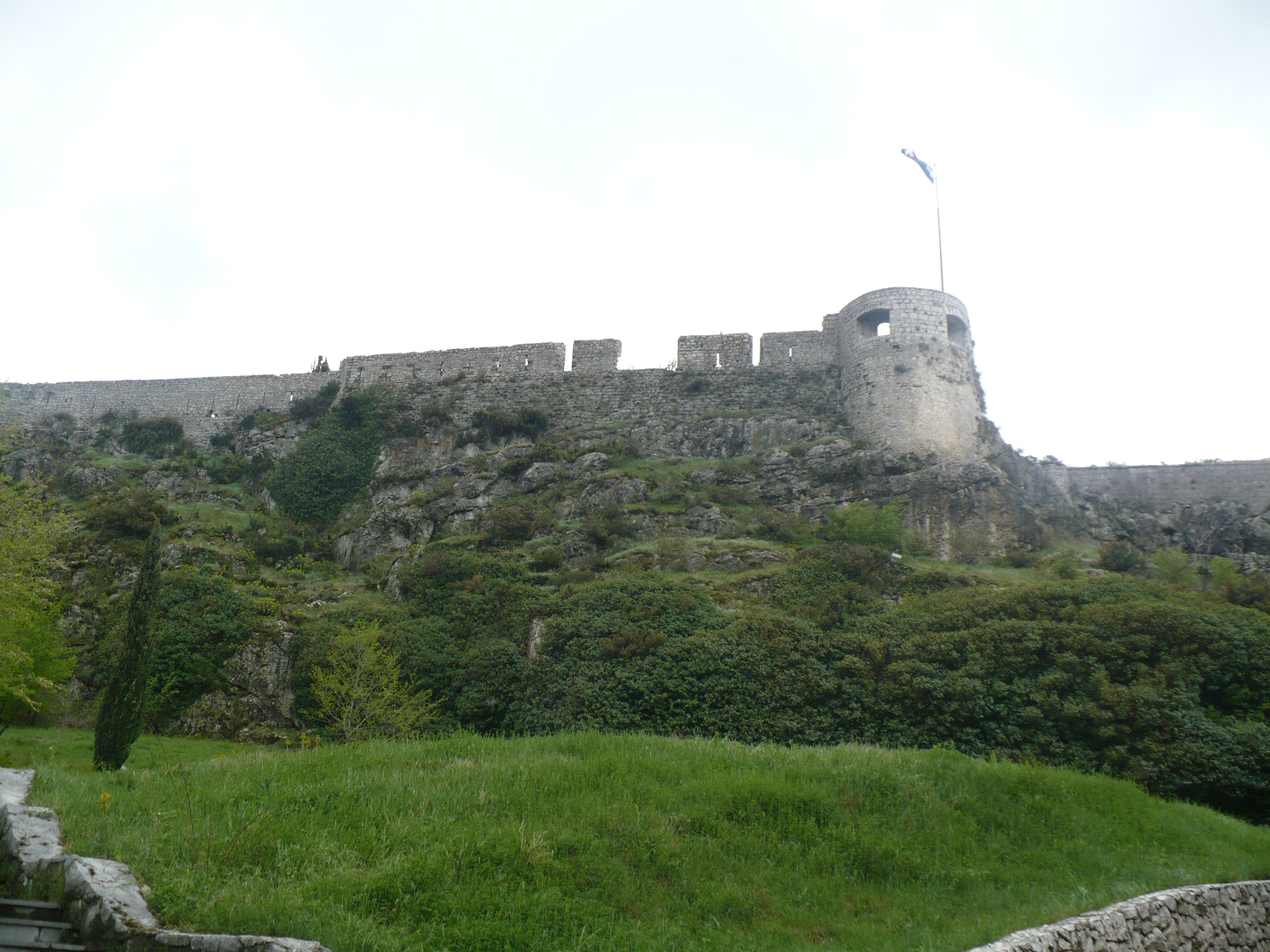
Klis Fortress

== See also ==
- History of Croatia
- List of rulers of Croatia
- Ban of Croatia

== Literature ==
- Klaić, Vjekoslav (1882). Poviest Bosne do propasti kraljevstva. Zagreb, Croatia: Dionička tiskara. pp. 320, 322, 339.
- Bosanska srednjevjekovna država i suvremenost. Sarajevo: Faculty of Political Sciences in Sarajevo. 1996.
