= Nicholas Zámbó =

14th-century Hungarian treasurer and judge

Master of the treasury
- Reign: 1382–1384; 1385–1388
- Predecessor: Thomas Szentgyörgyi (1st term); John Treutel (2nd term)
- Successor: John Treutel (1st term); Nicholas Kanizsai (2nd term)
- Died: 1395
- Noble family: gens Pápa; House of Zámbó
- Spouse: Elizabeth Szuharekai
- Issue: none
- Father: Ladislaus Pápa

Nicholas Zámbó de Mezőlak (Hungarian: mezőlaki Zámbó Miklós; died 1395) was a 14th-century Hungarian treasurer and judge, who held several court offices as a loyal supporter of queens Elizabeth and Mary.

== Career ==
Zámbó came from a minor Transdanubian noble family which belonged to the kindred Pápa. His father was Ladislaus de Mezőlak (died after 1317), he had three brothers: Martin, Ladislaus and Stephen. His nephew was Lawrence Zámbó, the Provost of Pressburg. Nicholas Zámbó began his career as a squire of Elizabeth of Bosnia, the queen dowager of Hungary, becoming a chamber count of Kassa and Szomolnok (1367–1371), castellan of Óbuda (1367–1377) and also castellan of Beszterce in 1373. He was one of the men used by the dowager queen and Palatine Nicholas I Garai to form a new, reforming government. Beginning in 1377, Zámbó was in charge of the kingdom's finances, holding the office of royal treasurer (Latin: thesaurarius). Zámbó was the first office-holder who seems to have been valued for his financial expertise. As a loyal supporter of Queen Elizabeth, he administered the royal revenues with the title of archtreasurer. During the Peace of Turin in 1381, Zámbó personally received the annual tribute of 7,000 ducats which the Republic of Venice should pay to the crown of Hungary. He was promoted to Master of the treasury (Latin: magister tavarnicorum) in 1382, the same year Elizabeth's daughter Mary succeeded to the Hungarian throne.

Zámbó also held the office of Jew judge (Latin: judex Judeorum), and as such, his primary task was to deal with litigations between Christians and Jews. He took advantage of the turmoil that followed Queen Mary's accession and attempted to gain fortune for himself at the expense of Jews he was supposed to protect. He had several of them arrested and maltreated, confiscating their property. Upon her return from Croatia-Dalmatia, Elizabeth exempted the Jews of Buda, Pressburg, Sopron, Nagyszombat, Székesfehérvár, and other cities from Zámbó's overlordship until he agreed to pay them out for the injuries inflicted upon them.

In August 1384, Zámbó, along with Nicholas Szécsi and the House of Lackfi, renounced allegiance to Queen Elizabeth, who ruled in her daughter's name as regent, due to her intention to break Mary's engagement to Sigismund of Luxembourg and have her married to Louis of France. Following the coronation of Sigismund as co-ruler, Zámbó gradually lost his political influence. In 1388, he was replaced by Nicholas Kanizsai.

== Later life ==
During his early reign, Sigismund tried to increase his regular annual revenues through pledging royal domains. Zámbó participated in this process in the case of Segesd, Somogy County. He already possessed lands around the town (Egyházasgamás and today Nagyatád). He has acquired the town on 22 June 1389 for 10,771 gold forints. In practise, Zámbó became the new lord of Segesd which lost town privileges. After several conflicts and unrest, Sigismund confirmed his decision in 1393. However Zámbó was accused of having embezzled chamber's profit (lucrum camerae) by John Kanizsai, Archbishop of Esztergom, demanding 1,200 gold forints. In response, Sigismund confiscated Zámbó's estates in Csallóköz (today in Slovakia). After his death in 1395, his widow Elizabeth Szuharekai returned Segesd to Sigismund to repay the alleged debt. Thus the ownership of Segesd was not a profitable business for the Zámbó family.

Between around 1367 and 1383, Zámbó founded a Pauline monastery in Kisbaté (Gecseny), Tolna County, dedicated to Saint Ladislaus I of Hungary and Sigismund of Burgundy. However the monks had left the monastery already in 1384 to join Told Abbey, established by Zámbó too in that year, in honor of the Virgin Mary. Zámbó was buried there after his death in 1395. The monastery functioned until 1552.

== Bibliography ==
- Engel, Pál (1996). Magyarország világi archontológiája, 1301–1457, I. [Secular Archontology of Hungary, 1301–1457, Volume I] (in Hungarian). História, MTA Történettudományi Intézete. ISBN 963-8312-44-0.
- Engel, Pál; Ayton, Andrew; Pálosfalvi, Tamás (1999). The realm of St. Stephen: a history of medieval Hungary, 895–1526 Volume 19 of International Library of Historical Studies. Penn State Press. ISBN 0-271-01758-9.
- Incze, János (2012). "Luxemburgi Zsigmond városzálogosításai: Segesd és Bártfa esete". In Péterfi, Bence; et al. (eds.). Micae Mediaevales II [The Town Pledgings of King Sigismund: the Case Studies of Segesd and Bártfa] (in Hungarian). Eötvös Loránd University. pp. 109–122. ISBN 963-9206-24-5.
- Markó, László (2006). A magyar állam főméltóságai Szent Istvántól napjainkig: Életrajzi Lexikon [Great Officers of State in Hungary from King Saint Stephen to Our Days: A Biographical Encyclopedia] (in Hungarian). Helikon Kiadó. ISBN 963-547-085-1.
- Patai, Raphael (1996). The Jews of Hungary: history, culture, psychology. Wayne State University Press. ISBN 0-8143-2561-0.
- Weisz, Boglárka (2015). "Ki volt az első kincstartó? A kincstartói hivatal története a 14. században" [Who Was the First Treasurer? The History of the Treasurer’s Office in the 14th-Century]. Történelmi Szemle (in Hungarian). 57 (4). Hungarian Academy of Sciences: 527–540.

Nicholas House of Zámbó Born: ? Died: 1395
Political offices
Preceded by John de Surdis	Royal treasurer 1377–1382	Succeeded by Andrew Jakcs
Preceded by Thomas Szentgyörgyi	Judge of the Jews; 1381–1383	Succeeded by Nicholas Garai
Preceded by Thomas Szentgyörgyi	Master of the treasury 1382–1384	Succeeded by John Treutel
Preceded by John Treutel	Master of the treasury 1385–1388	Succeeded by Nicholas Kanizsai
