= Ladislaus Garai =

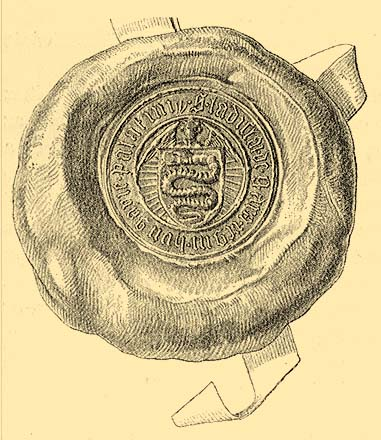
- Seal of Ladislaus Garai

Palatine of Hungary
- In office 1447–1458
- Monarchs: Ladislaus V, Matthias I
- Preceded by: Lawrence Hédervári
- Succeeded by: Michael Ország

Ban of Macsó
- In office 1431–1441
- Monarchs: Sigismund, Albert, Vladislaus I
- Preceded by: Stephen Újlaki
- Succeeded by: Desiderius Garay
- In office 1445–1447
- Monarch: Ladislaus V
- Preceded by: Emeric Hédervári
- Succeeded by: Stephen Bebek

Personal details
- Born: c. 1410
- Died: 1459
- Parent(s): Nicholas II Garai (father); Anna of Celje (mother)

Ladislaus Garai, also Ladislas Garai, (Hungarian: Garai László; c. 1410 – February or April 1459) was Palatine of Hungary from 1447 to 1458, and Ban of Macsó between 1431 and 1441 and from 1445 and 1447.

== Childhood ==
Ladislaus was the son of Nicholas Garai, Palatine of Hungary and his wife, Anna of Celje. His father was a most powerful baron in the Kingdom of Hungary in the reign of King Sigismund. Ladislaus's mother—a daughter of Hermann II, Count of Celje—was the sister of King Sigismund's wife, Barbara of Celje. Ladislaus was born around 1410, but he was first mentioned in a royal charter of 1424.

== Family ==
Ancestors of Ladislaus Garai

16. Stephen Dorozsma
8. Andrew Garai
4. Nicholas I Garai
18. Ladislaus Nevnai
9. N. Nevnai
19. Yolanda Kórógyi
2. Nicholas II Garai
1. Ladislaus Garai
24. Frederick I of Celje
12. Hermann I of Celje
6. Hermann II of Celje
13. Catherine of Bosnia
3. Anna of Celje

== Sources ==
- Árvai, Tünde (2013). "A házasságok szerepe a Garaiak hatalmi törekvéseiben [The role of marriages in the Garais' attempts to rise]". In Fedeles, Tamás; Font, Márta; Kiss, Gergely (eds.). Kor-Szak-Határ (in Hungarian). Pécsi Tudományegyetem. pp. 103–118. ISBN 978-963-642-518-0.
- Engel, Pál (2001). The Realm of St Stephen: A History of Medieval Hungary, 895–1526. I.B. Tauris Publishers. ISBN 1-86064-061-3.
- Fügedi, Erik (2004). Uram, királyom... (in Hungarian). Fekete Sas Kiadó. ISBN 963935264-0.
- Kubinyi, András (2008). Matthias Rex. Balassi Kiadó. ISBN 978-963-506-767-1.
- Markó, László (2000). A magyar állam főméltóságai Szent Istvántól napjainkig: Életrajzi Lexikon [Great Officers of State in Hungary from King Saint Stephen to Our Days: A Biographical Encyclopedia] (in Hungarian). Magyar Könyvklub. ISBN 963-547-085-1.
- Mureşanu, Camil (2001). John Hunyadi: Defender of Christendom. The Center for Romanian Studies. ISBN 973-9432-18-2.
- Štih, Peter (2010). The Middle Ages between the Eastern Alps and the Northern Adriatic: Select Papers on Slovene Historiography and Medieval History. BRILL. ISBN 978-90-04-18591-3.

Ladislaus House of Garay Born: c. 1410 Died: 1459
Political offices
Preceded by Peter Cseh de Léva	Ban of Macsó alongside Desiderius Garai (1431–1438) and Nicholas Újlaki (1438–1441); 1431–1441	Succeeded by Nicholas Újlaki; Ladislaus Maróti
Preceded by Emeric Hédervári	Ban of Macsó; 1445–1447	Succeeded by Stephen Bebek; John Kórógyi
Preceded by Lawrence Hédervári	Palatine of Hungary; 1447–1458	Succeeded by Michael Ország
