= Ladislaus the Posthumous =

Habsburg ruler from 1440 to 1457

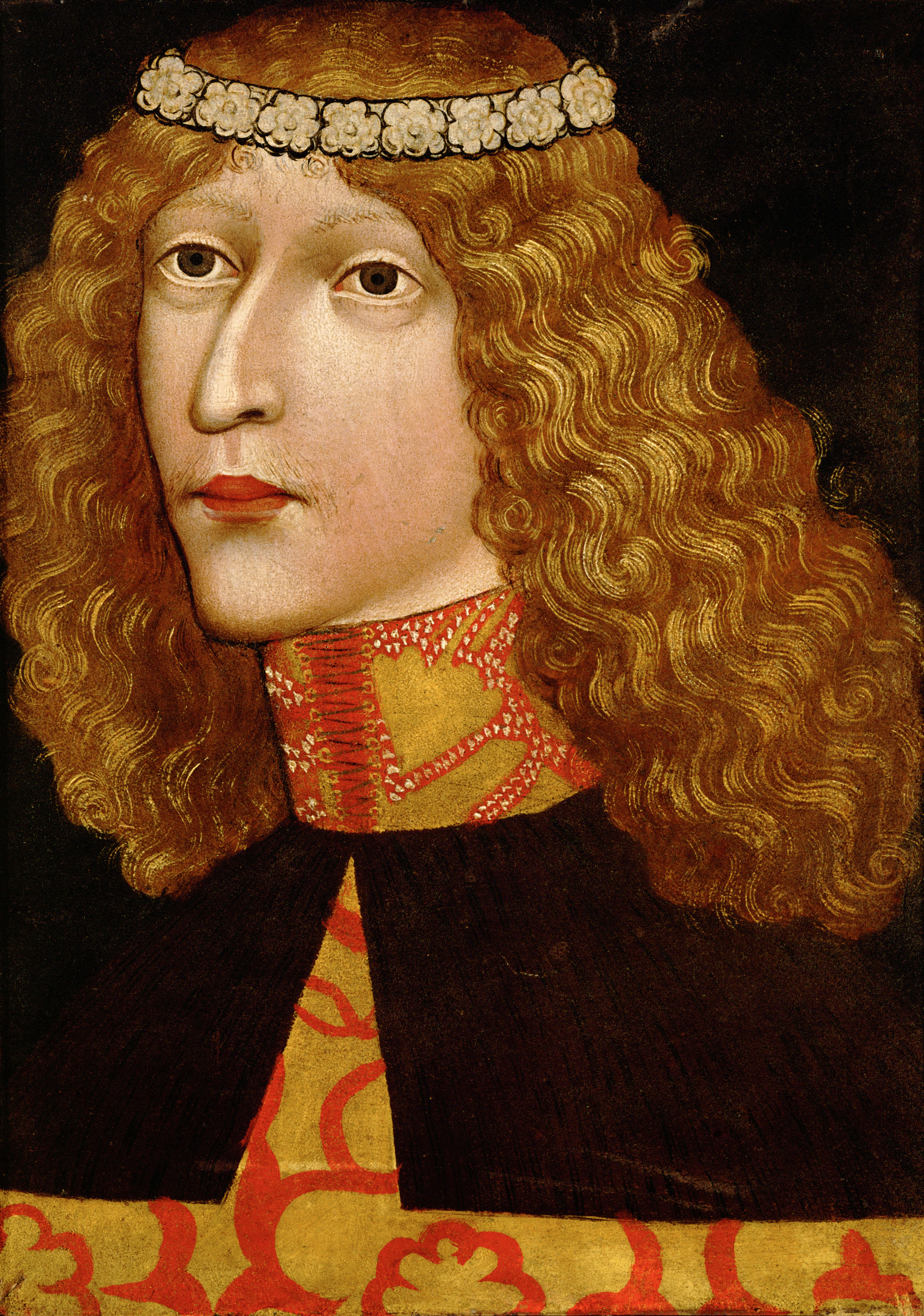
- Anonymous painting, 1457

Duke of Austria
- Reign: 22 February 1440 – 23 November 1457
- Predecessor: Albert V
- Successor: Frederick V
- Regent: Frederick V (1440–1452)

King of Hungary and Croatia
- Reign: 15 May 1440 – 23 November 1457
- Coronation: 15 May 1440
- Predecessor: Albert
- Successor: Matthias Corvinus
- Regents: Elizabeth of Luxembourg (1440–1442); John Hunyadi (1446–1453)

King of Bohemia
- Reign: 28 October 1453 – 23 November 1457
- Coronation: 28 October 1453
- Predecessor: Albert
- Successor: George of Poděbrady
- Regent: George of Poděbrady (1453–1457)
- Born: 22 February 1440; Komárom, Kingdom of Hungary
- Died: 23 November 1457 (aged 17); Prague, Kingdom of Bohemia
- Burial: St. Vitus Cathedral
- House: Habsburg
- Father: Albert II of Germany
- Mother: Elizabeth of Luxembourg

Ladislaus the Posthumous, known as Ladislaus V (Hungarian: Utószülött László; Croatian: Ladislav Posmrtni; Czech: Ladislav Pohrobek; German: Ladislaus Postumus; 22 February 1440 – 23 November 1457), was Duke of Austria and King of Hungary, Croatia and Bohemia. He was the posthumous son of Albert II of Germany with Elizabeth of Luxembourg. Albert had bequeathed all his realms to his future son on his deathbed, but only the estates of Austria accepted his last will. Fearing an Ottoman invasion, the majority of the Hungarian lords and prelates offered the crown to Władysław III of Poland. The Hussite noblemen and towns of Bohemia did not acknowledge the hereditary right of Albert's descendants to the throne, but also did not elect a new king.

After Ladislaus's birth, his mother seized the Holy Crown of Hungary and had Ladislaus crowned king in Székesfehérvár on 15 May 1440. However, the Diet of Hungary declared Ladislaus's coronation invalid and elected Władysław III of Poland as king. A civil war broke out, which lasted for years. Elizabeth appointed her late husband's distant cousin, Albert VI, Archduke of Austria, as her child's guardian. However, as a representative of the interests of the Austrian and Hungarian estates, he could not defend himself against his older brother and rival, Frederick III, King of the Romans, who in turn took over his role as guardian of Ladislaus. Albert had to renounce his guardianship and, in return, received the mighty Hungarian border Forchtenstein Castle, including a principality in the Hungarian-Styrian-Carinthian area. Ladislaus lived at Frederick's court (mainly in Wiener Neustadt), where Aeneas Silvius Piccolomini (later Pope Pius II) wrote a treatise on his upbringing.

After his mother died in late 1442, Ladislaus's interests were represented by a Czech condottiere, John Jiskra of Brandýs, in Hungary, and by the Czech Catholic lord, Oldřich II of Rosenberg, in Bohemia. Ladislaus's rival in Hungary, Władysław III, fell in the Battle of Varna in November 1444. The next year, the Diet of Hungary offered to acknowledge Ladislaus as king if Frederick III renounced his guardianship. After Frederick III rejected the offer, the Diet of Hungary elected John Hunyadi regent in 1446. In Bohemia, the head of the moderate Hussites (or Utraquists), George of Poděbrady, took control of Prague in 1448. The Estates of Austria forced Frederick III to resign the guardianship and hand over Ladislaus to them in September 1452. Royal administration was formally restored in Hungary after Hunyadi resigned the regency in early 1453, but he continued to control most royal castles and revenues.

Ulrich II, Count of Celje (his mother's cousin), became Ladislaus's main advisor, but an Austrian baron, Ulrich von Eytzinger, forced Ladislaus to expel Celje from his court. Although Ladislaus was crowned king of Bohemia on 28 October 1453, Poděbrady remained in full control of the government. During the following years, Eytzinger, Hunyadi and Poděbrady closely cooperated to mutually secure their positions. Ladislaus was reconciled with Ulrich II in early 1455. With the support of the leading Hungarian barons, Ladislaus persuaded Hunyadi to withdraw his troops from most royal castles and renounce the administration of part of the royal revenues.

After the Ottoman Sultan Mehmed II decided to invade Hungary, Ladislaus and Ulrich II left the kingdom. The sultan laid siege to Belgrade. Hunyadi relieved the fortress on 22 July 1456, but he died two weeks later. Ladislaus and Ulrich II returned to Hungary and tried to force Hunyadi's son, also named Ladislaus, to renounce all royal castles and revenues, but Ladislaus Hunyadi murdered Ulrich II on 9 November, forcing Ladislaus to grant an amnesty to him. However, most Hungarian barons were hostile towards Ladislaus Hunyadi. With their support, Ladislaus captured him and his brother, Matthias Corvinus. After Ladislaus Hunyadi was executed in March 1457, his relatives stirred up a rebellion against Ladislaus, forcing him to flee from Hungary. Ladislaus died unexpectedly in Prague. He was the last male member of the Albertinian Line of the House of Habsburg.

== Life ==
=== Parentage and birth ===
Ladislaus was the posthumous son of Albert II of Germany and Elizabeth of Luxembourg. Albert II was the hereditary duke of Austria, while Elizabeth was the only child of Emperor Sigismund, who was also king of Bohemia and Hungary. Sigismund had mortgaged the Duchy of Luxembourg to his niece, Elizabeth of Görlitz. He wanted to secure his realms for both his daughter and her husband, but the Estates of Bohemia and Hungary did not acknowledge the couple's hereditary right to rule. After Sigismund died in December 1437, Albert was elected the sole king of Hungary. In Bohemia, Albert was unanimously elected king only after he defeated Casimir IV Jagiellon – the younger brother of Władysław III of Poland – who was supported by a group of Hussite lords and burghers.

Albert was planning to launch a military expedition against the Ottoman Turks, who had been making plundering raids in the southern regions of Hungary, but fell seriously ill during the preparations. The dying king, who knew that his wife was pregnant, willed Austria, Bohemia and Hungary to his posthumous child if his wife gave birth to a son. He also put the potential heir under the guardianship of his widow and his cousin, Frederick of Austria Albert II died on 27 October 1439.

Fearing a new Ottoman invasion of Hungary, the majority of the Hungarian lords and prelates refused to accept the deceased king's last will. They offered the crown to Władysław III of Poland and wanted to persuade the pregnant queen dowager to marry the new king. In Bohemia, the assembly of the Estates passed decrees in January 1440 to avoid having a new civil war break out between the Hussites and the Catholics before a new king was elected. The Estates of Moravia passed a similar decree.

Although the 31-year-old Elizabeth seemingly agreed to marry Vladislaus, who was only 16, she made preparations for the coronation of her son after her physicians predicted that she would have a son. She ordered her chambermaid, Helene Kottanner, to steal the Holy Crown of Hungary from the castle of Visegrád. Before long, Helene Kottanner and her accomplice seized the crown. They handed it to the queen on the very day she went into labour, which was considered a miracle by both the queen and her courtiers. Elizabeth gave birth to Ladislaus in Komárom (now Komárno in Slovakia) on 21 February 1440, almost four months after his father's death. He was named for King St Ladislaus. Dénes Szécsi, Archbishop of Esztergom, baptised him.

=== Inheritance and civil war ===
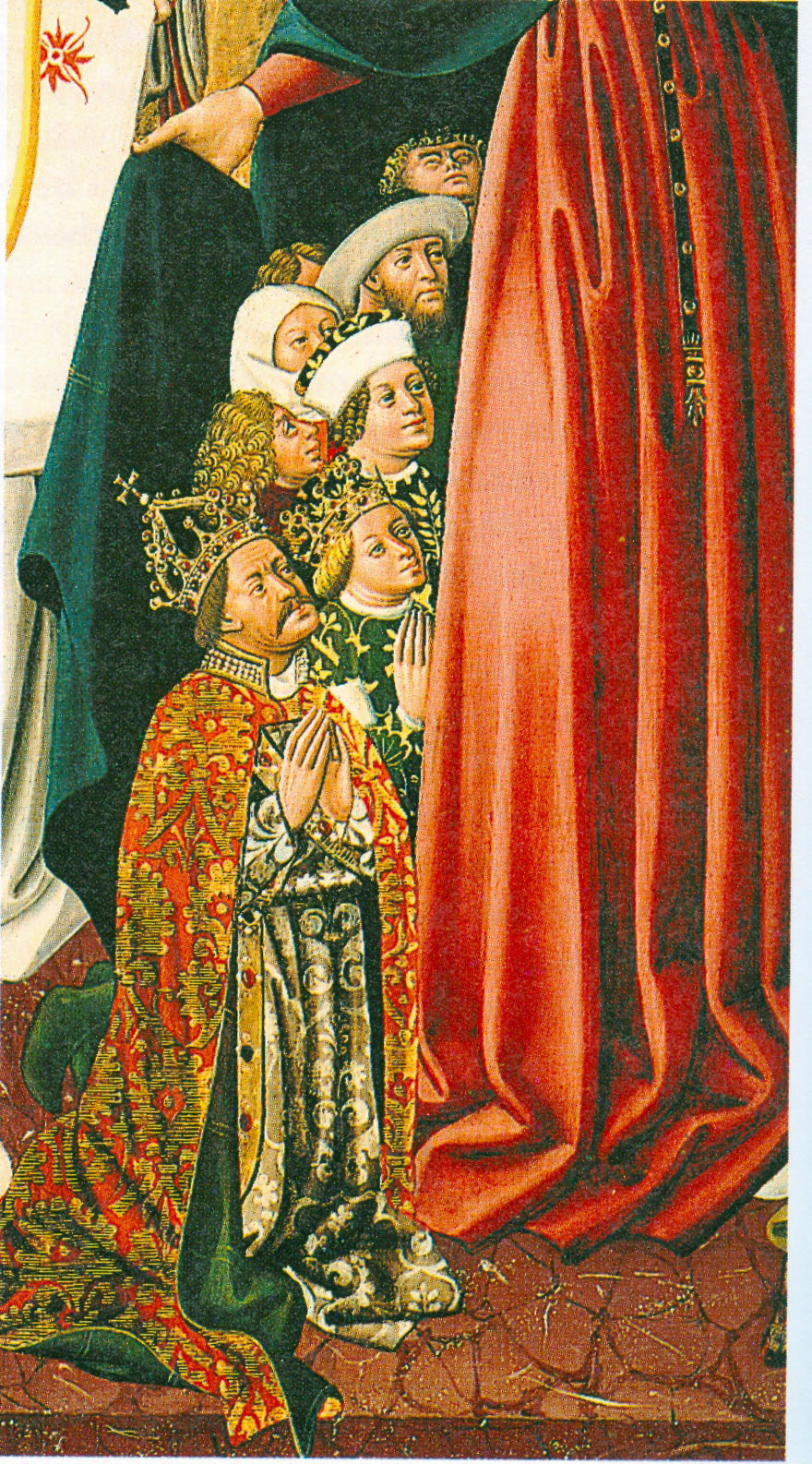
Ladislaus's parents, Albert II of Germany and Elizabeth of Luxembourg pray

The Estates of the Duchy of Austria acknowledged Ladislaus's right to rule and made Frederick of Austria, who had been elected King of the Romans, regent in accordance with the last will of Ladislaus's father. In Bohemia, only the Catholic lords, who were under the leadership of Oldřich II of Rosenberg, were willing to accept Ladislaus's hereditary right to rule. Soon after the birth of her son, Queen Elizabeth sent envoys to Poland to persuade the delegates of the Hungarian Estates to break off their negotiations with Władysław III of Poland. However, the Hungarian lords refused and elected Władysław III king on 8 March 1440. Before his election, Władysław III had pledged that he would marry Queen Elizabeth and protect her infant son's interests in Austria and Bohemia.

The queen refused to give her consent to the project and decided to have her son crowned king before Władysław III came to Hungary. She hastily took Ladislaus from Komárom to Székesfehérvár, which was the traditional place of the royal coronations in Hungary. After a young lord, Nicholas of Ilok, symbolically knighted the infant Ladislaus, Archbishop Dénes Szécsi anointed and crowned him king on 15 May. During the lengthy ceremonies, his mother's cousin, Ulrich II, Count of Celje, held the crown over the head of Ladislaus, who burst into tears while the coronation oath was being read out on his behalf. Six days later Władysław III entered Buda. Queen Elizabeth fled first to Győr, and from there to Sopron, taking the infant king with her.

The most powerful lords – including Ladislaus Garai, Đurađ Branković, Frederick II, Count of Celje, and Ulrich II, Count of Celje – and most towns remained faithful to the child-king, but most noblemen preferred Władysław III's rule in the hope that he would be able to lead the defence of the kingdom against the Ottomans. A civil war broke out between the partisans of the two kings, which would last for years. The Diet declared Ladislaus's coronation invalid on 29 June 1440, stating that "the crowning of kings is always dependent on the will of the kingdom's inhabitants, in whose consent both the effectiveness and the force of the crown reside". On 17 July, Archbishop Dénes Szécsi crowned Władysław III king with a crown taken from the tomb of King Saint Stephen, the first king of Hungary.

In need of financial resources to continue the war against Władysław III, Queen Elizabeth signed a treaty with Frederick III, King of the Romans, in Wiener Neustadt on 22 November. She not only mortgaged Sopron to Frederick III, but also appointed him as her son's guardian and gave the Holy Crown of Hungary to him. Thereafter, Ladislaus lived in Frederick III's court, mainly in Wiener Neustadt.

Queen Elizabeth hired a Czech condottiere, John Jiskra of Brandýs, who took control of Kassa (now Košice in Slovakia) and a dozen other towns in Upper Hungary during the next months. However, Władysław III's two military commanders, Nicholas of Ilok and John Hunyadi, defeated the united army of the child Ladislaus's supporters from the central and southern parts of Hungary in the Battle of Bátaszék in early 1441. During the next months, Władysław III and his commanders took control of the western and eastern territories of Hungary, but John Jiskra of Brandýs and Queen Elizabeth's other supporters continued to control Upper Hungary, along with Esztergom, Győr, Pressburg (now Bratislava in Slovakia) and other important towns. Negotiations began and Queen Elizabeth and Władysław III signed a peace treaty in Győr on 13 December 1442. The queen recognised Władysław III as king, but preserved her son's claim to the throne. Three or four days later the queen suddenly died and Ladislaus became an orphan before his third birthday.

=== Wardship ===
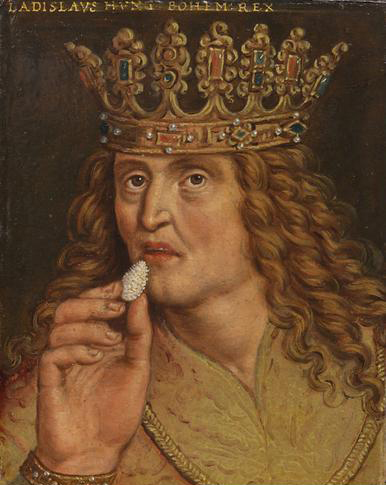
Ladislaus the Posthumous

After the death of Ladislaus's mother, his claim to rule in Hungary and Bohemia was primarily protected by John Jiskra of Brandýs and Ulrich of Rosenberg, respectively. Most parts of Hungary remained under the rule of Ladislaus's rival, Władysław III. In Bohemia, the moderate Hussite lord, Hynce Ptáček of Pirkštejn, administered the eastern territories, and the towns dominated by the radical Taborites were united in a league. The Hussite Ctibor Tovačovský of Cimburk, who had assumed the title of governor after Albert's death, continued to administer Moravia, closely cooperating with the towns and the Catholic Bishop of Olomouc. Philip the Good, Duke of Burgundy, whom Elizabeth of Görlitz made her heir, invaded Luxembourg on her behalf in 1443. Frederick III authorised the Estates of Luxemburg to pay homage to Philip the Good, but he also stipulated that Ladislaus could buy back the duchy after Elizabeth of Goerlitz's death. During Ladislaus's lifetime, the Luxembourgeoise Estates did not recognise Philip the Good as their legitimate sovereign.

Ladislaus's rival, Władysław III, presumably died fighting against the Ottomans in the Battle of Varna on 10 November 1444. At the Diet of next year, the Hungarian Estates agreed that they would acknowledge the child Ladislaus as king if Władysław III, whose fate was still uncertain, did not come back to Hungary before 1 June 1445. However, they stipulated that they would elect a new king if the child king's guardian, Frederick III, did not release both the king and the Holy Crown of Hungary. The Estates also elected seven "Captains in Chief" – John Hunyadi, Nicholas of Ilok, George Rozgonyi, Emeric Bebek, Michael Ország, Pancrace Szentmiklósi, and John Jiskra of Brandýs – to administer the kingdom. Frederick III stormed into Hungary and captured a dozen fortresses along the western frontiers of Hungary, including Kőszeg, by the end of July. The Counts of Celje, who were related to Ladislaus through his mother, invaded Slavonia and took control of the province before the end of the year. As Frederick III refused to release Ladislaus, the Diet of Hungary elected John Hunyadi regent for the period of Ladislaus's minority on 6 June 1446. John Hunyadi, who adopted the title governor, ruled most of Hungary, but could not expand his authority over the regions under the rule of Frederick III, John Jiskra of Brandýs and the Counts of Celje. The envoys of the Hungarian Estates and Frederick III signed a truce on 1 June 1446, which confirmed Frederick III's guardianship over Ladislaus.

In Bohemia, George of Poděbrady took up the leadership of the moderate Hussite lords after the death of Hynce Ptáček of Pirkštejn. He captured Prague on 3 September 1448 and imprisoned Meinhard of Neuhaus who had started negotiations of the moderate Hussites' union with the Catholic Church. Early the next year, Oldřich II of Rosenberg and other Catholic lords entered into a formal league against George of Poděbrady.

Ladislaus had a good education in Frederick III's court. A Latin grammar was completed especially for him. Aeneas Silvius Piccolomini (the future Pope Pius II) summarised his advice on education in a letter that he addressed to the ten-year-old Ladislaus in 1450. Piccolomini suggested that Ladislaus should read both classical authors (including Archimedes, Cicero, Livy and Vergil) and the Bible. He also emphasised the importance of physical training, stating that "both mind and body [...] must be developed side by side".

As regards a boy's physical training, we must bear in mind that we aim at implanting habits which will prove beneficial through life. So let him cultivate a certain hardness which rejects excess of sleep and idleness in all its forms. Habits of indulgence – such as the luxury of soft beds, or the wearing of silk instead of linen next the skin – tend to enervate both body and mind [...] Childish habits of playing with the lips and features should be controlled early. A boy should be taught to hold his head erect, to look straight and fearlessly before him and to bear himself with dignity whether walking, standing or sitting [...] Every youth destined for an exalted position should further be trained in military exercises. It will be your destiny to defend Christendom against the Turk. It will thus be an essential part of your education that you be early taught the use of the bow, of the sling, and of the spear; that you drive, ride, leap and swim. These are honourable accomplishments in everyone, and therefore not unworthy of the educator's care [...] Games, too, should be encouraged for young children – the ball, the hoop – but these must not be rough and coarse, but have in them an element of skill [...] In respect of eating and drinking, the rule of moderation consists in rejecting everything which needlessly taxes digestion and so impairs mental activity. At the same time, fastidiousness must not be humoured. A boy, for instance, whose lot it may be to face life in the camp, or in the forest, should so discipline his appetite that he may eat even beef. The aim of eating is to strengthen the frame; so let vigorous health reject cakes or sweets, elaborate dishes of small birds or eels, which are for the delicate and the weakly [...] As regards the use of wine, remember that we drink to quench thirst, and that the limit of moderation is reached when the edge of the intellect is dulled. A boy should be brought up to avoid wine; for he possesses a store of natural moisture in the blood and so rarely experiences thirst.

— Aeneas Silvius Piccolomini: On the Education of Children

John Hunyadi signed a peace treaty with Frederick III on 22 October 1450. They agreed that Ladislaus would remain under Frederick III's guardianship until his eighteenth birthday, and during Ladislaus's minority, John Hunyadi would administer Hungary. Their agreement stirred up discontent among the Austrian Estates, because the age of majority was twelve or sixteen, according to local customs. The Austrian lords tried to prevent Ladislaus from accompanying his guardian to Italy in late 1451. However, Frederick took Ladislaus with him to Rome where Frederick was crowned Holy Roman Emperor. After their return from Italy, Emperor Frederick again refused to renounce the guardianship of Ladislaus, provoking the Austrian Estates to rise up in open rebellion in early 1452. The representatives of the Austrian and Hungarian Estates, and the Bohemian Catholic lords, signed a treaty in Vienna on 5 March against Emperor Frederick, but he refused to hand over Ladislaus to them. On the other hand, the emperor assisted George of Poděbrady in gaining the newly established office of governor in Bohemia in April. The rebellious Austrian lords laid siege to Wiener Neustadt, forcing Emperor Frederick III to hand over Ladislaus to Ulrich II, Count of Celje on 4 September.

=== Reign ===
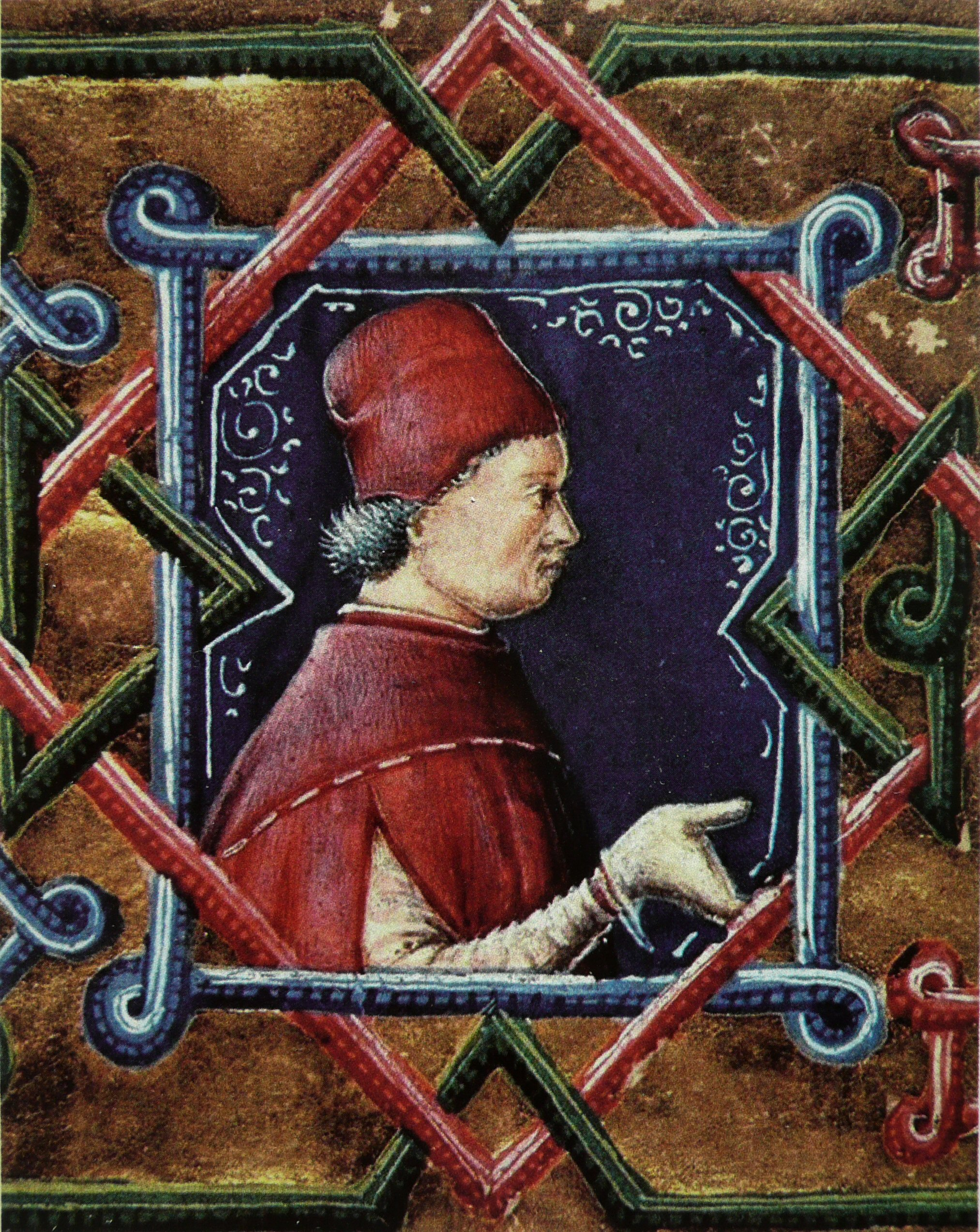
John Vitéz, Bishop of Várad (now Oradea in Romania), who was Ladislaus's secret chancellor in Hungary

Ulrich II, Count of Celje accompanied Ladislaus to Vienna but only after "washing the Styrian filth off him" to symbolise the liberation of Ladislaus from the "Styrian" Frederick III's influence. Ladislaus Garai and Nicholas of Ilok visited Ladislaus in Vienna in October, and John Hunyadi also joined them before the end of the year. Hunyadi resigned from the governorship early the next year. Ladislaus made Hunyadi "captain general of the kingdom", authorising him to retain all royal castles that were in his possession at the time of his resignation, and to continue administering royal revenues. Hunyadi was only to pay 24,000 gold florins to the sovereign in each year. During a debate between the representatives of the Austrian and Hungarian Estates about his future seat, Ladislaus declared that he was Hungarian and wanted to live in Hungary, according to Aeneas Sylvius Piccolomini.

On 29 January 1453 in Pressburg, the Diet of Hungary acknowledged Ladislaus's position as the lawful king without a formal election or a new coronation. He declared an amnesty for those who had supported Władysław III against him. Although all grants that Queen Elizabeth and King Vladislaus had made were annulled, Ladislaus issued new charters of grant for the grantees to confirm their proprietary rights. The greater chancellery and the secret chancellery (two important offices of central administration, which had not functioned for a decade) were restored under the direction of Archbishop Dénes Szécsi and John Vitéz, Bishop of Várad (now Oradea in Romania). The central courts of justice (the Court of Royal Special Presence and the Court of Personal Presence) also started functioning again.

Ladislaus returned to Vienna shortly after the Diet was closed. During the next months, Ulrich II of Celje was Ladislaus's most influential advisor. Celje signed a treaty with George of Poděbrady on 16 April and persuaded Ladislaus to confirm Poděbrady's position as governor in Bohemia. Ulrich II of Celje also signed a treaty with Archbishop Dénes Szécsi, Ladislaus Garai, Nicholas of Ilok, and other Hungarian lords on 13 September, who promised to support him against his opponents. Their league was implicitly formed against John Hunyadi and Ulrich Eytzinger, the head of the Estates in Austria, who had long been hostile towards Ulrich II of Celje. Fifteen days later, Ulrich Eytzinger persuaded Ladislaus to expel Ulrich II of Celje from his court at an assembly of the Estates of Austria.

Ladislaus was crowned king of Bohemia in Prague on 28 October 1453, which put an end to the long interregnum. Ulrich Eytzinger, John Hunyadi, and George Poděbrady, who were all present at Ladislaus's coronation, signed a treaty. Ladislaus stayed in Prague during the next twelve months. George Poděbrady hindered him from consulting with his Austrian and Hungarian advisors, and even the royal seal was taken from Ladislaus. At the next Diet of Hungary, Bishop John Vitéz submitted a proposal on the king's behalf to the Estates, demanding the centralisation of the administration of royal revenues, but the Diet refused the proposal, which would have limited John Hunyadi's authority. According to the document prepared by the bishop on this occasion, Ladislaus's cash revenues amounted to 216,000 florins. Historian János M. Bak writes that the amount would have only covered about 85% of the expenses of a military expedition against the Ottoman Turks, who had captured Constantinople and planned to invade Hungary.

Ladislaus left Prague in late November 1454. He visited Silesia and Moravia, where the local Estates paid homage to him. After Ladislaus arrived in Moravia, Ctibor Tovačovský himself appointed Czech Catholic noblemen as royal officials, ensuring their loyalty towards him. Ladislaus returned to Vienna on 16 February 1455. Taking advantage of Ulrich Eytzinger's growing unpopularity among the Austrian noblemen, Ulrich II of Celje persuaded Ladislaus to restore him to his court. On 20 February, Ulrich II triumphally returned to Vienna and vigorously reasserted his role as the young king's main advisor for Austrian affairs. Ladislaus visited Buda and persuaded Hunyadi to resign a part of the royal revenues and withdraw his garrisons from Buda, Diósgyőr and other royal castles. Ulrich II of Celje also renewed his alliance with Ladislaus Garai and Nicholas of Ilok on 7 April.

The newly elected Pope Callixtus III declared a crusade against the Ottoman Turks, who had occupied the greater part of Serbia. News of Sultan Mehmed II's preparations for invasion reached Hungary in autumn 1455. Ladislaus came to Hungary in February 1456. He held a Diet in March that proclaimed general mobilisation and consented to an extraordinary tax to cover the expenditures of the defense of the country. In April, Ladislaus borrowed 8,000 florins from Hunyadi, because the king had to pay off half of his former debt to Ulrich II of Celje. Before the sultan's army reached the southern border of Hungary, Ladislaus left Hungary and returned to Vienna.

Sultan Mehmed II laid siege to Belgrade in early July 1456. With the assistance of thousands of commoners whom John of Capistrano, a Franciscan friar, had stirred up to join the crusade against the Ottomans, John Hunyadi prevented the besiegers from completing the blockade and relieved Belgrade on 22 July. Two weeks later, Hunyadi died of an epidemic that broke out in Belgrade.

Ladislaus returned to Hungary in September. Ulrich II of Celje accompanied him at the head of an army of German crusaders who had assembled near Vienna. Ladislaus made Ulrich II of Celje "captain general". They also decided to reclaim all royal castles and revenues that Hunyadi had held from his son, Ladislaus Hunyadi. The young Hunyadi seemingly yielded to the king at their meeting in Futak (now Futog in Serbia) and invited Ladislaus and Ulrich II of Celje to Belgrade, but after the king and the Count of Celje entered the fortress, Hunyadi's soldiers attacked and murdered the count on 9 November. The royal army soon disbanded, and the king found himself captive. He accompanied Hunyadi to Temesvár (now Timișoara in Romania), which was an important center of the Hunyadi domains. Hunyadi only allowed the king to leave Temesvár after Ladislaus made him captain general and pledged that he would not take revenge for Ulrich II of Celje's murder.

From Temesvár, Ladislaus went to Buda. He soon realised that the majority of the Hungarian barons were hostile towards Ladislaus Hunyadi. Upon the advice of Ladislaus Garai, the king convinced Ladislaus Hunyadi, who had also arrived in the capital, to persuade his younger brother, the fourteen-year-old Matthias Corvinus, to join him in Buda. As soon as Matthias arrived on 14 March 1457, Ladislaus had the two Hunyadis imprisoned. Sitting in the royal council, the barons of the realm condemned the Hunyadi brothers to death for high treason, and Ladislaus Hunyadi was beheaded on 16 March. The Hunyadi brothers' mother, Elizabeth Szilágyi, and her brother, Michael Szilágyi, rebelled against the king, which caused a civil war between the lords loyal to the king and the supporters of the Hunyadi family. Ladislaus appointed John Jiskra of Brandýs to be the commander of the royal army and left Hungary for Vienna, dragging the captive Matthias Corvinus with him in early June.

From Vienna, Ladislaus went to Prague, where he unexpectedly died on 23 November 1457. Although his contemporaries suspected that the young king was poisoned, the examination of his skeleton suggests that he fell victim either to bubonic plague or to leukemia. He was buried in the St. Vitus Cathedral in Prague.

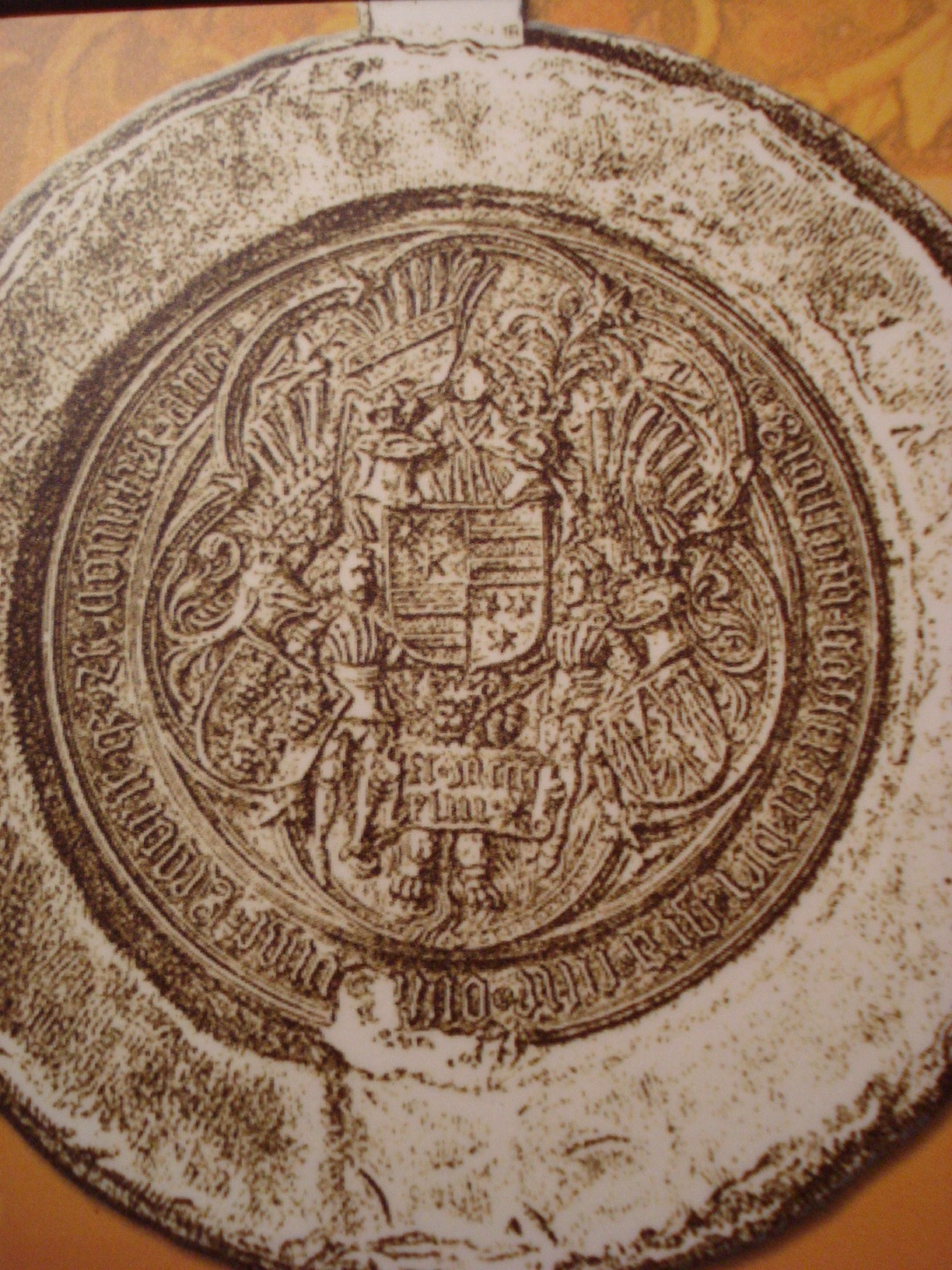
The seal of Ulrich II, Count of Celje, who was Ladislaus's kisman and close advisor

19th century depiction of Ladislaus's 1453 entry into Prague, by Czech history painter Adolf Liebscher

On His Deathbed, Ladislaus the Posthumous Offers His Thanks to George of Poděbrady, painting by Jan Škramlík, late 19th or early 20th century

Modern sarcophagus of Ladislaus the Posthumous

== Family ==
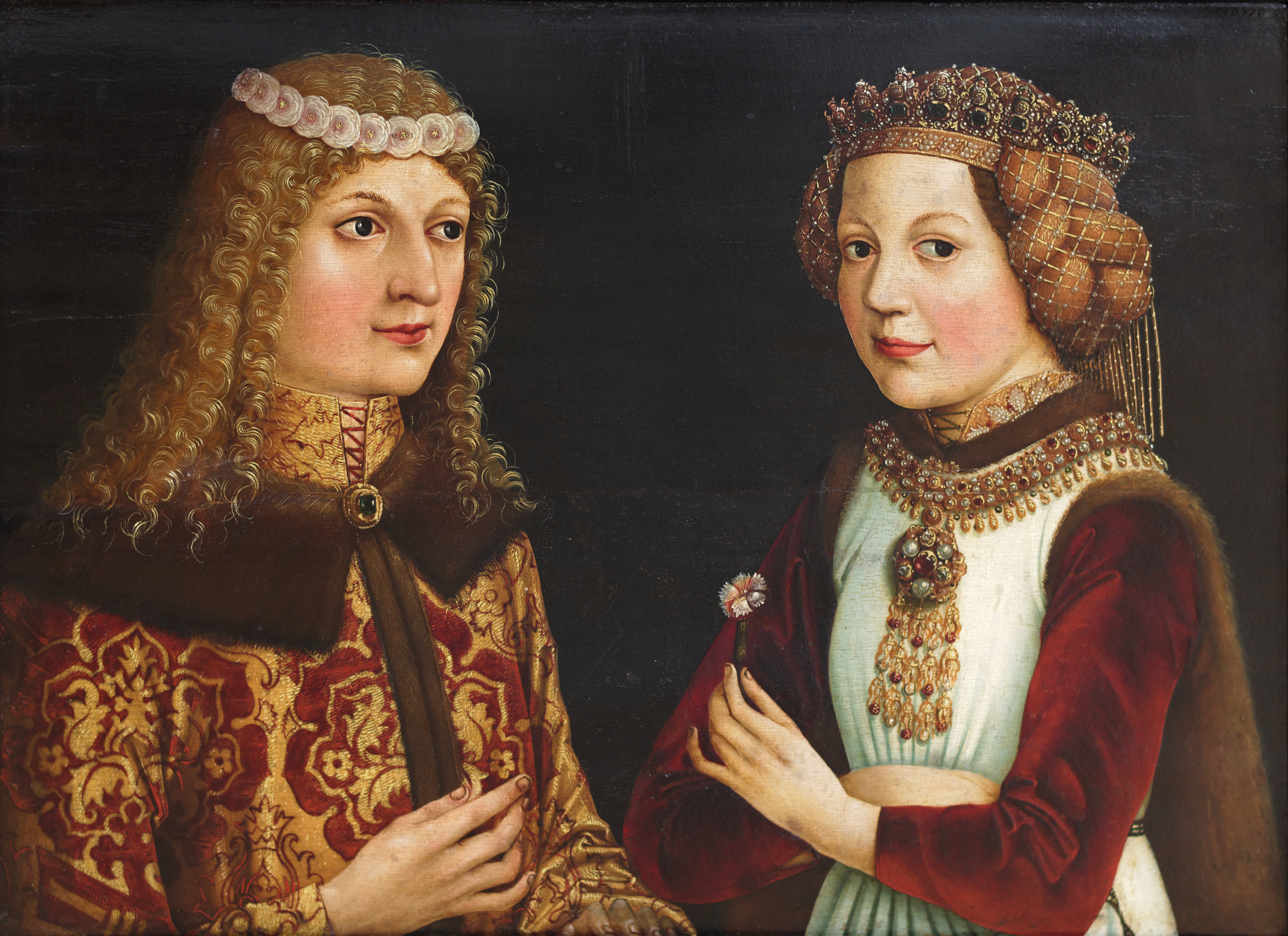
Betrothal portrait of Ladislaus and Madeleine of Valois, c. 1457

Ladislaus never married. After his arrival in Prague in autumn 1457, he asked for the hand of Madeleine of Valois, daughter of Charles VII of France. Charles VII accepted that proposal, but Ladislaus had died by the time the marriage contract was signed by his envoys in Paris. With Ladislaus's death, the "Albertinian Line" of the House of Habsburg became extinct. Emperor Frederick III and his brother, Albert VI, Archduke of Austria, jointly succeeded him in Austria. In Hungary, Matthias Corvinus was elected king two months after Ladislaus's death. George of Poděbrady was elected king of Bohemia on 3 March 1458.

=== Ancestry ===
Ancestors of Ladislaus the Posthumous

8. Albert III, Duke of Austria
4. Albert IV, Duke of Austria
9. Beatrice of Nuremberg
2. Albert II of Germany
10. Albert I, Duke of Bavaria
5. Joanna Sophia of Bavaria
11. Margaret of Brieg
1. Ladislaus the Posthumous
12. Charles IV, Holy Roman Emperor
6. Sigismund, Holy Roman Emperor
13. Elizabeth of Pomerania
3. Elizabeth of Luxembourg
14. Hermann II, Count of Celje
7. Barbara of Cilli
15. Anna of Schaunberg

== Male-line family tree ==
House of Habsburg

Original line
Albert; Count of Habsburg c. 1188–1239
Rudolf I of Germany c. 1218–1291
Albert I of Germany; 1255–1308	Hartmann; 1263–1281	Rudolf II; Duke of Austria; 1270–1290
Rudolf I of Bohemia; 1281–1307	Frederick the Fair c. 1289–1330	Leopold I Duke of Austria; 1290–1326	Albert II; Duke of Austria; 1298–1358	Henry the Friendly; 1299–1327	Otto; Duke of Austria; 1301–1339	John; Parricida c. 1290–1312/1313
Albertinian line	Leopoldian line
Rudolf IV; Duke of Austria; 1339–1365	Frederick III; 1347–1362	Albert III; Duke of Austria; 1349–1395	Leopold III; Duke of Austria; 1351–1386	Frederick II; Duke of Austria; 1327–1344	Leopold II; Duke of Austria; 1328–1344
Albert IV; Duke of Austria; 1377–1404	William; Duke of Austria c. 1370–1406	Leopold IV; Duke of Austria; 1371–1411	Ernest; Duke of Austria; 1377–1424	Frederick IV; Duke of Austria; 1382–1439
Albert II of Germany; 1397–1439	Frederick III; HRE; 1415–1493	Albert VI; Archduke of Austria; 1418–1463	Sigismund; Archduke of Austria; 1427–1496
Ladislaus the Posthumous; 1440–1457	Maximilian I HRE; 1459–1519
Philip I of Castile; 1478–1506
Spanish / Iberian line	Austrian / HRE line
Charles V HRE; 1500–1558	Ferdinand I HRE; 1503–1564
Philip II of Spain; 1527–1598	Maximilian II; HRE; 1527–1576	Ferdinand II; Archduke of Austria; 1529–1595	Charles II; Archduke of Austria; 1540–1590
Carlos; Prince of Asturias; 1545–1568	Philip III of Spain; 1578–1621	Rudolf II; HRE; 1552–1612	Ernest of Austria; 1553–1595	Matthias; HRE; 1557–1619	Maximilian III; Archduke of Austria; 1558–1618	Albert VII; Archduke of Austria; 1559–1621	Wenceslaus; Archduke of Austria; 1561–1578	Andrew; Margrave of Burgau; 1558–1600	Charles; Margrave of Burgau; 1560–1618	Ferdinand II; HRE; 1578–1637	Maximilian Ernest of Austria; 1583–1616	Leopold V Archduke of Austria; 1586–1632	Charles of Austria; 1590–1624
Philip IV of Spain; 1605–1665	Charles of Austria; 1607–1632	Ferdinand of Austria; 1609–1641	John-Charles of Austria; 1605–1619	Ferdinand III; HRE; 1608–1657	Leopold Wilhelm of Austria; 1614–1662	Ferdinand Charles; Archduke of Austria; 1628–1662	Sigismund Francis; Archduke of Austria; 1630–1665
Balthasar Charles; Prince of Asturias; 1629–1646	Charles II of Spain; 1661–1700	Ferdinand IV; King of the Romans; 1633–1654	Leopold I HRE; 1640–1705	Charles Joseph of Austria; 1649–1664
Joseph I HRE; 1678–1711	Charles VI; HRE; 1685–1740
Lorraine
Maria Theresa; HRE; 1740–1780	Francis I HRE; 1745–1765
Habsburg-Lorraine
Joseph II; HRE; 1765–1790	Leopold II; HRE; 1790–1792
Francis II; HRE; 1792–1806

== See also ==
- Hofamterspiel

== Bibliography ==
- Agnew, Hugh (2004). The Czechs and the Lands of the Bohemian Crown. Hoover Institution. ISBN 978-0-8179-4492-6.
- Bain, Robert Nisbet (1911). "Ladislaus V." . In Chisholm, Hugh (ed.). Encyclopædia Britannica. Vol. 16 (11th ed.). Cambridge University Press. p. 60.
- Bak, János (1994). "The late medieval period, 1382–1526". In Sugár, Peter F.; Hanák, Péter; Frank, Tibor (eds.). A History of Hungary. Indiana University Press. pp. 54–82. ISBN 0-253-20867-X.
- Beller, Steven (2006). A Concise History of Austria. Cambridge University Press. ISBN 978-0-521-47886-1.
- Bartl, Július; Čičaj, Viliam; Kohútova, Mária; Letz, Róbert; Segeš, Vladimír; Škvarna, Dušan (2002). Slovak History: Chronology & Lexicon. Bolchazy-Carducci Publishers, Slovenské Pedegogické Nakladatel'stvo. ISBN 0-86516-444-4.
- Bijvoet, Maya C. (1987). "Helene Kottanner: The Austrian Chambermaid". In Wilson, Katharina M. (ed.). Women Writers of the Renaissance and Reformation. University of Georgia Press. pp. 327–349. ISBN 0-8203-0866-8.
- Engel, Pál (2001). The Realm of St Stephen: A History of Medieval Hungary, 895–1526. I.B. Tauris. ISBN 1-86064-061-3.
- Fine, John V. A (1994). The Late Medieval Balkans: A Critical Survey from the Late Twelfth Century to the Ottoman Conquest. University of Michigan Press. ISBN 0-472-08260-4.
- Kontler, László (1999). Millennium in Central Europe: A History of Hungary. Atlantisz Publishing House. ISBN 963-9165-37-9.
- Kubinyi, András (2008). Matthias Rex. Balassi Kiadó. ISBN 978-963-506-767-1.
- Langmaier, Konstantin (2015). Erzherzog Albrecht VI. von Österreich (1418–1463): ein Fürst im Spannungsfeld von Dynastie, Regionen und Reich [Albert VI of Austria (1418–1463): a Prince Caught Between Dynasty, Region and Empire] (Thesis). Forschungen zur Kaiser- und Papstgeschichte des Mittelalters, 38 [Research on the history of emperors and popes in the Middle Ages; 38] (in German). Köln, Weimar, Wien: Böhlau Verlag. ISBN 978-3-412-50139-6. OCLC 912079531.
- Mureşanu, Camil (2001). John Hunyadi: Defender of Christendom. The Center for Romanian Studies. ISBN 973-9432-18-2.
- Newcomer, James (1995). The Grand Duchy of Luxembourg: The Evolution of Nationhood. Editions Emile Borschette; Le Bon Livre. ISBN 2-87982-057-X.
- Pálosfalvi, Tamás (2002). "V. László". In Kristó, Gyula (ed.). Magyarország vegyes házi királyai [The Kings of Various Dynasties of Hungary] (in Hungarian). Szukits Könyvkiadó. pp. 139–150. ISBN 963-9441-58-9.
- Šmahel, František (2011). "The Hussite Revolution (1419–1471)". In Pánek, Jaroslav; Tůma, Oldřich (eds.). A History of the Czech Lands. Charles University. pp. 149–187. ISBN 978-80-246-1645-2.
- Solymosi, László; Körmendi, Adrienne (1981). "A középkori magyar állam virágzása és bukása, 1301–1526 [The Heyday and Fall of the Medieval Hungarian State, 1301–1526]". In Solymosi, László (ed.). Magyarország történeti kronológiája, I: a kezdetektől 1526-ig [Historical Chronology of Hungary, Volume I: From the Beginning to 1526] (in Hungarian). Akadémiai Kiadó. pp. 188–228. ISBN 963-05-2661-1.
- Spiesz, Anton; Caplovic, Dusan; Bolchazy, Ladislaus J. (2006). Illustrated Slovak History: A Struggle for Sovereignty in Central Europe. Bolchazy-Carducci Publishers. ISBN 978-0-86516-426-0.
- Štih, Peter (1999). "Ulrik II. Celjski in Ladislav Posmrtni ali Celjski grofje v ringu velike politike [Ulrich II. of Celje and Ladislas the Posthumous, or the Counts of Celje in the Ring of Great Power Politics]". In Štih, Peter (ed.). Spomini Helene Kottanner (in Slovenian). Založba Nove revije. pp. 11–46. ISBN 961-6017-83-7.
- Tringli, István (2012). "V. László". In Gujdár, Noémi; Szatmáry, Nóra (eds.). Magyar királyok nagykönyve: Uralkodóink, kormányzóink és az erdélyi fejedelmek életének és tetteinek képes története [Encyclopedia of the Kings of Hungary: An Illustrated History of the Life and Deeds of Our Monarchs, Regents and the Princes of Transylvania] (in Hungarian). Reader's Digest. pp. 138–139. ISBN 978-963-289-214-6.

Ladislaus the Posthumous House of Habsburg Born: 22 February 1440 Died: 23 November 1457
Regnal titles
Vacant Title last held by Albert II of Germany	Archduke of Austria; 1440 – 1457	Succeeded by Frederick III, Holy Roman Emperor; Albert VI, Archduke of Austria
Vacant Title last held by Albert II of Germany	King of Hungary and Croatia; 1440 – 1457 with Vladislaus I of Hungary as contender (1440 – 1444)	Vacant Title next held by Matthias Corvinus
Vacant Title last held by Albert II of Germany	King of Bohemia; 1453 – 1457	Vacant Title next held by George
