= Emeric Zápolya =

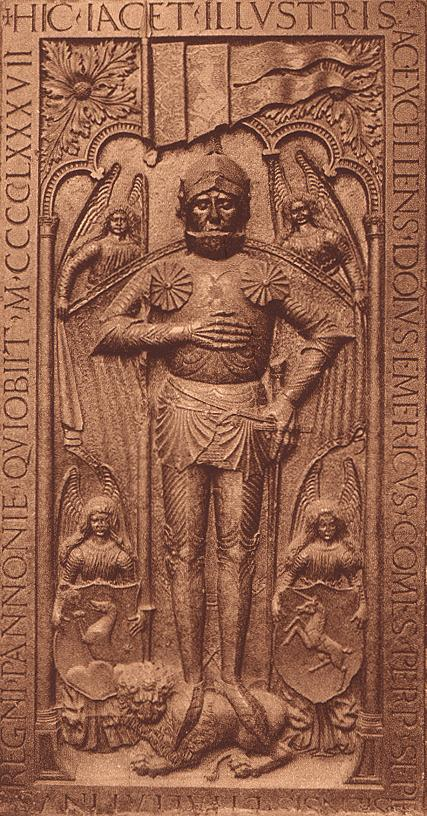
The armoured figure of Emeric Zápolya on his tombstone.

Emeric Zápolya or Imre Szapolyai (Hungarian: Szapolyai Imre; Croatian: Mirko Zapoljski died September 1487), was the Ban of Croatia, Dalmatia and Slavonia between 1464 and 1465 and Palatine of the Kingdom of Hungary between 1486 and 1487.

== Sources ==
- C. Tóth, Norbert; Horváth, Richárd; Neumann, Tibor; Pálosfalvi, Tamás (2016). Magyarország világi archontológiája, 1458–1526, I. Főpapok és bárók [Secular Archontology of Hungary, 1458–1526, Volume I: Prelates and Barons] (in Hungarian). MTA Bölcsészettudományi Kutatóközpont Történettudományi Intézete. ISBN 978-963-4160-35-9.
- Engel, Pál (2001). The Realm of St Stephen: A History of Medieval Hungary, 895–1526. I.B. Tauris Publishers. ISBN 1-86064-061-3.
- Markó, László (2006). A magyar állam főméltóságai Szent Istvántól napjainkig: Életrajzi Lexikon [Great Officers of State in Hungary from King Saint Stephen to Our Days: A Biographical Encyclopedia] (in Hungarian). Helikon Kiadó. ISBN 963-547-085-1.
- Kubinyi, András (2008). Matthias Rex. Balassi Kiadó. ISBN 978-963-506-767-1.
- Neumann, Tibor (2020). "Két nádor és egy vajda, avagy a Szapolyaiak útja a királyi trónig [Two Palatines and one Voivode: or, the Szapolyais' Road to the Hungarian Throne]". In Fodor, Pál; Varga, Szabolcs (eds.). Egy elfeledett magyar királyi dinasztia: A Szapolyaiak (in Hungarian). MTA Bölcsészettudományi Kutatóközpont. pp. 13–47. ISBN 978-963-416-220-9.
- Soós, Ferenc (1999). Magyarország kincstartói, 1340–1540 [The royal purse-bearers of Hungary, 1340–1540] (in Hungarian). Argumentum. ISBN 963-446-118-2.

Emeric House of Zápolya Born: ? Died: September 1487
Political offices
Preceded by Pavao Špirančić	Ban of Croatia; Slavonia and Dalmatia; 1464-1465	Succeeded by Ivan Thuz of Lak
Preceded by Michael Ország	Palatine of Hungary; 1486–1487	Vacant Title next held by Stephen Zápolya
