= Michael Ország =

Palatine of Hungary
- In office 1458–1484
- Monarch: Matthias I
- Preceded by: Ladislaus Garai
- Succeeded by: Emeric Zápolya

Personal details
- Born: c. 1410
- Died: 1484
- Spouse(s): (1) Barbara Rozgonyi (2) Anna Jakcs
- Parent(s): Caspar Ország (father); Catherine Parlagi (mother)

Michael Ország de Gút (Hungarian: gúti Ország Mihály) was Palatine of the Kingdom of Hungary between 1458 and 1484.

During Sigismund Reign he was Royal master of the Treasury.

== Sources ==
- Markó, László (2006). A magyar állam főméltóságai Szent Istvántól napjainkig: Életrajzi Lexikon [Great Officers of State in Hungary from King Saint Stephen to Our Days: A Biographical Encyclopedia] (in Hungarian). Helikon Kiadó. ISBN 963-547-085-1.
- Kubinyi, András (2008). Matthias Rex. Balassi Kiadó. ISBN 978-963-506-767-1.

Michael House of Ország de Gút Born: c. 1410 Died: 1484
Political offices
Preceded by John Rozgonyi	Royal treasurer 1436–1438	Succeeded by Ladislaus Szentgyörgyi
Preceded by Nicholas Perényi	Master of the stewards alongside Paul Bánfi; 1438–1439	Succeeded by Emeric Marcali
Preceded by Ladislaus Töttös	Royal treasurer 1440–1453	Succeeded by Nicholas Várdai
Preceded by John Pálóci	Master of the doorkeepers alongside Paul Bánfi; 1453–1458	Succeeded by Simon Cudar; Emeric Hédervári
Preceded by Ladislaus Garai	Palatine of Hungary; 1458–1484	Succeeded by Emeric Zápolya
