= Madalena do Mar =

- Civil parish
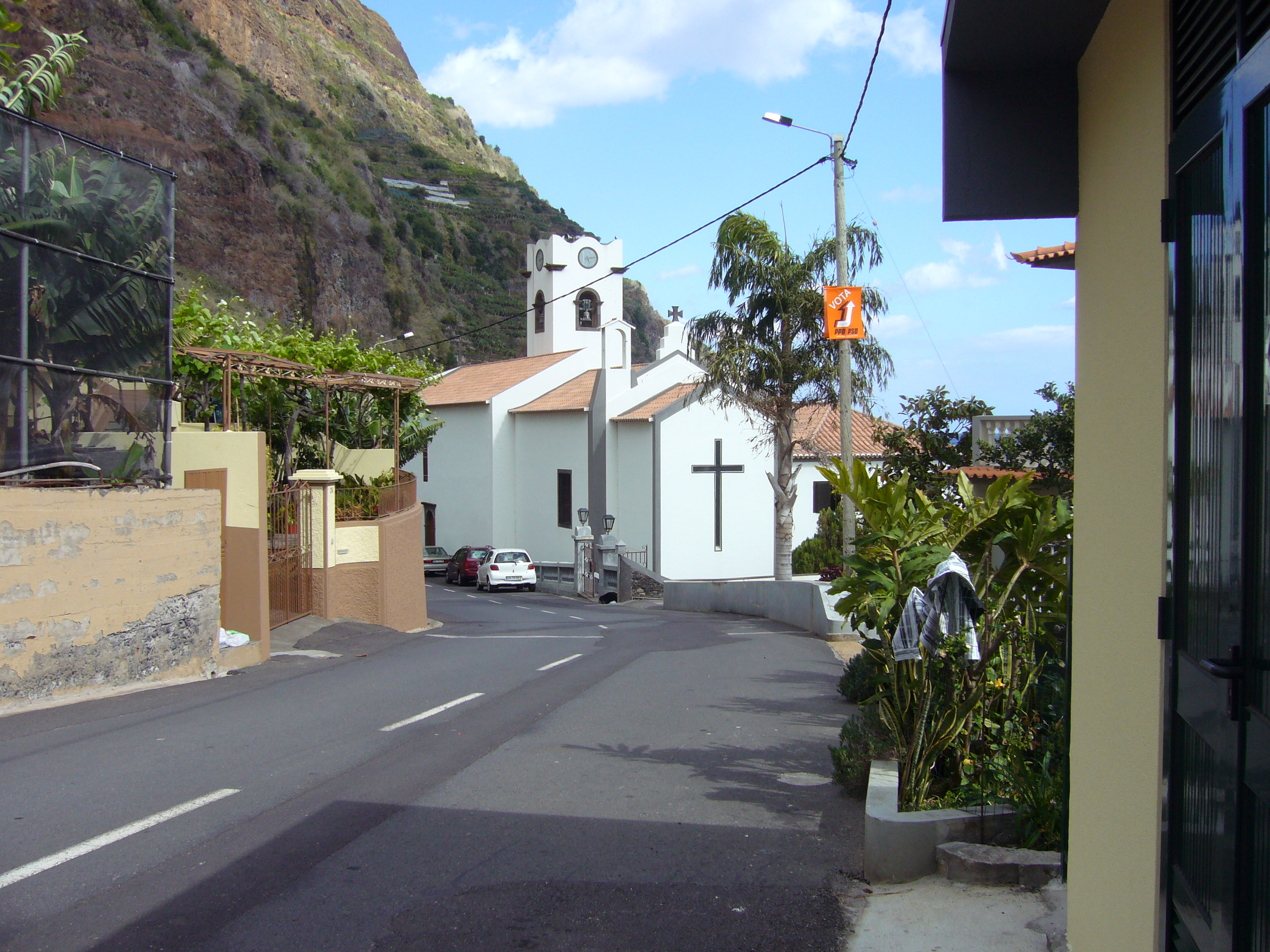
- The parish church of Madalena do Mar

- Location in Madeira
- Coordinates: 32°42′32″N 17°8′2″W
- Country: Portugal
- Auton. region: Madeira
- Island: Madeira
- Municipality: Ponta do Sol

Area
  - Total: 2.07 km^{2} (0.80 sq mi)
- Elevation: 141 m (463 ft)

Population (2011)
  - Total: 516
  - Density: 249/km^{2} (646/sq mi)
- Time zone: UTC+00:00 (WET)
  - Summer (DST): UTC+01:00 (WEST)
- Postal code: 9360-415
- Area code: 291
- Patron: Santa Maria Madalena
- Website: www.freguesiamadalenadomar.pt

Madalena do Mar is a civil parish in the municipality of Ponta do Sol in the Portuguese archipelago of Madeira. The population in 2011 was 516, in an area of 2.07 km^{2}.

== History ==
By conjecture, the primitive community was referred to as Madalena or Santa Maria Madalena, and received its suffix from its location along the sea, in order to distinguish it from the parish and chapel of Santa Maria Madalena, in the parish of Porto Moniz (which was the centre of pilgrimages). Even today, the area is still referred to as Madalena by many of the locals.

The parish had its origin in a small farm and houses, including chapel (whose patron was Santa Maria Madalena, but yet invoked to the name of Santa Catarina. From this origin, many noblemen concentrated into the area, as noted in Saudades da Terra by Gaspar Frutuoso:

"…Henrique Allemão, legendary person of the primitive times of colonization of this island of Madeira. Of him they said he was a Polish prince and that, having lost in 1444 a battle in Varna to Władysław III of Poland against Amurato II, he made a vow to travel the land as a knight onboard the carrack Santa Catarina do Monte Sinai. Arriving on the island of Madeira, João Gonçalo Zarco gave him the area that was later called Madalena do Mar, a large unseeded plot of land, which was later confirmed by Infante Henrique on 29 April 1457, and by Afonso V on the 18 May of the same year. With effect, Henrique Allemão there founded a large populated farm, with chapel to the invocation of Santa Maria Madalena, which resulted in the locality's name. He married the Lady Annes, and died disastrously when he was crushed when rocks falling from Cabo Girão fell on his boat, as he returned from the city of Funchal to Madalena. His wife later married João Rodrigues de Freitas. Still now there is, above the village of Ponta do Sol, a Fajã do Allemão, that the people corruptly cultivate lemon."

== Geography ==
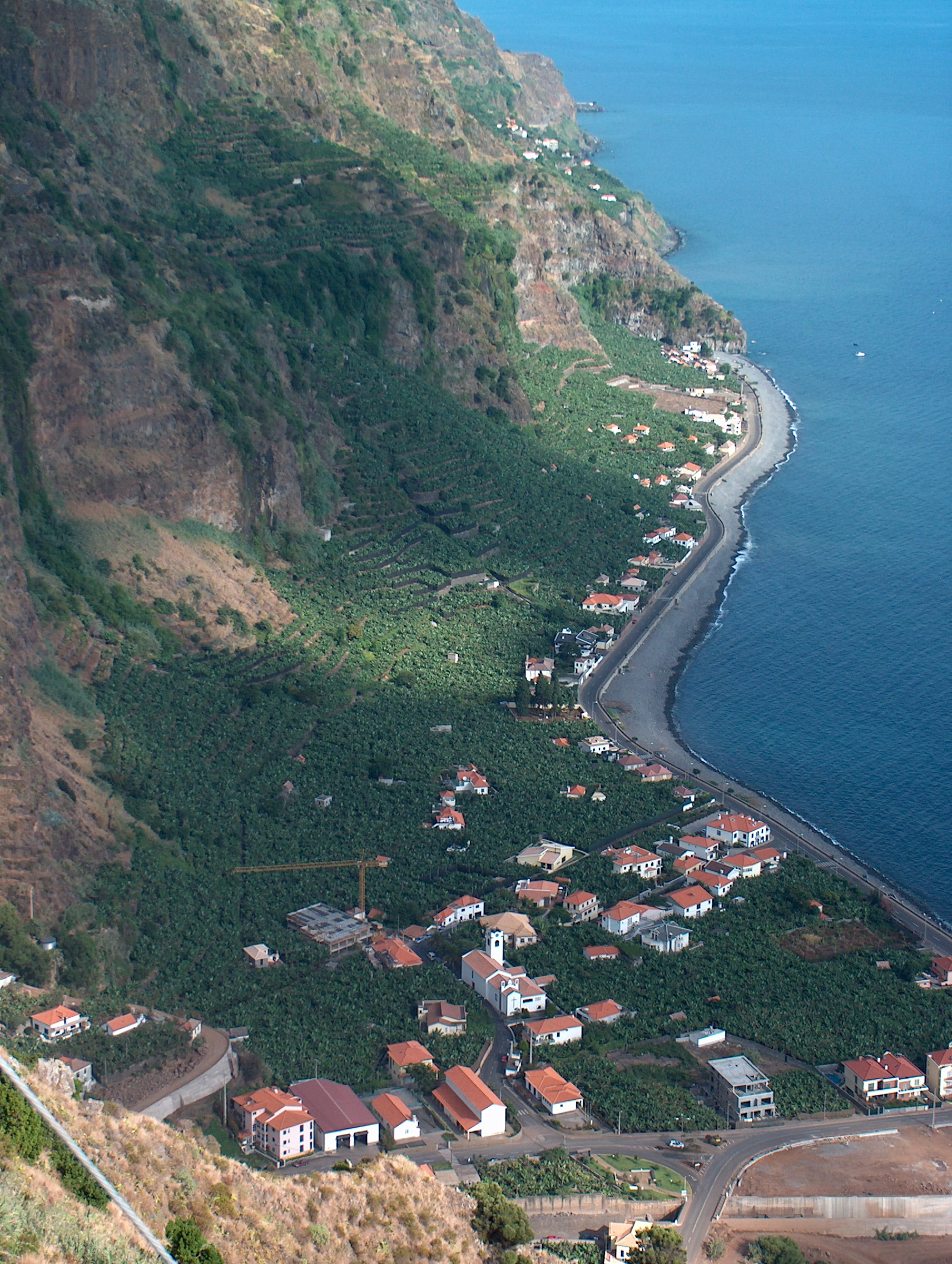
The coastal extent of Madalena do Mar: a strip of cultivated terrace-fields, with several buildings along the ravine and in the escarpment

This parish on the south-west coast of Madeira in the shadow of Canhas, and buttressed by the civil parish of Arco da Calheta, while fronting the Atlantic Ocean.

== Economy ==
The primary activity in the community is the cultivation of bananas, with much of the land along the cliff faces occupied by terraced fields with rows of banana plants.

Madalena do Mar is a parish with a primary school.
