= Arco da Calheta =

- Civil parish
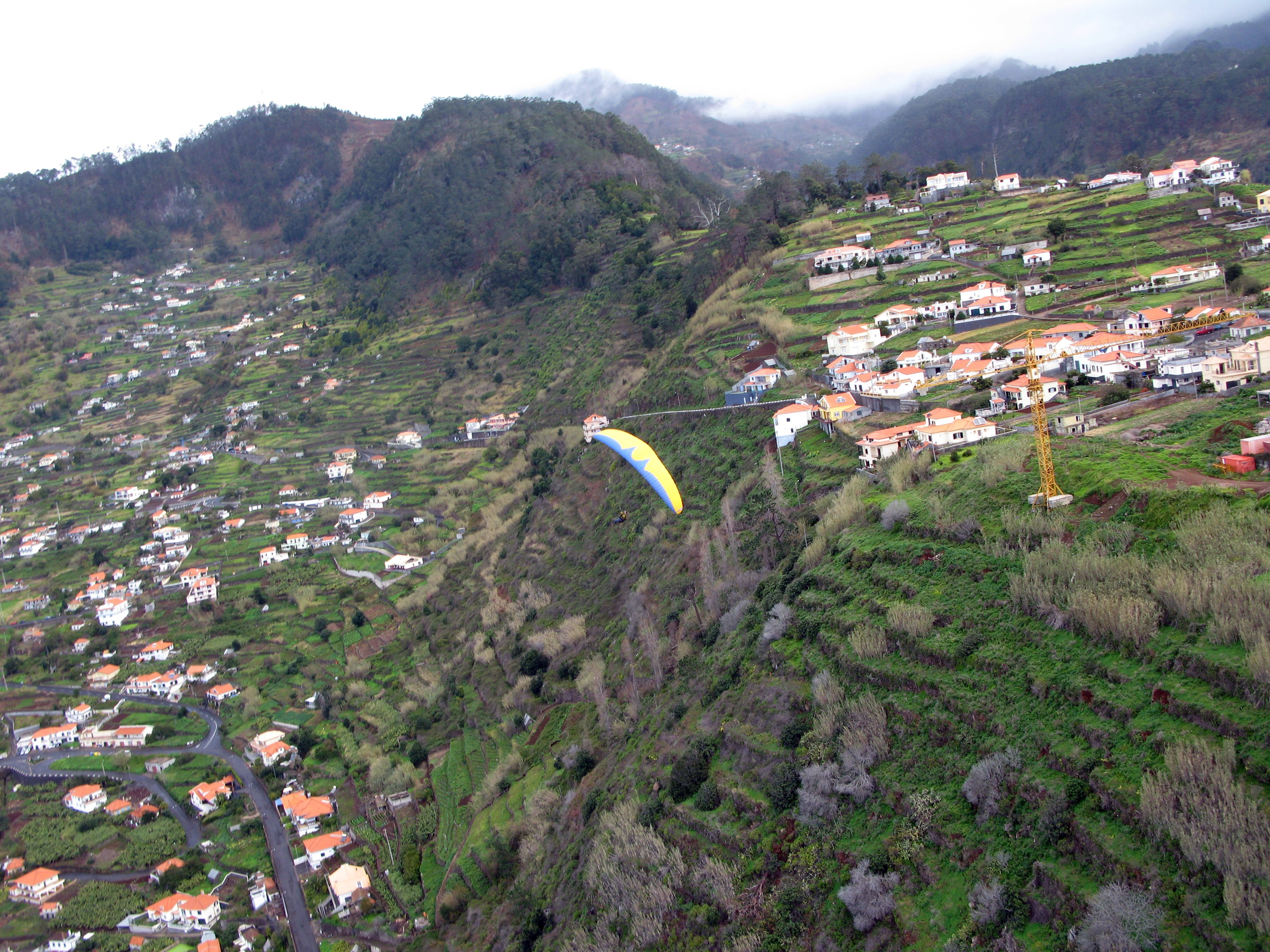
- A paraglider over the locality of Achada de Santo Antão

- Location in Madeira
- Coordinates: 32°44′4″N 17°8′4″W
- Country: Portugal
- Auton. region: Madeira
- Island: Madeira
- Municipality: Calheta
- Established: Settlement: fl. 1500; Parish: c. 1572

Area
  - Total: 14.70 km^{2} (5.68 sq mi)

Population (2011)
  - Total: 3,168
  - Density: 215.5/km^{2} (558.2/sq mi)
- Time zone: UTC+00:00 (WET)
  - Summer (DST): UTC+01:00 (WEST)
- Postal code: 9370-024
- Area code: 291

Arco da Calheta is a civil parish in the municipality of Calheta in the Portuguese island of Madeira. The population in 2011 was 3,168, in an area of 14.70 km². Arco da Calheta is the largest parish in Calheta in population.

== Geography ==
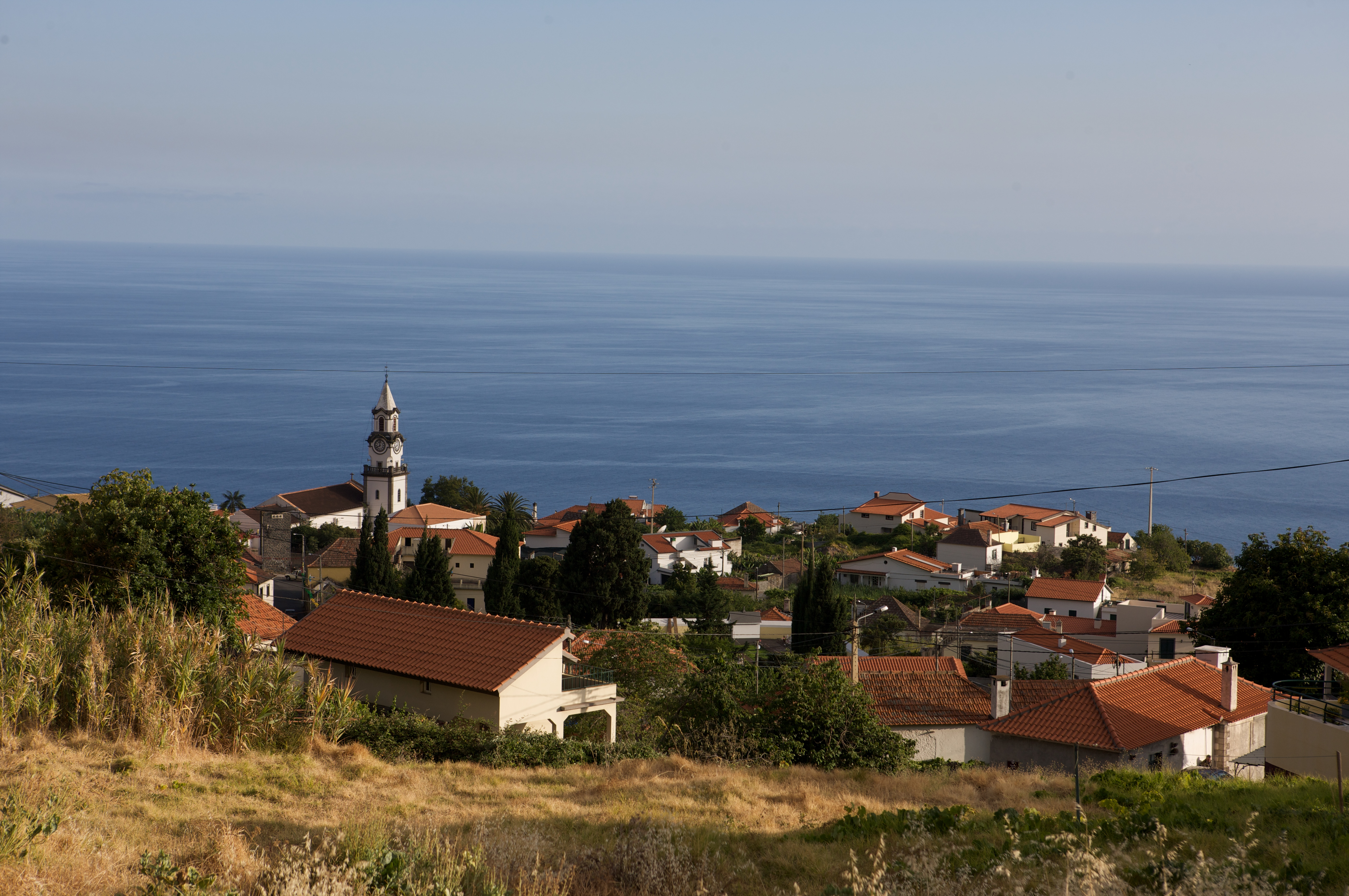
The suburban residential homes near the main square in Arco da Calheta, overlooking the Atlantic Ocean

The parish of Arco da Calheta is surrounded to the north and west by the parish of Calheta, and east by the municipality of Ponta do Sol (specifically the parishes of Canhas and Madalena do Mar), fronting the Atlantic Ocean along its southern border. Buildings are found in the amphitheatre-shaped valley, as well as on the escarpments overlooking the community, alongside Calheta (in Calhau Grande) and Madalena do Mar (Achada de Santo Antão). Its landscape within this semi-circular valley was the basis for its name; the early settlers, owing to the band/arch of settlements with the valley, baptized the region the "Arch of Calheta", or Arco da Calheta. A band of laurisilva forests subdivides the parishes built-up area from the barren vegetation of the mountains.
