= Cascata dos Anjos =

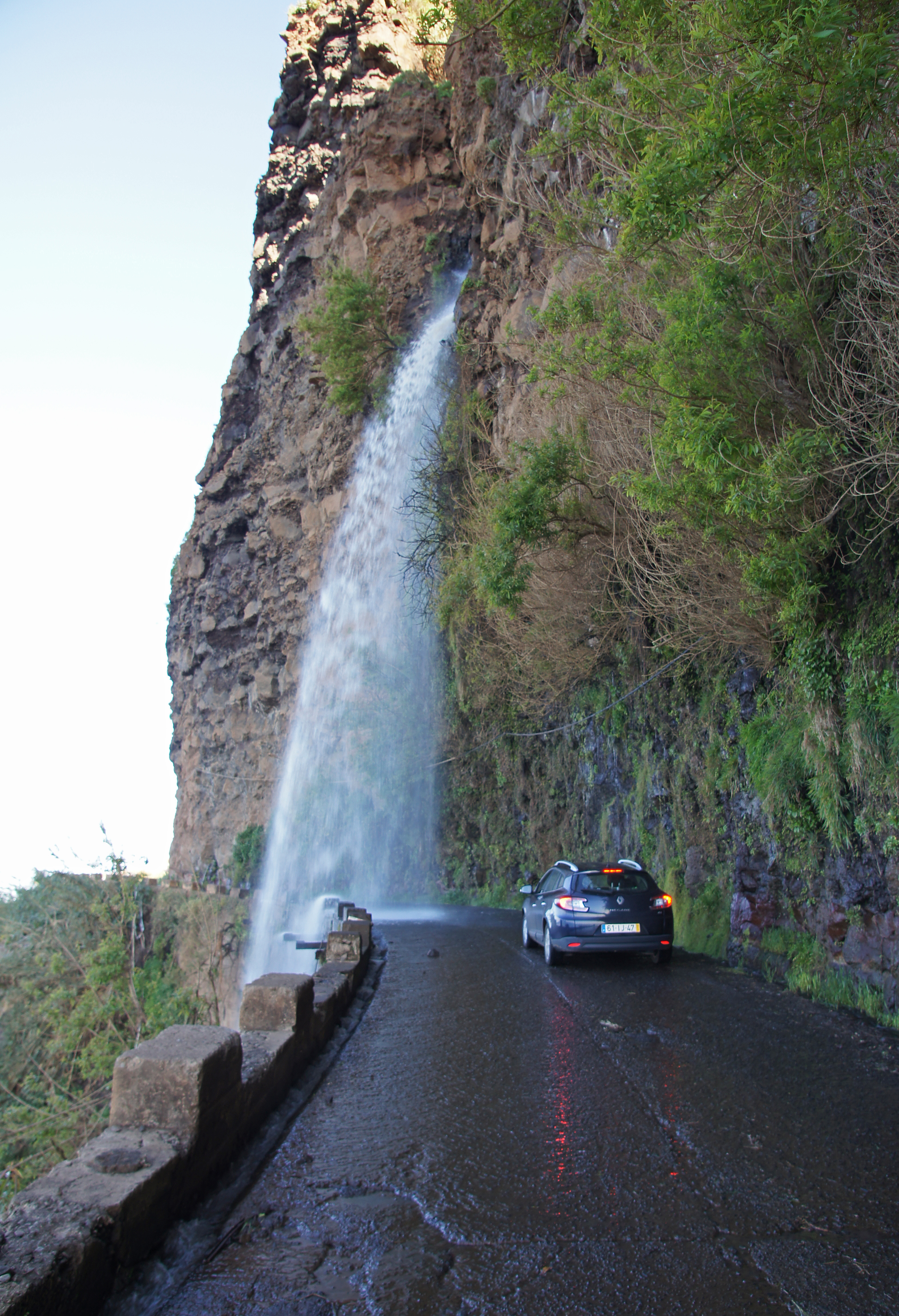
- Cascata dos Anjos on Madeira, Portugal

- Location within Madeira
- Location: Anjos, Ponta do Sol, Madeira, Portugal
- Coordinates: 32.6867°N 17.1138°W

The Cascata dos Anjos (Angels Waterfall) is a waterfall located in the civil parish of Anjos, municipality of Ponta do Sol, on the Portuguese island of Madeira.

The waterfall cascades over the rockface onto the old E.R.101 regional roadway, and spills into the sea below.

== See also ==
- List of waterfalls
