= Władysław III of Poland =

Monarch of Poland-Lithuania (1434–1444); King of Hungary and Croatia (1440–1444)

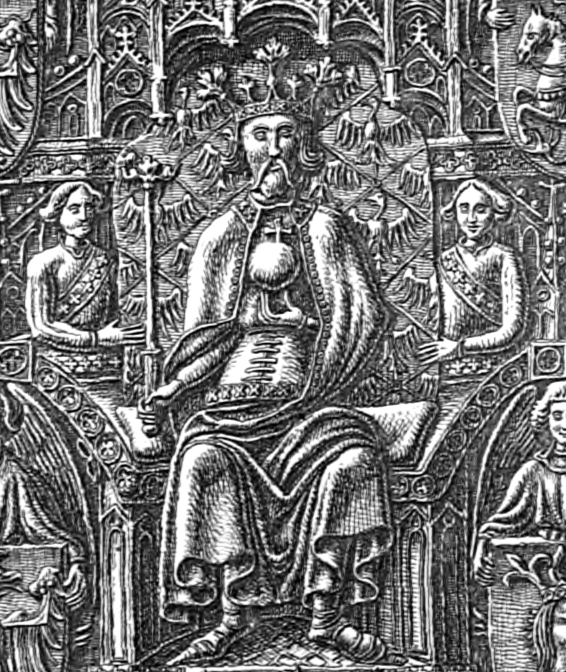
- Detail of Władysław III's seal

King of Poland
- Reign: 25 July 1434 – 10 November 1444
- Coronation: 25 July 1434, Wawel Cathedral
- Predecessor: Władysław II Jagiełło
- Successor: Interregnum (1444 – 1447); Casimir IV Jagiellon (1447)
- Regent: Zbigniew Oleśnicki (1434–1438)

Supreme Duke of Lithuania
- Reign: 1 June 1434 – 10 November 1444
- Predecessor: Władysław Jagiełło and Sigismund Kęstutaitis (Grand Duke)
- Successor: Casimir
- Co-rulers (Grand Dukes): Sigismund Kęstutaitis (1434 – 1440); Casimir (1440 – 1444)

King of Hungary and Croatia
- Reign: 1440 – 1444
- Coronation: 17 July 1440, Székesfehérvár Basilica
- Predecessor: Albert II of Germany
- Successor: Ladislaus the Posthumous
- Born: 31 October 1424; Kraków, Kingdom of Poland
- Died: 10 November 1444 (aged 20) (presumed); Varna, Ottoman Empire (present-day Bulgaria)
- Dynasty: Jagiellon
- Father: Władysław II Jagiełło
- Mother: Sophia of Halshany
- Religion: Roman Catholic

Władysław III of Poland (Note: Also known in English as Vladislaus, Wladislaus, Wladislas, Ladislaus or Ladislas. Hungarian: I. Ulászló; Slovak: Vladislav I; Czech: Vladislav Varnenčík; Bulgarian: Владислав Варненчик (Vladislav Varnenchik); Lithuanian: Vladislovas III Varnietis; Croatian: Vladislav I. Jagelović.) (31 October 1424 – presumably 10 November 1444), also known as Ladislaus of Varna, was King of Poland and Supreme Duke (Note: He inherited the title of the Supreme Duke (Supremus Dux) of Grand Duchy of Lithuania as the eldest son of Władysław II Jagiełło, who adopted this title after the Union of Horodło in 1413.) of the Grand Duchy of Lithuania from 1434, as well as King of Hungary and Croatia as Vladislaus I from 1440 until his presumed death at the Battle of Varna. He was the eldest son of Władysław II Jagiełło (Jogaila) by his fourth wife, Lithuanian noblewoman Sophia of Halshany.

Władysław III succeeded his father shortly before turning ten in 1434 and was, therefore, deemed unfit to rule until coming of age. Cardinal Zbigniew Oleśnicki acted as regent and a temporary provisores council executed power in the king's name. However, Władysław III's legitimacy to the crown was contested by Lesser Polish nobles favouring the candidacy of Siemowit V of Masovia, who was of Piast lineage. In the aftermath of the coronation, Spytko III of Melsztyn accused Oleśnicki, the council and the Catholic Church of exploiting the king's youth to hold authority. A sympathiser with the Czech Hussites, Spytko was killed at the Battle of Grotniki in 1439, thus ending the hostilities.

Władysław III simultaneously faced the effects of the Polish–Teutonic War, which commenced under his father's reign in 1431. The Teutonic Knights began supporting Švitrigaila and the Livonian Order in a military struggle against Poland and Sigismund Kęstutaitis of Lithuania in 1434, shortly after Władysław III assumed the throne. Consequently, the king and the Polish Royal Council, the curia regis, renewed their war efforts by fortifying the borderland regions and sending an army to Lithuania, which was engulfed in a civil war since 1432. Švitrigaila, the Livonians and their allies were ultimately defeated at the Battle of Wiłkomierz, and Władysław forced the Peace of Brześć Kujawski on the Teutonic State in December 1435, which curtailed Teutonic influence in East-Central Europe.

The policy of the Kingdom of Poland under Władysław and Oleśnicki was to reclaim lost territories such as Silesia or Pomerania and expand its influence to neighbouring realms. In 1440, Władysław was elected King of Hungary and Croatia following the death of Albert II of Germany. Albert's widow, Elizabeth of Luxembourg, spurned the outcome and advocated for her infant son, Ladislaus the Posthumous, to rule under the guardianship of Frederick III Habsburg whilst purloining the Holy Crown of Hungary. Prolonged hostilities from the Habsburgs, the imminent Ottoman advance into Hungary and Elizabeth's sudden death solidified Władysław's legitimacy to the Hungarian throne. Ruling much of Southeastern and Central Europe, Władysław became compelled in confronting the Ottoman Empire.

With the Turkish grip over the Balkans weakened in the aftermath of the Hungarian–Ottoman War (1437–1442), the papacy and papal legate Julian Cesarini urged Władysław to launch the Crusade of Varna. After initial successes, the outnumbered Christian forces engaged in a decisive battle at Varna, where Władysław was reportedly killed in a heroic cavalry charge against Sultan Murad II. His body was never recovered and its disappearance led to numerous survival theories or legends, none of which have been confirmed. Władysław's legacy in Poland and Hungary is divisive, yet Władysław remains a notable figure in countries like Bulgaria, which were under Ottoman domination. He was succeeded in Poland by his younger brother Casimir IV, and in Hungary-Croatia by his rival Ladislaus V the Posthumous.

== Early life, 1424–1434 ==
=== Childhood, 1424–1431 ===
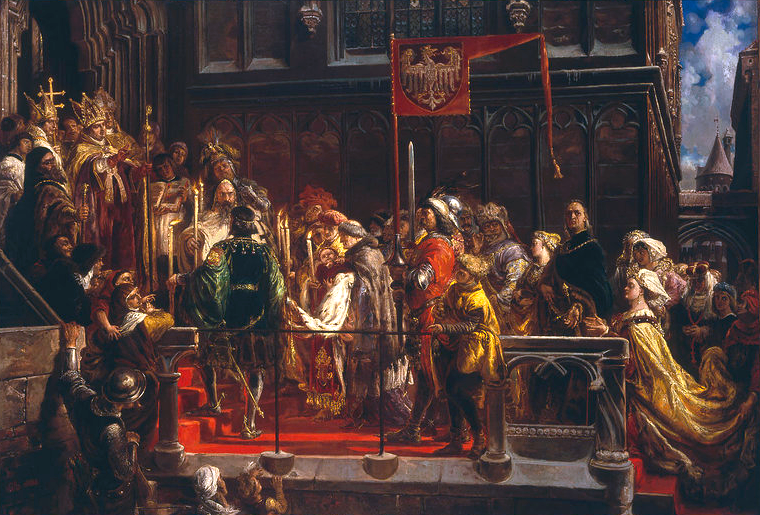
Baptism of Władysław III (1425) at Wawel Cathedral in Kraków as imagined by Jan Matejko.

Władysław III was born in Kraków on 31 October 1424, the first-born son of Władysław II Jagiełło (his pagan name was Jogaila) and Sophia of Halshany, both of whom were Lithuanian in origin. His father was already an elderly man, having outlived his first three wives, and the birth of a male successor was widely regarded as a miracle. Based on two possible dates for Władysław's conception, it appears his birth was either premature or postterm.

He was baptised at Wawel Cathedral in mid-February 1425 by Wojciech Jastrzębiec, Bishop of Gniezno and Primate of Poland. It took place in the presence of Andrzej Łaskarz Laskary, Bishop of Poznań and Zbigniew Oleśnicki, Bishop of Kraków as well as statesmen and royal emissaries from the surrounding realms. The ceremony was unequivocally grandiose; the most probable day of the baptism is 18 February, though this continues to be contested by historians and various sources.

In 1427, the Polish nobility initiated anti-Jagiellonian opposition and attempted to have Jogaila's sons declared illegitimate to the Polish throne as they possessed no blood relation to their Piast and Anjou predecessors. In the same year, Queen Sophia was accused of adultery, which aggravated the conflict. Despite the agreements signed between Jogaila and the magnates to ensure the succession for his sons, the opposing faction opted for Hedwig Jagiellon, Jogaila's daughter by his second wife, and her betrothed Frederick II of Brandenburg. However, the conspiracy was resolved by the death of the princess in December 1431, rumoured to have been poisoned by Sophia.

=== Opposition and Cardinal Oleśnicki, 1432–1434 ===
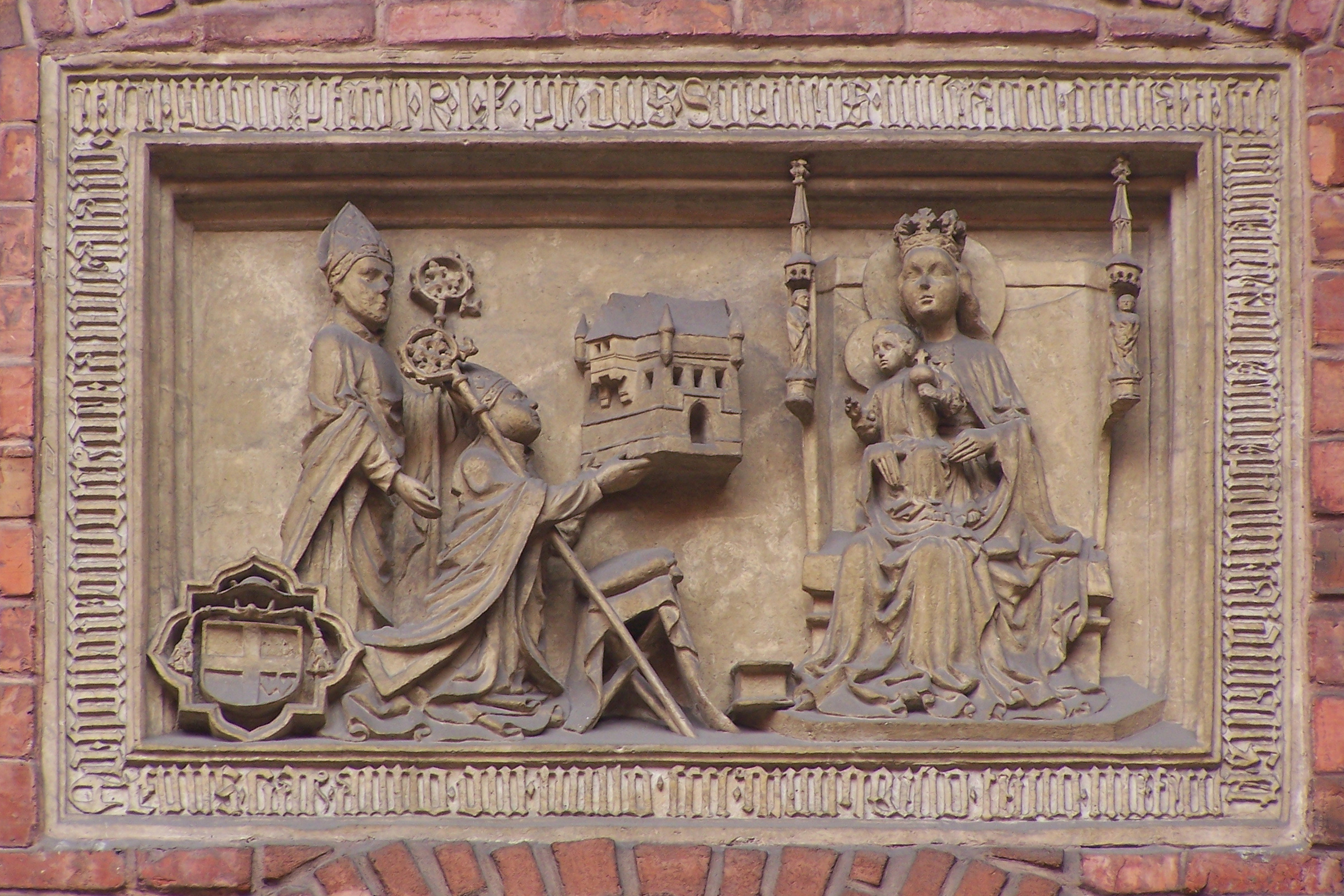
Zbigniew Oleśnicki, seen kneeling to the left, was instrumental in securing Władysław's right to the throne.

From a young age, Władysław III was surrounded by advisors loyal to Zbigniew Oleśnicki (known in Latin as Sbigneus), a cardinal who acted as royal guardian and aimed at maintaining his influence and high position at court. Oleśnicki learned of Jogaila's death on 1 June 1434 in Poznań, whilst he was en route to the Council of Basel, but decided to remain in Poland and usurp the role of interrex. He subsequently convened an assembly in Poznań with the assistance of Chancellor Jan Taszka Koniecpolski, and called for the nobles of Greater Poland to warrant Władysław's right to the crown. This arbitrary behaviour displayed by the assembly vexed the nobility of Lesser Poland, who were outmanoeuvred and excluded from the vote.

There was growing antagonism in the demesne and the challengers feared that crowning a young and inexperienced king would invest Oleśnicki with too much power over the affairs of state. Others repudiated a son of formerly-pagan Jogaila on the Polish throne and yearned for a living descendant of the Piast dynasty. The candidacy of Siemowit V remained a considerable threat to Władysław III, especially since Siemowit was of royal Piast lineage and a member of a branch that ruled the Duchy of Masovia since the testament of Bolesław III Wrymouth in the 12th century.

Many opponents also attempted to counter the power of the Catholic clergy, notably under the influence of Hussitism from neighbouring Bohemia. Among the chief adversaries were Abraham Zbąski, the judge royal of Poznań and a fierce propagator of the Hussites' proto-Protestant movement, Dziersław Rytwiański, and Spytko III of Melsztyn, a supporter of pro-Hussite military expeditions led by Sigismund Korybut to Bohemia in the years 1422–1427. They received clandestine sponsorship from influential magnates and nobles from Lesser Poland, who persuaded Oleśnicki to delay the coronation until 25 July 1434. This granted the opposition additional time to establish an independent assembly on 13 July in Opatów, where forthcoming actions were to be discussed. Oleśnicki, having discovered their intent, arrived to the proceedings unannounced and successfully questioned its purpose, and the council hastily dissolved. Negotiations were held in Kraków prior to 25 July with the dignitaries sent by Sigismund Kęstutaitis and Spytko, who attempted to obstruct Władysław's accession. Jan Głowacz Oleśnicki, Crown Marshal of Poland and the brother of Zbigniew Oleśnicki, called for a decisive vote, which ended the dispute.

== Reign, 1434–1444 ==
=== Coronation, 1434 ===
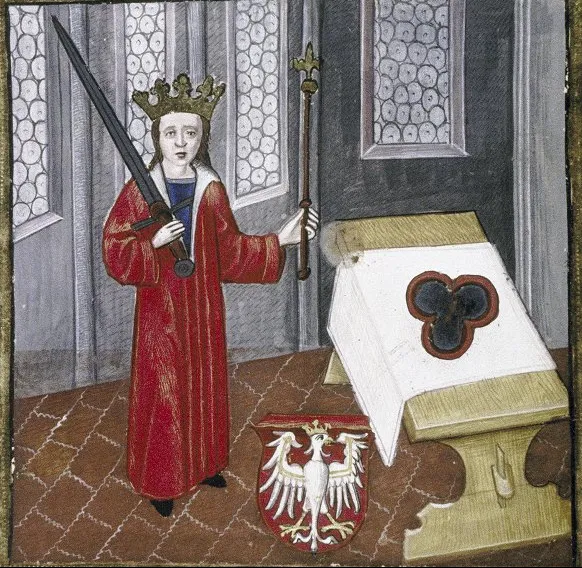
Young Władysław III depicted in a 15th century prayerbook. The Polish White Eagle can be seen in the shield.

Władysław III was crowned at Wawel Cathedral on 25 July 1434 by the elderly Wojciech Jastrzębiec. (Note: Teresa Pac incorrectly provides the date as 25 August 1434 in her work Common Culture and the Ideology of Difference in Medieval and Contemporary Poland.) There is evidence that the coronation was closely supervised by Oleśnicki, who was instrumental in determining how the investiture is conducted. Changes were made to the order of formalities under Oleśnicki's Ordo ad cornandum ad regem Poloniae, notably the young monarch was obliged to take an oath before the anointment and the handing over of Polish royal insignia. This act was to be seen as submission to the privileges of nobles; the king-elect's fulfillment of the elites' requirements, not hereditary rights, was a condition for obtaining the throne in the Kingdom of Poland. Furthermore, the crown jewels were given to the officials, rather than being placed at the altar, implying Władysław III's minority and the officials' active participation in the coronation. The act in which Władysław III undertook signum crucis with a sword in the direction of the four corners of the world was abandoned.

The chronicler Jan Długosz (Latin: Johannes Longinus) writes that the boy king, dressed in royal garments and accompanied by bishops Oleśnicki and Stanisław z Pawłowic, Bishop of Płock, rode from Wawel Castle to greet the townsfolk. However, a customary feudal homage by the burghers at Kraków Town Hall came into effect because of a disagreement between the bishops and Masovia princes concerning the order of precedence in the royal procession and on sitting arrangements.

=== Regency, 1434–1438 ===
Shortly after the coronation, senior nobles held both covert and open conventions to discuss the possibility of instituting a regency as the king was still a minor and could not govern. Duke Siemowit, who was staying in the capital of Kraków at the time, remained a valid contender for the role of regent or caretaker because of his personal qualities and rank; however, the idea was soon dismissed. Many of the noble lords believed that Siemowit could seize the crown for himself, rather than remain an inferior subject to the boy. Queen Sophia's attempts to be named regent, in accordance with her late husband's instructions, also failed and the general indecisiveness caused the apex of oligarch influence in medieval Poland. As compromise, a regency council was formed comprising regional governors called the provisores. Długosz noted three members, each selected for merit and "wisdom", (Note: The Polish term "rozum", embedded in the chronicles of Jan Długosz, is directly translated as "the mind" and can be interpreted as "wisdom".) which was possibly aimed at curtailing Zbigniew Oleśnicki's influence. Nonetheless, Oleśnicki retained considerable control over Władysław's upbringing.

It is believed that Władysław did not have a decisive voice in politics and the situation did not change even after the Sejm, the Polish Parliament, had gathered in Piotrków in 1438 and declared the 14-year-old king to have attained his majority.

=== Civil war in Lithuania, 1434–1438 ===
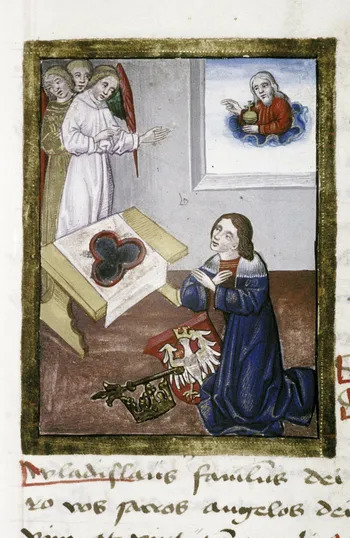
Władysław III portrayed in a prayerbook held at the Bodleian Library in Oxford, 15th century.

Following Jagiełło's death, Władysław was recognized in Lithuania by Grand Duke Sigismund Kęstutaitis as his dominant co-ruler and the Supreme Duke. Nevertheless, the young monarch faced certain challenges early in his reign; in particular, the inherited situation in the Grand Duchy of Lithuania was precarious and the ensuing Lithuanian Civil War (1432–1438) threatened Polish interests there. The conflict began already during Jagiełło's reign, when Władysław's paternal uncle, Švitrigaila, refused to acknowledge fealty to his brother Jogaila and proclaimed political independence, jeopardising the Polish–Lithuanian union. He subsequently battled against Polish–Lithuanian forces in Volhynia and established an anti-Polish coalition. In June 1431, he reached an agreement with the Teutonic State, which declared a surprise war and marched its army into Polish territory. Following a truce with the Teutonic Knights, the war resumed when Władysław became king. The situation swiftly transformed into a diplomatic struggle for Władysław and the Poles, who sought to turn Lithuanian nobles against Švitrigaila and have him ousted.

A Polish retinue of approximately 4,000 men under Jakub Kobylański assisted the Lithuanians headed by Sigismund Kęstutaitis and Michael Žygimantaitis; their joint army defeated Švitrigaila and his allies, Sigismund Korybut and the Livonian Order, on 1 September 1435 at the Battle of Wiłkomierz. Švitrigaila fled eastward, but eventually lost the support of the Ruthenians residing in the Grand Duchy and went into exile to Moldavia in 1438, thus ending civil war. However, unrest re-emerged when Sigismund Kęstutaitis was assassinated on 20 March 1440 and Władysław III's younger brother, Casimir IV Jagiellon, was proclaimed Grand Duke by Jonas Goštautas and the Lithuanian Council of Lords on 29 June 1440. This was met with hostility at the Polish court, especially since Casimir was underage and the Poles hoped for a vicegerent that would submit to Poland. Regardless of the outcome, Władysław continued to use the title of Supreme Duke of Lithuania until death under the conditions of the 1413 Union of Horodło.

The battle also proved momentous in combating the Livonian Order as its Grand Master, Franco Kerskorff, and komtur commanders were killed or taken prisoner. The Livonian Confederation agreement from 4 December 1435 officially terminated its crusading character, and a formal peace treaty was signed on 31 December 1435 in Brześć Kujawski whereby the Teutonic and Livonian Orders pledged not to intrude or disturb the internal affairs of both Poland and Lithuania. That act concluded the Polish–Teutonic War (1431–1435). Moreover, any association between the knights and the Pope or the Holy Roman Emperor would violate the treaty. His youth prevented Władysław from engaging directly in the peace talks, and the negotiations were predominantly undertaken by diplomats or the clergy.

=== Domestic and foreign policy, 1438–1440 ===
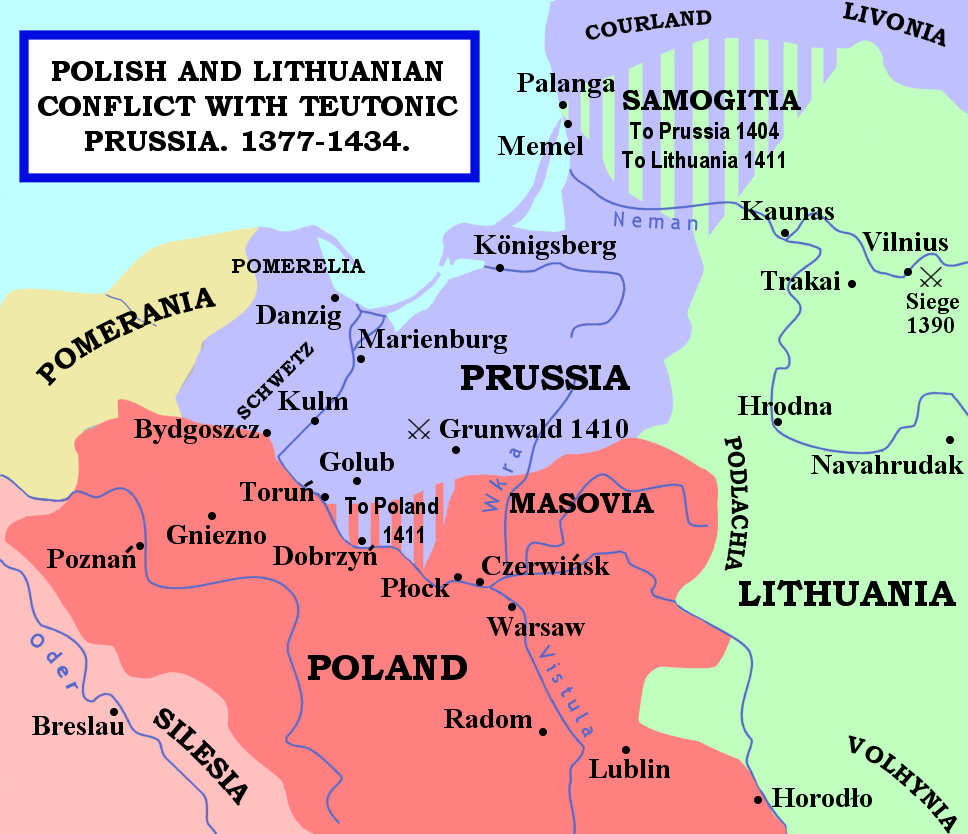
A map illustrating the borders of Poland, Lithuania and Prussia, and the regions of Silesia and Pomerania.

The successive years were marked by the extirpation of Polish Hussites under the Edict of Wieluń, signed earlier in 1424. The initial hostilities eventually culminated in a minor rebellion during Władysław's reign. On 3 May 1439, Spytko III of Melsztyn formed a small but armed ad hoc confederation in the town of Nowy Korczyn against Oleśnicki's desire to exterminate the Hussites and to challenge his authority over the young king. Consequently, Spytko was accused of high treason and maleficence. The cardinal sent crown troops to pacify the movement and execute the death warrant. Spytko was ultimately killed at the Battle of Grotniki. His corpse, pierced with arrows, lay bare in the field for three days; however, Władysław III personally ordered Spytko III's body to be returned to his widow and restored the family's noble status and privileges.

The court also devised the return of lost territories, most notably the southern Duchies of Silesia, which continued to be ruled by the Silesian Piasts. In the north, the gentry of Greater Poland and Kuyavia demanded the recovery of Pomerania. Speaking on behalf of Władysław, the cardinal was opposed to the idea of reclaiming Pomerania and believed that peace between Poland and the Teutonic Order was critical, as the Teutonic Knights were no longer a tool of the Holy Roman Emperor and were wary of taking up arms. He also dedicated himself to subtler diplomatic measures when addressing the issue of Silesia, a large historical region within the Bohemian Crown, but was unwilling to support the Hussites militarily against Sigismund of Luxembourg and his son-in-law, Albert II of Germany. The priority was diverted towards stabilising domestic affairs as well as maintaining Poland's status as a great power and a pillar of the Catholic Church in East-Central Europe.

The union with Lithuania remained impregnable, and a dynastic union with the Kingdom of Hungary was to be formed, as Sigismund had no male heirs. The Polish Sejm and statesmen (Note: Oleśnicki often spoke in the name of political leaders in the country.) hoped that by marrying Władysław to one of Sigismund's granddaughters, Poland could secure his accession in Hungary and foist Jagiellonian rule there. That would restore a union of Hungary and Poland, which had not been seen since the reign of Louis I of Anjou (1370–1382). The union would also allow Poland to renegotiate disputed territories between the Poles and the Hungarians, including Halych (later constituting Galicia) and Moldavia. In response, Poland would propose a military alliance and vow the expulsion of the Ottoman Turks from Hungarian lands.

=== King of Hungary and Croatia, 1440 ===
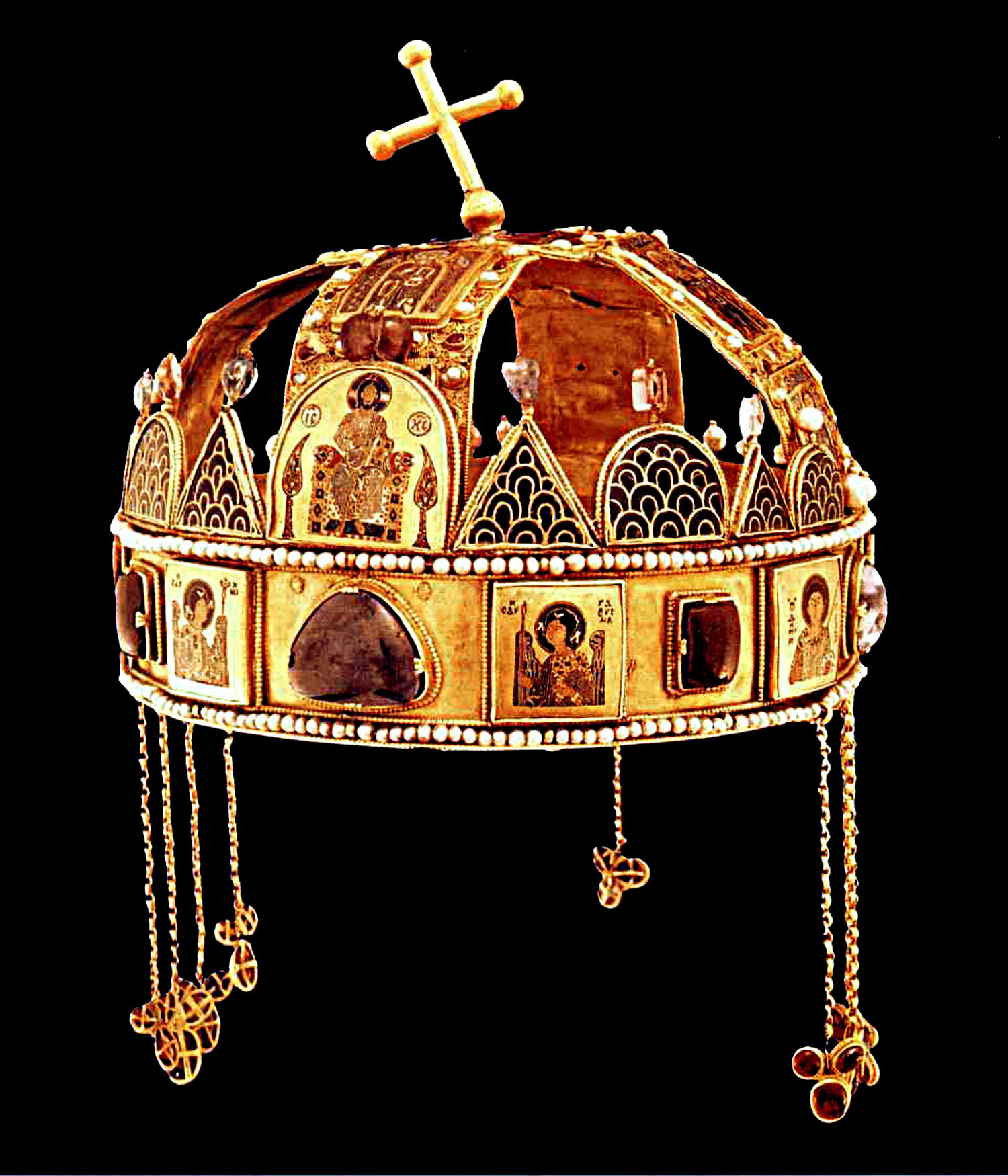
The Holy Crown of Hungary was hidden from Władysław by Elizabeth of Luxembourg to prevent his coronation as King of Hungary.

In October 1439, Albert II died and left the Austrian, Bohemian and Hungarian thrones unoccupied. His only son, born in February 1440, became known as Ladislaus the Posthumous. Ladislaus' claim to the Duchy of Austria was acknowledged in accordance with Albert's testament. Under the influence and pressure of Oldřich II of Rosenberg, the Catholic nobles were also inclined to endorse Ladislaus's hereditary right to Bohemia. Conversely, the Hungarians were not willing to pass his candidacy and began dialogue with the Poles. In early January 1440, the Hungarian Estates rejected the deceased king's testament at an assembly in Buda that would place the regency in the hands of Frederick III Habsburg.

The general animosity towards the Habsburg dynasty and the impending Ottoman threat prevented the Hungarians from accepting an infant as king and turned to Poland. Ladislaus' widowed mother, Queen Elizabeth of Luxembourg, was desperate to halt that and sent intermediaries to persuade the Hungarians to terminate all negotiations with Władysław. Contrary to her efforts, the Hungarian nobles proved resolute and elected Władysław king on 8 March 1440. Prior to his election, Władysław III vowed to marry Elizabeth and protect her infant son's interests in Austria and Bohemia. Simultaneously, Władysław III was made King of Croatia as the Croatian dominion was in a personal union with Hungary since 1102.

Elizabeth did not approve of the Estates' election, and on 15 May 1440, she had her son crowned with the Holy Crown of Hungary, which one of Elizabeth's ladies-in-waiting (Helene Kottanner) had stolen from safekeeping at the fortress of Visegrád. The Hungarians soon decried the ceremony as an unlawful farce and utilised a reliquary crown for Władysław III's coronation on 17 July 1440 at the Basilica of the Assumption of the Blessed Virgin Mary in Székesfehérvár. He had also received significant support from Pope Eugene IV, in exchange for his help in organising an anti-Muslim crusade. Although still young and king solely by title, Władysław III became deeply involved in the struggle against the Ottomans, having been brought up in the standard of a pious Christian monarch.

=== Discord and unrest, 1440–1442 ===
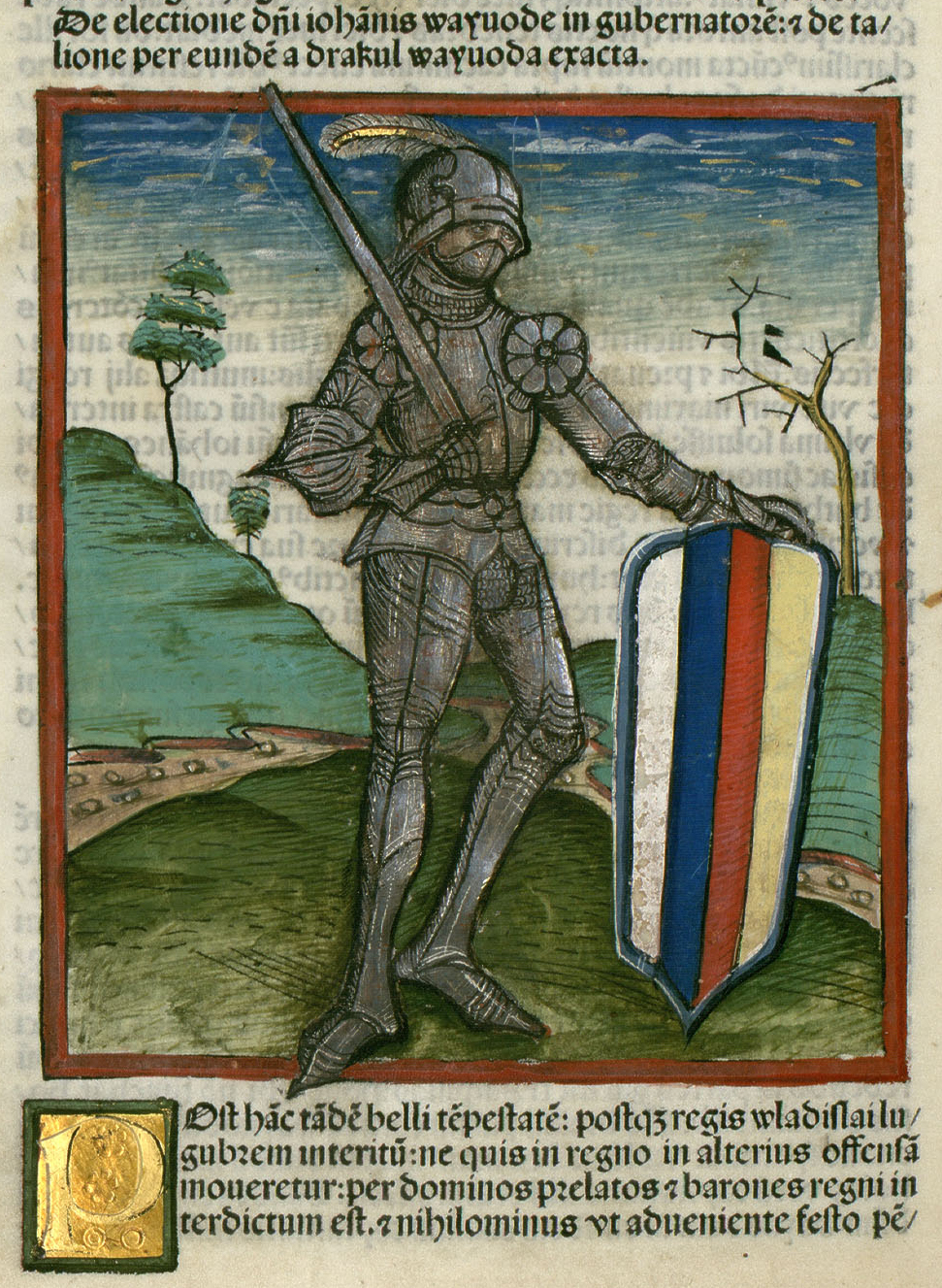
John Hunyadi, who supported Władysław's claim to the Hungarian throne and aided him militarily. Depiction from the Chronica Hungarorum, 1488.

Shortly after Władysław's accession, the conflict with the supporters of Elizabeth deepened. The western and northern parts of the country remained on the side of the queen and opposing magnates, chiefly the Counts of Celje (Cilli), the Garai family and Dénes Szécsi, Archbishop of Esztergom. In turn, the eastern regions and Transylvania upheld Władysław III and his partisans, among them John Hunyadi, who became a leading political and military figure in Hungary.

In order to assert her claim, Elizabeth had to maintain the wealthy mining counties in what now constitutes Slovakia and hired Hussite mercenaries from Bohemia commanded by John Jiskra. Jiskra undertook a quick campaign and occupied many of the fortresses and defensive posts in northern Hungary, often with the support of local populations and devotees that held Jiskra in high regard because of his fight for religious freedoms. As a benefactor to the mercenaries, Elizabeth had to pawn the Holy Crown and transfer tutelage over her newborn son to Frederick III. However, this proved insufficient to fund the war against Władysław; she was then forced to hand over her privately owned Austrian estates and the Hungarian County of Sopron to the Habsburgs in late 1440 and early 1441. This conduct alienated many of the lords that initially supported Elizabeth's cause, including Nicholas of Ilok, Ban of Croatia, who switched sides and allied himself with Władysław III and John Hunyadi.

The western territories, as well as some 70 fortresses under Ulrich II, Count of Celje in modern-day Austria, Croatia and Slovenia, remained stalwart and loyal to the queen. Before the end of 1440, Hunyadi attacked Győr but was unable to take the garrisoned city. He was, however, successful in capturing local townships and villages around Buda and Székesfehérvár to prevent the escape of nobles and designated traitors. This proved paramount when Ulrich II made an attempt to flee to Bratislava (Pozsony); he was caught by a Polish detachment and subsequently imprisoned at Władysław III's behest. Concurrently, Ladislaus Garai instigated a rebellion in the south. Hunyadi, together with Nicholas of Ilok, annihilated Garai's army at Bátaszék on 10 September 1440. In January 1441, Ulrich was released from captivity, pledged an oath of loyalty to Władysław and freed the hostages held by his troops.

Elizabeth prolonged her resistance until December 1442, when a peace treaty was signed at Győr under the auspices of Cardinal Julian Cesarini. Elizabeth died not long after meeting Władysław III and exchanging gifts; her supporters claimed that she was poisoned on his orders to prevent their marriage. Cesarini had the treaty ratified by Frederick under the pressure of Pope Eugene, though Frederick abstained from doing so until May 1444. The internal unrest caused Hungary to become vulnerable militarily and severely weakened for the Turkish campaign.

=== Crusade against the Muslim Ottomans, 1443–1444 ===
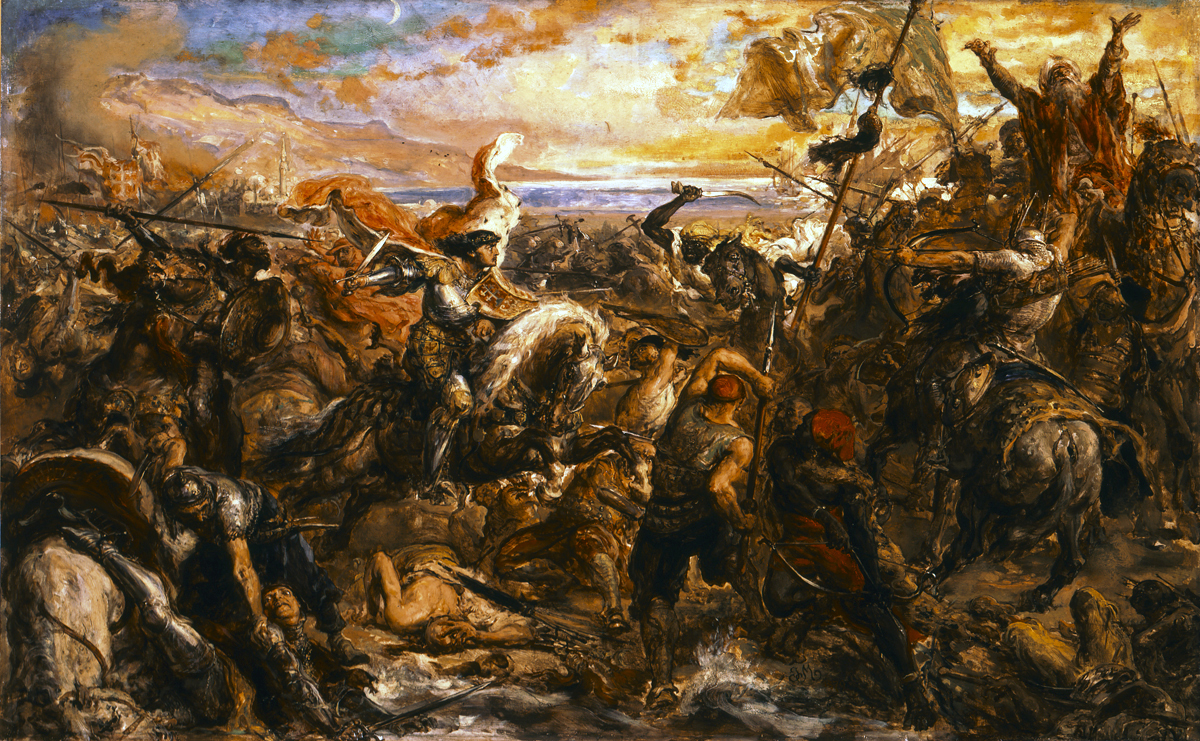
Władysław III at the Battle of Varna, as imagined by Jan Matejko.

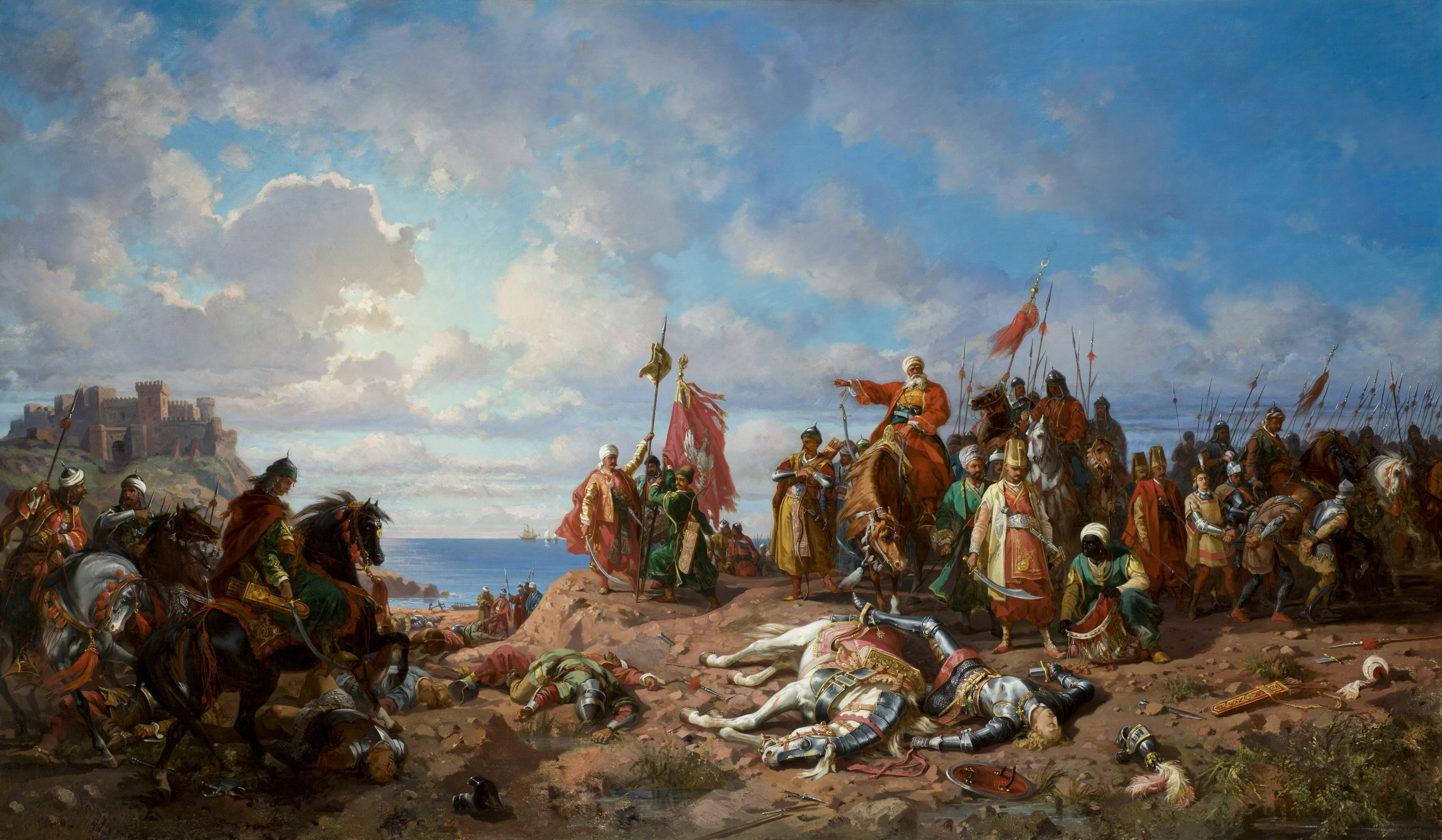
Władysław at Varna, as imagined by Stanisław Chlebowski.

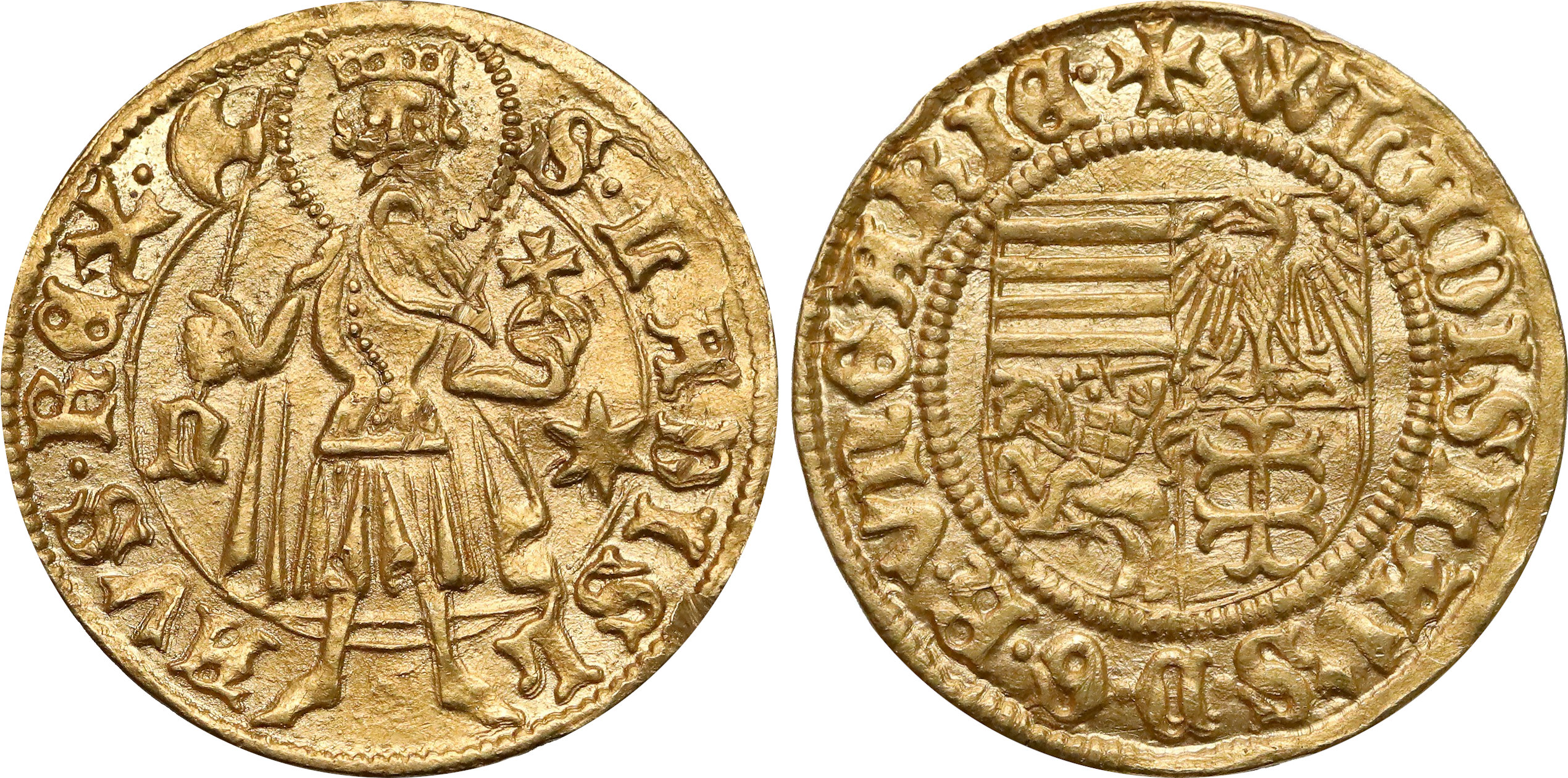
A guilder featuring Władysław's effigy and coat of arms

The prelude to the crusade began when the Turks were defeated in the Hungarian–Ottoman War of 1437–1442 and temporarily lost jurisdiction over the Principality of Wallachia. In 1442, Sultan Murad II sent Mezid Bey into Transylvania with a large akinji army, raiding cities, towns and villages from the border to Sibiu (known in German as Hermannstadt and in Hungarian as Nagyszeben). Hunyadi initially lost the skirmish and one of the Hungarian leaders, Bishop György Lépes, was killed at Sântimbru, Alba. However, a few days later, Hunyadi regrouped and attacked Ottoman positions with heavy cavalry at the Battle of Hermannstadt, capturing and beheading Mezid. This empowered Hungary to coerce the Wallachians and Moldavians to change loyalty and turn into the vassals of Hungary. Murad sought revenge and entrusted Hadım Şehabeddin, governor-general of Rumelia, with a new force to enter Wallachia; he too was defeated by Hunyadi near the Ialomița River.

Throughout the autumn of 1442, Cesarini and the Republic of Venice were planning a crusade against the Turks, with the papacy pledging patronage and considerable funding. The united force would set out from Hungary with an assembled fleet under Francesco Condulmer stationed at the Dardanelles Strait. The objective was to isolate routes and communication from Anatolia to Europe, protect Constantinople, and join with the land troops to capture Turkish defensive posts on the River Danube, thus leaving the Ottoman main army caught in Anatolia. Cesarini, acting as papal legate and gathering support, disseminated slogans and propaganda that would incite the Christian army to act. Moreover, Italian humanist Francesco Filelfo wrote a personal letter to Władysław, describing him in Latin as the propugnaculum, or the "bulwark of Christianity". On the other hand, Vlad II Dracul tried to dissuade Władysław III from waging war against the Ottomans. Nevertheless, Vlad II provided 7,000 (according to some accounts 4,000) horsemen under the command of his son, Mircea II of Wallachia, to fight against the Ottomans.

On 15 April 1444, at the diet in Buda and in the presence of Cardinal Cesarini, Władysław III swore to renew the war against Turkish infidels in the coming summer. Similar promises were made to the Venetian delegates, the Signoria of Florence and to the Kingdom of Bosnia. Philip the Good, Duke of Burgundy was also a generous benefactor to the Christian cause. Simultaneously, Władysław III engaged Stojka Gisdanić and dispatched him to Edirne as an envoy and mediator in peace talks with the Ottomans. In June 1444, the fleet of Francesco Condulmer and Alvise Loredan was ready to sail and by mid-July arrived at Methoni, Messenia, in modern-day Greece. Murad already crossed into Asia Minor by this time and the fleet was tasked with preventing re-entry by holding the strait against him.

In August, a Polish assembly at Piotrków implored him to make peace with the Ottomans, dissatisfied with the level of taxes raised for the war and believing that Murad's terms could be lucrative. The Poles were convinced that this would encourage Władysław to leave the Balkans, return to Poland and re-establish himself there as king. Meanwhile, Cesarini sent letters of progress to Cyriacus of Ancona, who was staying in Constantinople; he then translated them from Latin into Greek for John VIII Palaiologos, Byzantine emperor. The Byzantines were ecstatic about the news brought by Cesarini, as were the Genoese colonies and Pera (Galata). Cyriacus also distributed letters to Neapolitan nobility and to Alfonso V of Aragon, urging them to join the campaign. The victory of Jean de Lastic and his Knights Hospitaller in the Siege of Rhodes contributed to the general euphoria surrounding the crusade.

In mid-August 1444, the Peace of Szeged was ratified in Oradea (Várad). However, Władysław III abjured his oath and the war continued; on 20 September 1444, the king and Hunyadi crossed the Danube, beginning the army's march to the shores of the Black Sea to make contact with the allied fleet. The Pope annulled and released Gjergj Arianiti from the peace he made with the Turks; Arianiti was then able to march with his troops to Macedonia and fight alongside the Christians if required. At this time, Murad concluded a favourable peace treaty with Ibrahim II of Karaman, who threatened Anatolia from the south. It allowed the Turks to focus their attention and resources on advancing into Europe; in late October 1444 he crossed the Bosphorus while the Christian fleet was stalled from adverse winds, and the Venetians did not make an effort to prevent that. Scholar Poggio Bracciolini appraised that as the true cause of the crusade's early failure. Genoese merchants and sailors were also accused of corruption and accepting bribes from Murad. According to witnesses, the Ottoman troops outnumbered the combined Christian forces and quickly marched to the Black Sea without a delay.

=== Battle at Varna, disappearance and succession, 1444-1447 ===
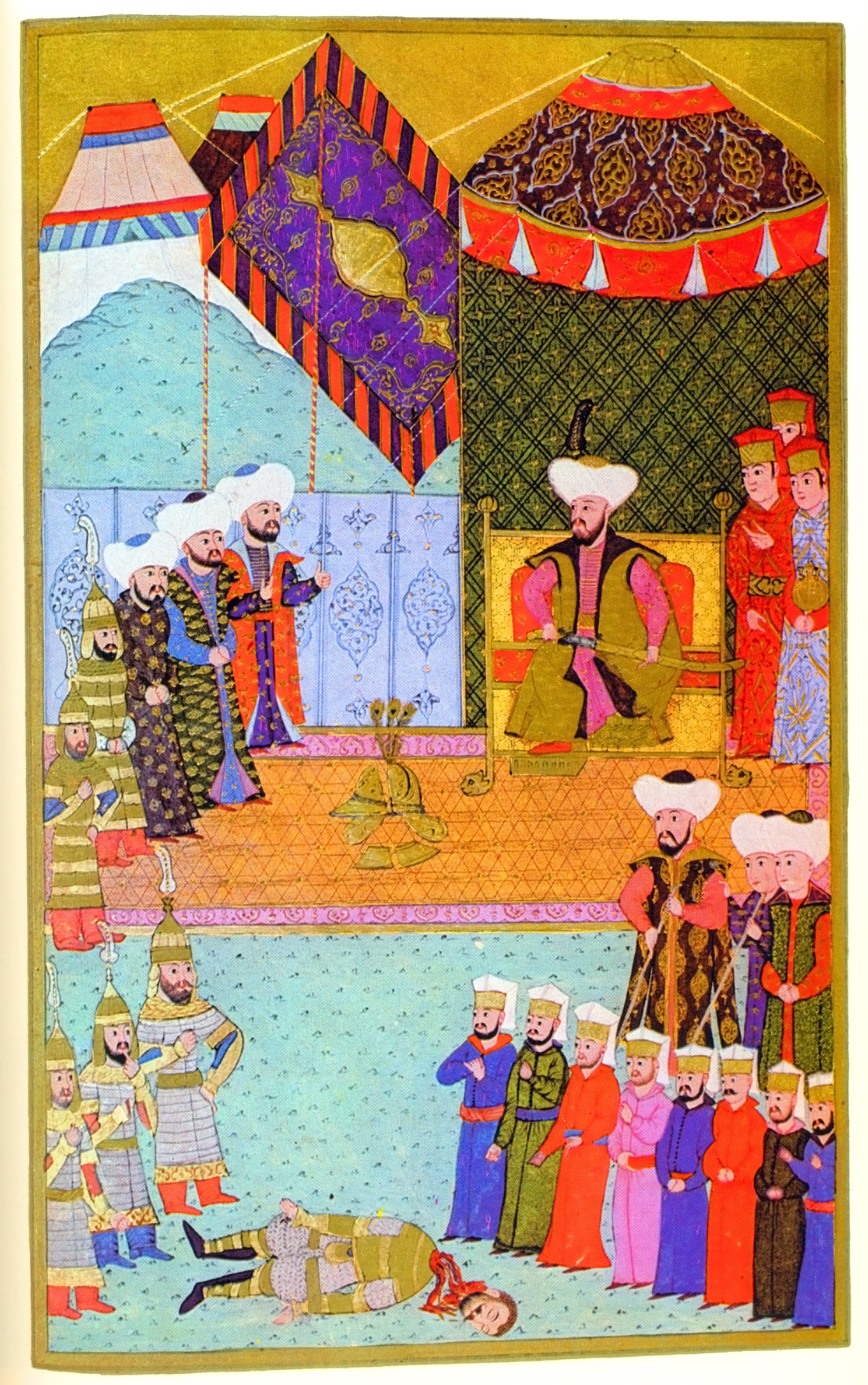
Imaginary Ottoman miniature depicting Murad II and Władysław III's beheading, held at Topkapı Palace.

The Venetian treachery placed the large Ottoman army of around 60,000 men in proximity to the unsuspecting 16,000 crusaders, almost outnumbering the Christians by three to one. The crusader fleet, largely manned by Venetian mercenaries and sailors, did not engage in direct combat and desisted from sailing into the Black Sea. Thereafter, the battle began on 10 November 1444 at Varna, Bulgaria; the crusaders were initially successful in defending against Ottoman assaults and Murad sustained heavy losses. Acts of heroism were abundant on the Christian side, almost making up for the lack of men; as was the courage displayed on the battlefield by John Hunyadi. Murad was wary of the battle at first and contemplated escaping when the crusaders took the left flank, but the Janissaries restrained him.

Hunyadi is purported to have proposed that the Christian left assist the right flank to move the Turks out of position, and stated that "the son of Osman's army shall be defeated". The Ottoman troops under Hadım Şehabeddin of Rumelia began to break and some fled the battle, though the Turkish resistance was fierce. One of the crusaders, Andreas de Pallatio, later wrote in his memoirs that Władysław III seized the initiative on the Christian right flank and tore into Şehabeddin's ranks like "a new Caesar", pushing the Rumelians up the valley's slope. Many of the novice yet still elite Janissaries and azebs were driven back. Pallatio also notes that the size of Murad's army was too great to counter and it seemed as if the Christian offensive barely inflicted any major casualties. Władysław III's men quickly became exhausted, with many wounded by arrows and battered, including Hunyadi. In spite of this, the majority of the Ottoman army either fled or was dead. Consequently, Murad decided to seek refuge in his fortified encampment in the rear.

Facing desperate circumstances and seeing John Hunyadi's struggle against the Rumelian sipahis, Władysław III decided to take a chance by directly charging the sultan's camp and his armed retinue with heavy cavalry. Few men were able to see the charge and no one returned from the assault, which alarmed the crusaders. The young king lost from the sight when his charge lost impetus and came to a standstill amongst the unyielding Janissaries protecting the sultan. It is possible that the king's horse fell into a trap; Pope Pius II writes that Władysław III might have been dismounted from his horse by the Turks.

According to three Turkish sources – one of anonymous author, other two written by Sadeddin Effendi and Neşri – the Janissaries reportedly killed the king's bodyguard, beheaded Władysław III and displayed his head on a lance, spear or pole; his supposed killer was the Jannisarry whose name is given in sources as KaradĪa Khizr, KodĪa Chyzyr, KodĪa Khizr or KodĪa Hyzyr. However, those records come solely from Turkish side and were written decades and centuries after the battle had taken place; they are directly contradicted by the Murad II's personal memorandum, which claimed Władysław survived the battle and was executed in Ottoman captivity.

Written in Poland by Kallimach, relation of the battle told by its participant Gregory of Sanok states only that the King disappeared during battle under "fussilade of [Turkish] arrows", but makes no mention of his death; Gregory also never confirmed his ruler's death to Queen Mother Sophia of Halshany nor to king's brother and eventual successor on Polish throne, Casimir. Records mention a severed male head candied in a bowl of honey by the Turks, but the head contained blond hair, and Władysław III had dark-hair. Disheartened by the presumed death of the king, the Hungarian Army fled the battlefield, and the remainder surrendered. On his return, Hunyadi tried frantically to salvage the king's body; neither Władysław's body nor his armour were ever found.

Władysław III was succeeded in Poland by his younger brother, Duke Casimir of Lithuania, in 1447, after a three-year interregnum. In Hungary, he was succeeded by his former rival, the child-king Ladislaus the Posthumous.

==== Possible survival ====
Grand Duke of Bosnia Stjepan Vukčić Kosača claimed Władysław III survived the battle. Enea Piccolomini also reported in 1445 circulating rumours about the King being alive, alongside a list of different places where he was supposedly seen.

According to a Portuguese legend, Władysław III survived the battle and then journeyed in secrecy to the Holy Land. He became a knight of Saint Catharine of Mount Sinai (O Cavaleiro de Santa Catarina) and then settled on Madeira. King Afonso V of Portugal granted him lands in the Madalena do Mar district of the Madeira Islands for life. He was known there as Henrique Alemão (Henry the German) and married Senhorinha Anes, with the King of Portugal acting as his best man. The marriage produced two children: Sigismund and Barbara. He established a church of Saint Catherine and Mary Magdalene at Madalena do Mar in 1471. There he was depicted in a painting as Saint Joachim meeting Saint Anne at the Golden Gate on a painting by Master of the Adoration of Machico (Mestre da Adoração de Machico) in the beginning of the 16th century. Henrique died during storm at sea, as years later his son Sigismund.

Sasek of Międzygóra mentions that during his journey as member of entourage of Lev of Rožmitál in 1466, in vicinity of Cantalapiedra the group met a recluse, who was recognized as Władysław by another Polish participant, based on his apparent resemblance to the missing former king of Poland, as well as having six toes on the feet (feature shared with Władysław). The recluse dismissed him, neither confirming nor denying his identity.

In 1472 Nicolaus Floris of Order of Friars Minor sent a letter to Teutonic Order claiming that Władysław lives on Madeira (where Henrique Alemão also resided, though Floris makes no mention about potential connection between the two).

The possibility of Władysław's survival, and him living either under identity of Henrique or as hermit, was being seriously considered by Polish humanist and amateur-historian Leopold Kielanowski, as well as Portuguese historian Rois Gomez and Bohemian historian Rudolf Urbanek; the matter is extensively discussed by Polish journalist Zbigniew Święch in his book on the King, The Last Crusader of Europe [Ostatni krzyżowiec Europy].

It was speculated by Święch and Kielanowski that if the King survived the battle, he might have not returned first due to humiliation caused by defeat under Varna, and subsequently because of political situations of his kingdoms where the new rulers had already ascended.

== Appearance and personal life ==
According to 19th century sources based on medieval chronicles, Władysław III was of medium height, with a swarthy (olive) complexion, dark hair, dark eyes, and possessed a graceful gaze. There are no other accounts disclosing his physical appearance. He did not indulge in overeating or excessive drinking, and was a person of extreme patience and piety. Furthermore, the king was known to be of strong character and merciful to his foes, when required.

Władysław III had no children and did not marry. Contemporary sources suggest that he was homosexual. The chronicler Jan Długosz, known for his antipathy towards the Jagiellons, alleged that there was something unusual about the monarch's sexuality. Długosz did not specify the details behind that but stated "too subject to his carnal desires" and "he did not abandon his lewd and despicable habits". On the other hand, Długosz noted later, "No age has ever seen and will never see a more Catholic and holy ruler who, according to his highest goodness, has never harmed any Christian. [...] Finally, like a holy king and a second angel on Earth, he lived an unmarried and virgin life at home and during the war".

== Legacy ==
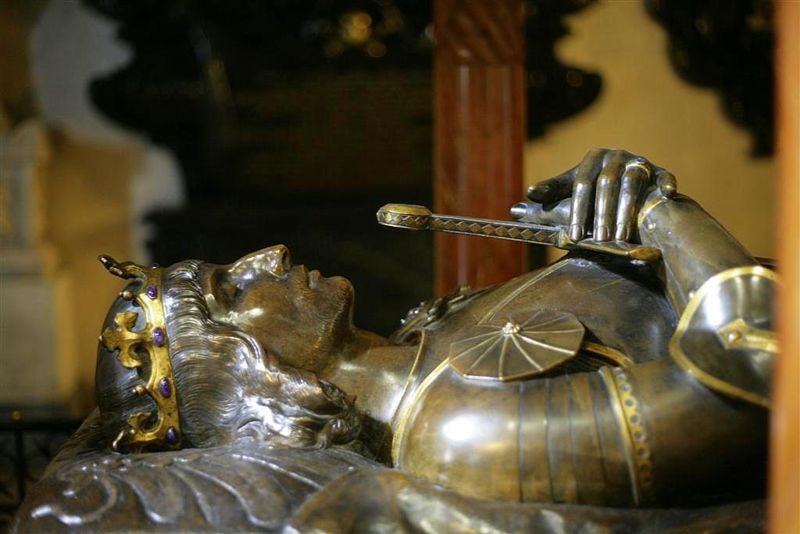
A cenotaph featuring Władysław III's effigy at Wawel Cathedral. The king's body was never found and his tomb remains empty.

Władysław III's legacy as King of Hungary was tarnished in existing records by the Habsburgs; the largely unrealistic picture of his reign presented in the Annales chronicles was constructed as a consistent polemic comprising the allegations of what is described as "Habsburg propaganda". Furthermore, Władysław III's claim to Hungary was deemed illegitimate and he was often portrayed as a usurper who unsuccessfully launched a crusade against the Turks. Rumours also spread that Władysław III had Elizabeth of Luxembourg poisoned, as her death occurred suddenly after their meeting in December 1442.

Following his death, Władysław III was commemorated in many songs and poems.

A main boulevard and residential district in Varna are named after Władysław. In 1935, a park-museum, Władysław Warneńczyk, opened in Varna, with a symbolic cenotaph built atop an ancient Thracian mound tomb. There had also been a football team named after Vladislav in Varna; in the present day, its inheritor is known as PFC Cherno More Varna.

The Hungarian book series about John Hunyadi was adapted into a television miniseries, Rise of the Raven, released in 2025. The series also depicts the rise of Vladislaus I to the throne of the Kingdom of Hungary and dramatizes events surrounding the Battle of Varna.

== Gallery ==
Gallery

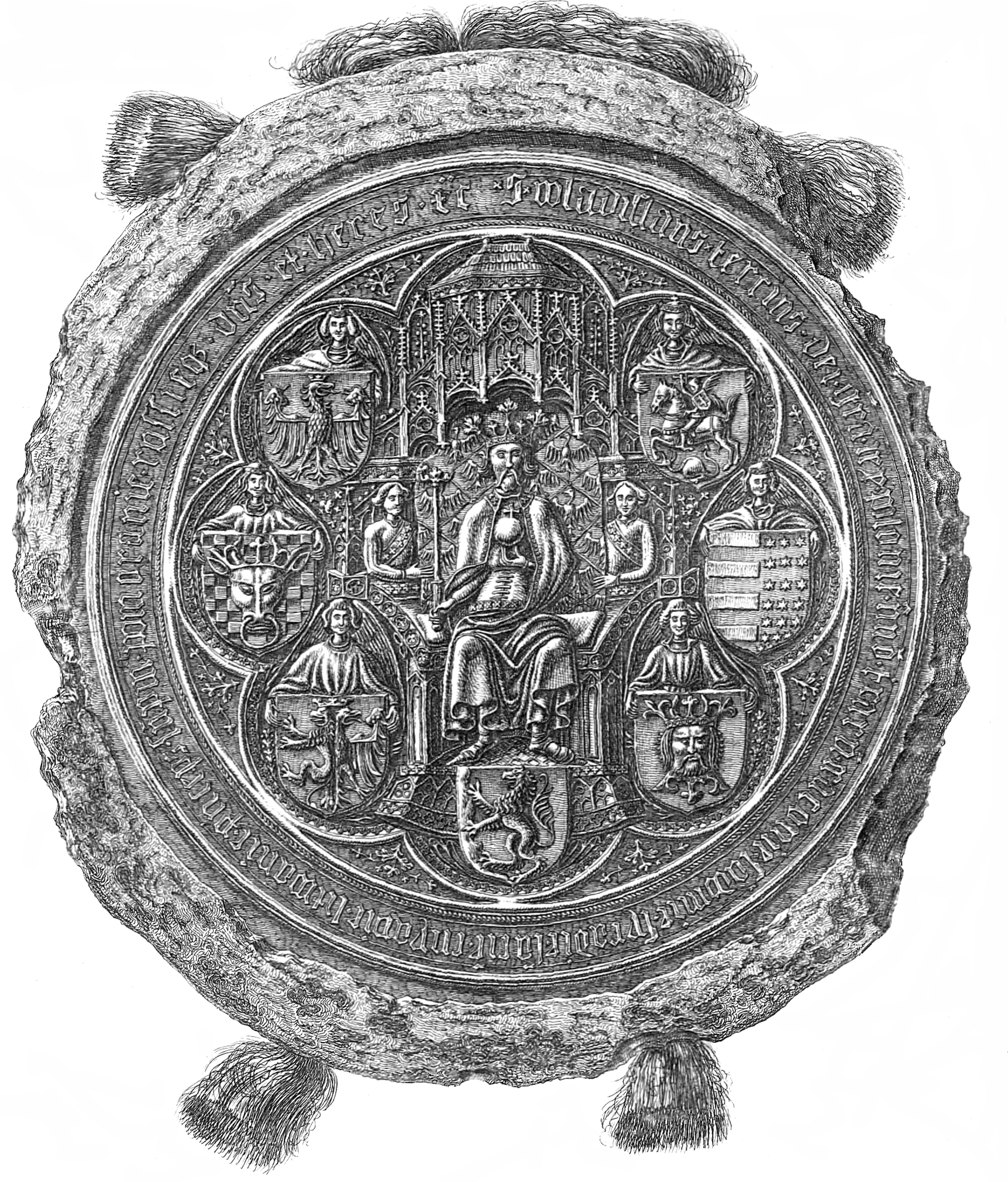
The Royal Seal of Władysław III, 1438

Coat of arms featuring the symbols of Poland, Lithuania and Hungary

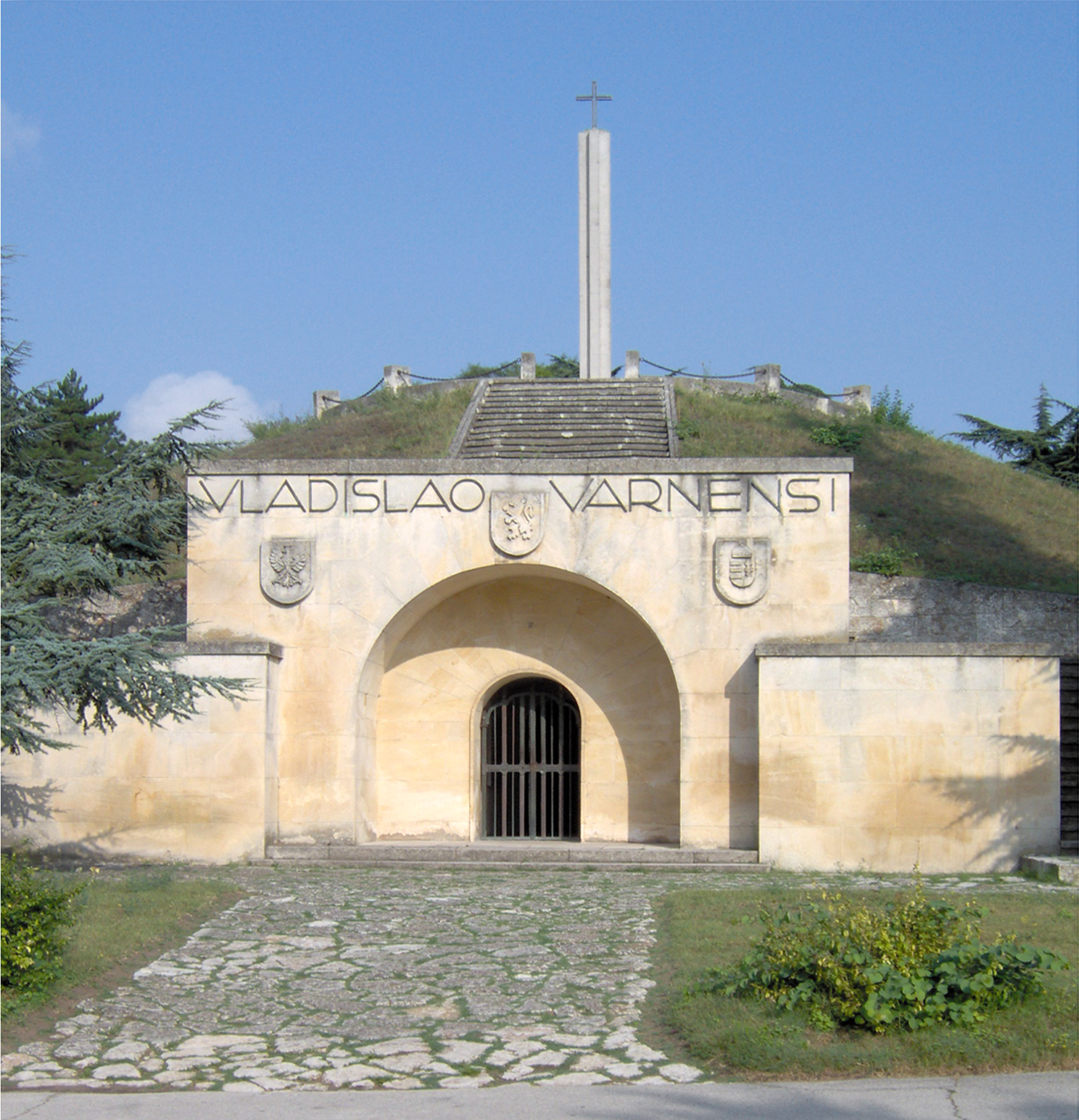
The Memorial of the Battle in Varna, built on an ancient Thracian mound tomb, bearing the name of the fallen king.

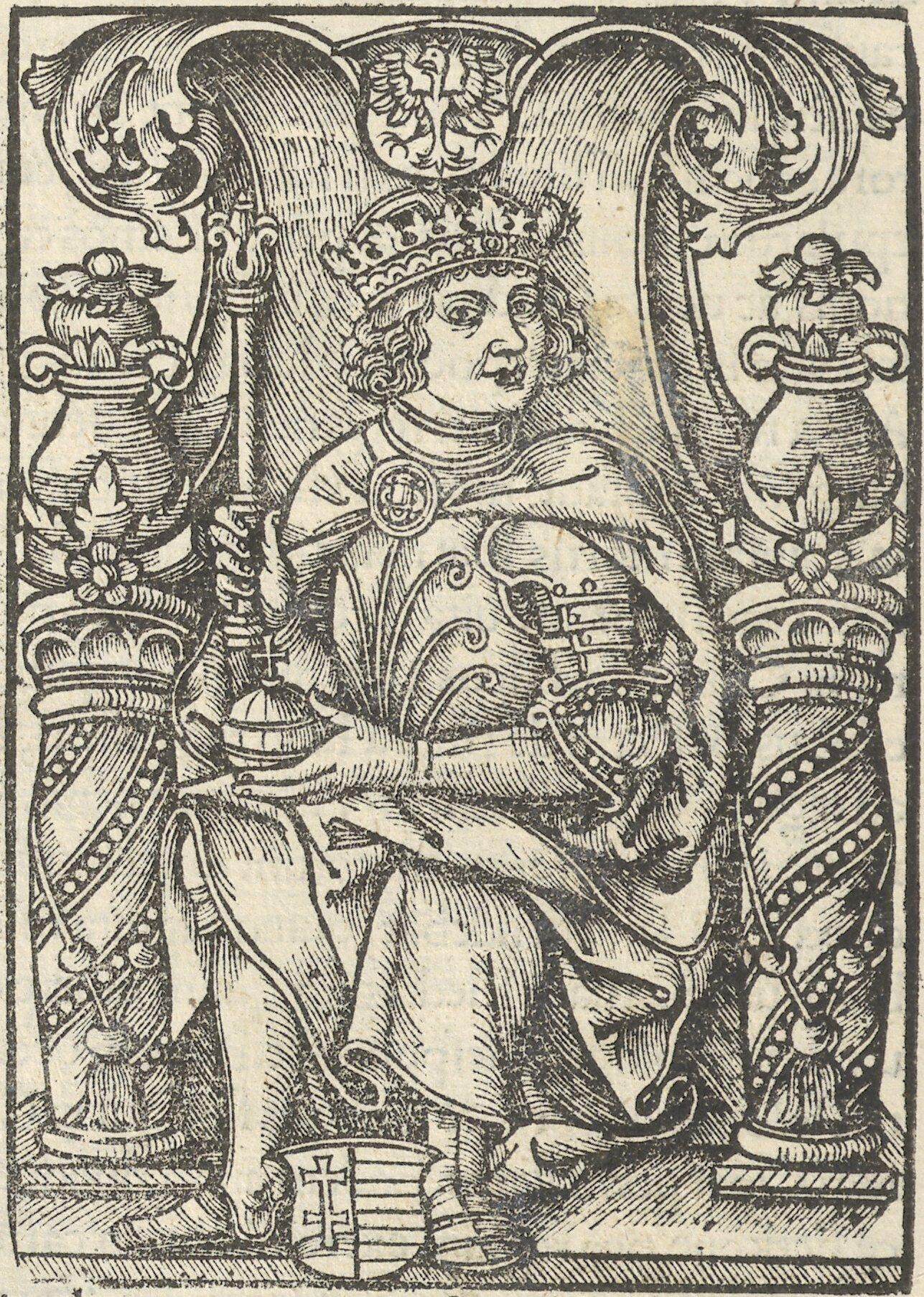
A more accurate portrayal in the Chronica Polonorum, 1521

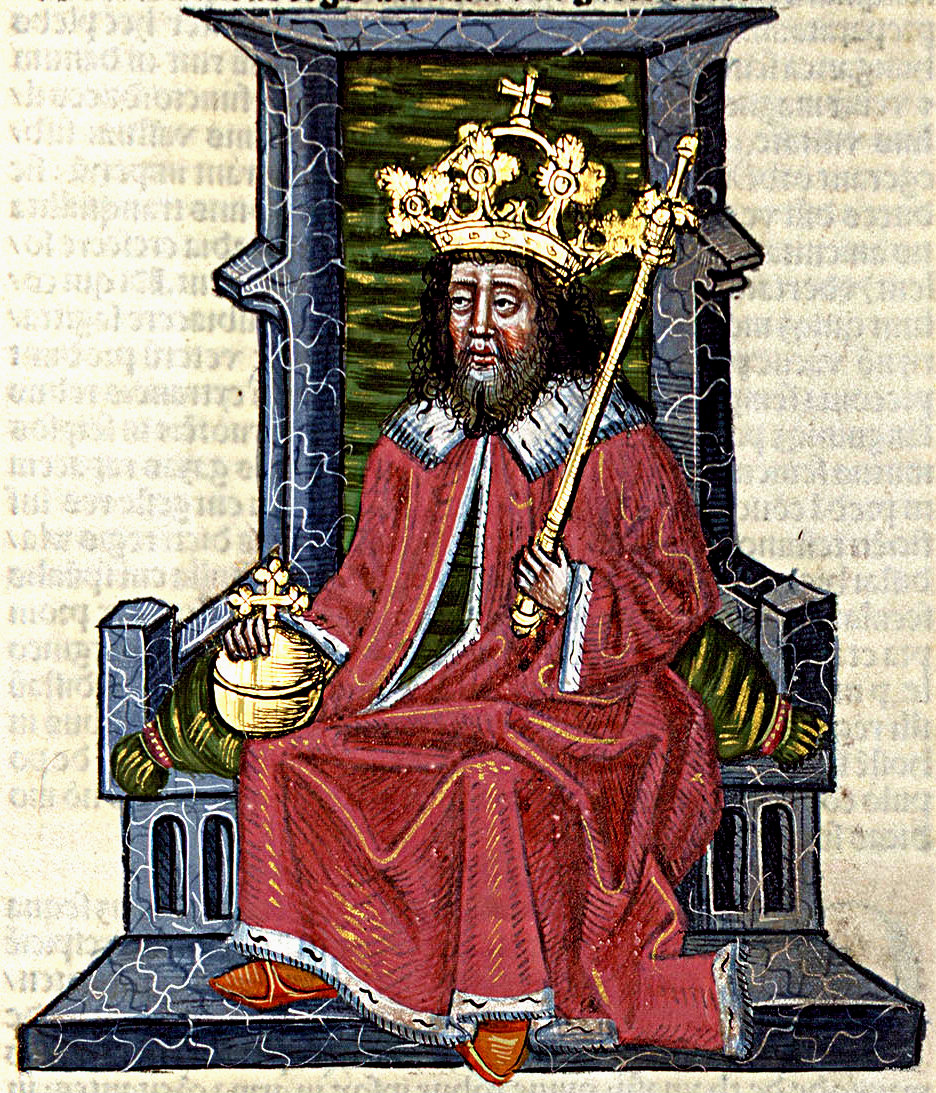
Imaginary portrait from Thuróczi János' Chronica Hungarorum (Władysław III was only 20 when he died)

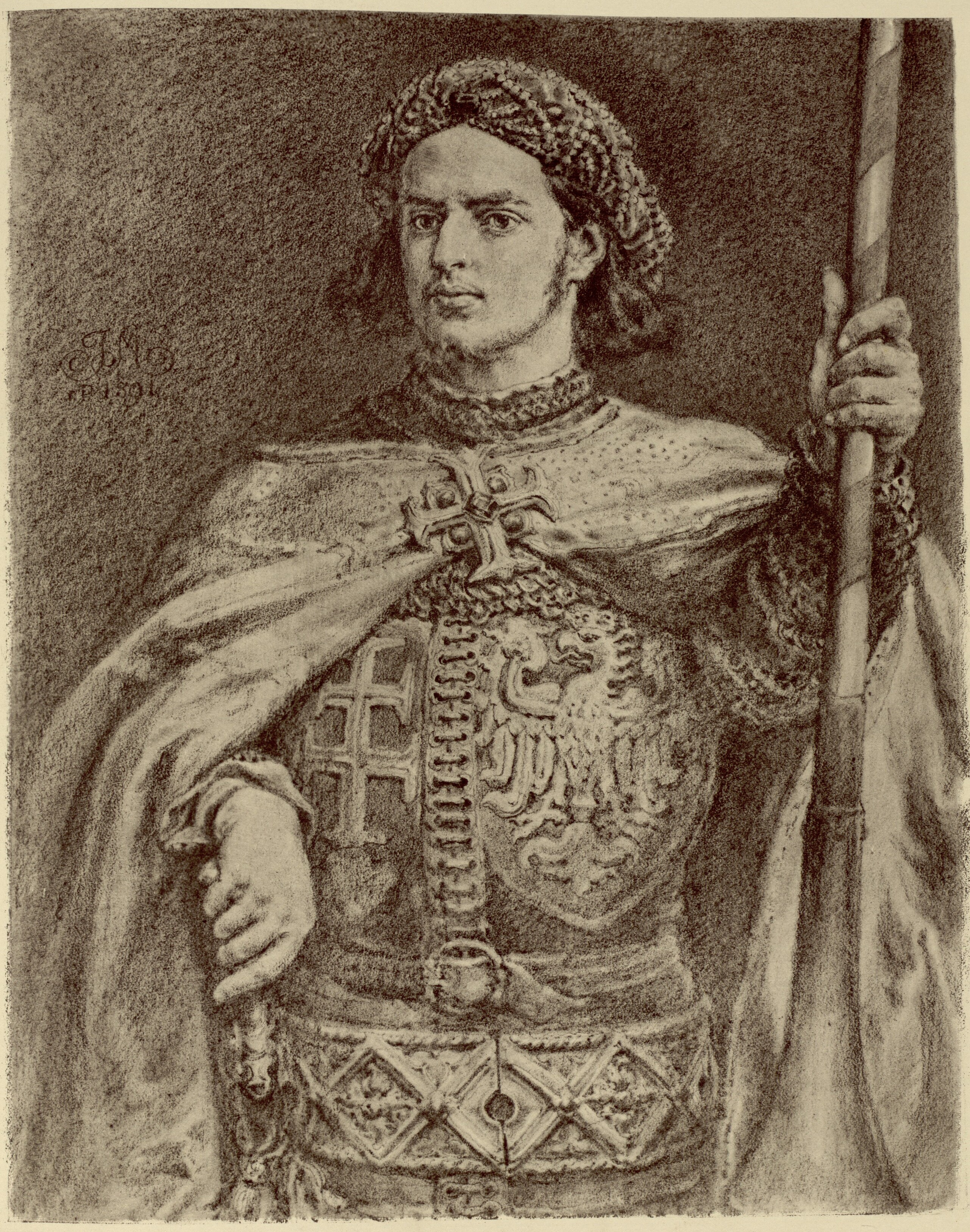
Drawing by Jan Matejko, a 19th century imaginary depiction based on historical accounts

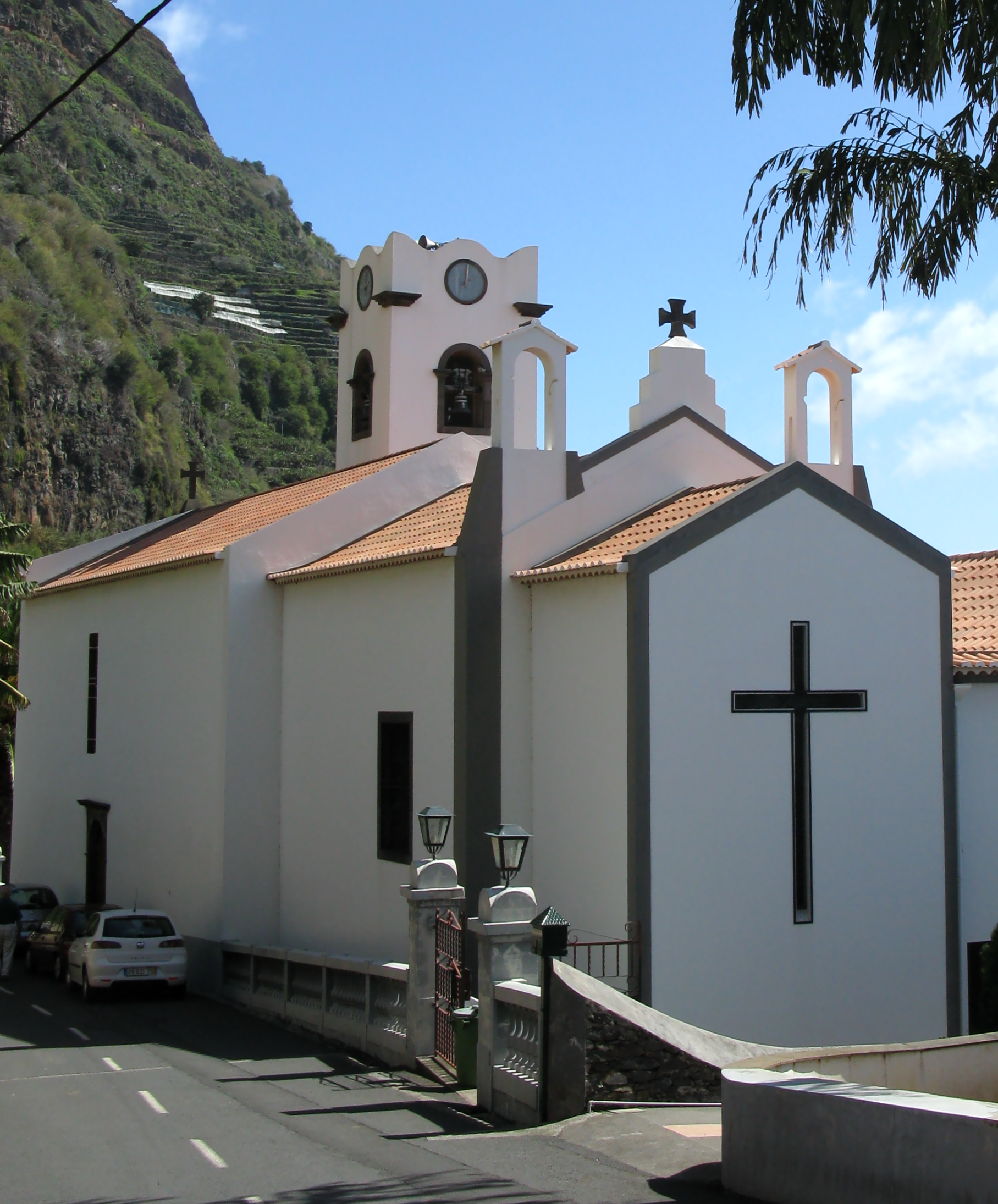
Church, Madalena do Mar, Madeira, hypothetical burial place of Władysław III

== See also ==
- History of Poland (1385–1569)
- List of Polish monarchs

== Bibliography ==
- Ágoston, Gábor (2023). The Last Muslim Conquest. The Ottoman Empire and Its Wars in Europe. Princeton University Press. ISBN 9780691205397.
- Beller, Steven (2006). A Concise History of Austria. Cambridge University Press. ISBN 9780521478861.
- Besala, Jerzy (2003). Tajemnice historii Polski. Poznań: Wydawn. Podsiedlik-Raniowski i Spółka. ISBN 9788373414341.
- Błachowska, Katarzyna (2009). Wiele historii jednego państwa: obraz dziejów Wielkiego Księstwa Litewskiego do 1569 roku w ujęciu historyków polskich, rosyjskich, ukraińskich, litewskich i białoruskich w XIX (in Polish). Warszawa (Warsaw): Neriton. ISBN 9788375430769.
- Bunar, Piotr; Sroka, Stanisław (1996). Wojny, bitwy i potyczki w średniowiecznej Polsce (in Polish). Kraków: Universitas. ISBN 9788370524449.
- Cazacu, Matei (2017). Dracula. Leiden: Brill Publishers. ISBN 9789004349216.
- Davis, G. Doug (2024). Croatian Cultural Renaissance. From the Margins to the Crossroad of Europe. Lanham: Lexington Books. ISBN 9781666958706.
- Długosz, Jan (1869). Jana Długosza, kanonika krakowskiego, Dziejów polskich ksia̜g dwanaście (in Polish). Vol. 4. Kraków: Czas. OCLC 919560600.
- Duczmal, Małgorzata (1996). Jagiellonowie. Leksykon biograficzny (in Polish). Kraków: Wydawnictwo Literackie. ISBN 9788308025772.
- Frost, Robert I. (2018). The Oxford History of Poland-Lithuania. Vol. 1. Oxford University Press. ISBN 9780192568144.
- Gieysztor, Aleksander (1998). "The kingdom of Poland and the grand duchy of Lithuania, 1370–1506". The New Cambridge Medieval History, c.1415–c.1500. Vol. 7. Cambridge University Press. pp. 734–735. ISBN 0-521-38296-3.
- Giurescu, Constantin C.; Matei, Horia C. (1976). Histoire Chronologique de la Roumanie (in French). Editura științifică și enciclopedică.
- Jasienica, Paweł (1978). Jagiellonian Poland. Miami: American Institute of Polish Culture. ISBN 978-1-881284-01-7. OCLC 837234270.
- Jefferson, John (2012). The Holy Wars of King Wladislas and Sultan Murad. The Ottoman-Christian Conflict from 1438-1444. Leiden: Brill Publishers. ISBN 9789004229259.
- Kiaupa, Zigmantas (2000). The History of Lithuania Before 1795 (English ed.). Vilnius: Lithuanian Institute of History. pp. 154–155. ISBN 9986810132.
- Kiaupienė, Jūratė (2008). "Gediminaičiai ir Jogailaičiai prie Vytauto palikimo". Gimtoji istorija. Nuo 7 iki 12 klasės (in Lithuanian). Vilnius: Elektroninės leidybos namai. ISBN 978-9986921691.
- Kiliński, Teodor (1872). Dzieje narodu polskiego z tablicą chronologiczną aż do naszych czasów dla użytku młodżiezy z dodatkiem jeografii i mapy dawnéj Polski (in Polish). Poznań: Kamieński i Spółka. OCLC 1412087021.
- Korytkowski, Jan (1883). Prałaci i kanonicy Katedry Metropolitalnej Gnieźnieńskiej (in Polish). Gniezno: Langi. OCLC 1355986126.
- Kwiatkowski, Saturnin (1883). Ostatnie lata Władysława Warneńczyka (in Polish). Lwów: Gubrynowicz i Schmidt. OCLC 749409692.
- Lewandowski, Piotr (2014). Grzech sodomii w przestrzeni politycznej, prawnej i społecznej Polski nowożytnej (in Polish). Będzin: e-bookowo.pl. ISBN 9788378594239.
- Mačiukas, Žydrūnas (2015). "LDK vidaus karo atomazga: Pabaisko mūšio 580-osioms metinėms paminėti" (in Lithuanian). Lietuvos žinios. Archived from the original on 23 September 2016.
- Malone-Lee, Michael (2023). Cardinal Bessarion (1403–1472): Most Latin of Greeks, Most Greek of Latins. Abingdon, Oxon: Routledge. doi:10.4324/9781003371151. ISBN 978-1-003-37115-1. OCLC 1412038889.
- Michalik, Marian B.; Małecki, Jan M.; Kurz, Andrzej (1996). Kronika Krakowa (in Polish). Kraków: Wydawn. Kronika. ISBN 9788386079070.
- Michałowska, Teresa (1995). Średniowiecze (in Polish) (First ed.). Warszawa (Warsaw): Wydawnictwo Naukowe PWN. pp. 697–706. ISBN 8301114525.
- Mikulec, Jiří; Polívka, Miloslav (2007). Per saecula ad tempora nostra (in Czech and Polish). Vol. 1. Praha (Prague): Historický ústav Akademie věd České republiky. ISBN 9788072861163.
- Murray, Alan V. (2006). The Crusades [4 Volumes]. Santa Barbara: ABC-Clio. ISBN 9781576078631.
- Museranu, Camil (2018). John Hunyadi. Defender of Christendom. Las Vegas: Histria Books. ISBN 9781592111152.
- Muzeum Historii Polski. "Władysław III Warneńczyk". muzhp.pl.
- Nowakowska, Natalia (2017). Church, State and Dynasty in Renaissance Poland. Taylor & Francis, Routledge. ISBN 9781351951555.
- Pálosfalvi, Tamás (2002). "V. László". In Kristó, Gyula (ed.). Magyarország vegyes házi királyai [The Kings of Various Dynasties of Hungary] (in Hungarian). Szukits Könyvkiadó. pp. 139–150. ISBN 963-9441-58-9.
- Olejnik, Karol (1996). Władysław III Warneńczyk (in Polish). Szczecin: Wydawn. Archiwum Państwowego "Dokument". ISBN 9788386992102.
- Pac, Teresa (2022). Common Culture and the Ideology of Difference in Medieval and Contemporary Poland. Lanham, Maryland: Lexington Books. ISBN 9781793626929.
- Piechocki, Katharina N. (2021). Cartographic Humanism. The Making of Early Modern Europe. University of Chicago Press. ISBN 9780226816814.
- Pope Pius II (2013). Europe (c. 1400–1458). Washington, D.C.: The Catholic University of America Press. ISBN 9780813221823.
- Prokop, Krzysztof Rafał (2001). Polscy kardynałowie (in Polish). Kraków: WAM. ISBN 9788370978655.
- Reddaway, W. F.; Penson, J. H.; Halecki, Oskar; Dyboski, R. (1950). The Cambridge history of Poland from the origins to Sobieski - to 1696. Cambridge University Press. OCLC 877250752.
- Scott, Hamish M. (2015). The Oxford Handbook of Early Modern European History, 1350-1750. Vol. 2. Oxford University Press. ISBN 9780199597260.
- Setton, Kenneth Meyer (1969). A History of the Crusades. Vol. 6. Madison: University of Wisconsin Press. ISBN 9780299107444.
- Setton, Kenneth Meyer (1976). The Papacy and the Levant, 1204–1571. Vol. 2. Philadelphia: American Philosophical Society. ISBN 9780871691149.
- Shirogorov, Vladimir (2021). War on the Eve of Nations. Lexington Books. ISBN 9781793622419.
- Šmahel, František (2011). "The Hussite Revolution (1419–1471)". In Pánek, Jaroslav; Tůma, Oldřich (eds.). A History of the Czech Lands. Charles University. pp. 149–187. ISBN 978-80-246-1645-2.
- Sokołowski, August; Inlender, Adolf (1897). Dzieje Polski illustrowane (in Polish). Vol. 2. Vienna: Moritz Perles. OCLC 726801449.
- Solymosi, László; Körmendi, Adrienne (1981). "A középkori magyar állam virágzása és bukása, 1301–1526 [The Heyday and Fall of the Medieval Hungarian State, 1301–1526]". In Solymosi, László (ed.). Magyarország történeti kronológiája, I: a kezdetektől 1526-ig [Historical Chronology of Hungary, Volume I: From the Beginning to 1526] (in Hungarian). Akadémiai Kiadó. pp. 188–228. ISBN 963-05-2661-1.
- Spórna, Marcin; Wierzbicki, Piotr; Wygonik, Edyta (2004). Słownik władców Polski i pretendentów do tronu polskiego (in Polish). Kraków: Wydawn. Zielona Sowa. ISBN 9788372205605.
- Stone, Daniel Z. (2014). The Polish-Lithuanian State, 1386–1795. University of Washington Press. ISBN 9780295803623.
- Sužiedėlis, Saulius (2011). Historical Dictionary of Lithuania. Lanham: Scarecrow Press. ISBN 9780810875364.
- Sužiedėlis, Simas, ed. (1970–1978). "Švitrigaila". Encyclopedia Lituanica. Vol. V. Boston, Massachusetts: Juozas Kapočius. pp. 348–350. LCCN 74-114275.
- Święch, Zbigniew (1995). Klątwy, mikroby i uczeni. Tom 3, część 1: Ostatni Krzyżowiec Europy. Oddychający sarkofag – astralne życie Warneńczyka? (in Polish). Wydawnictwo Wawelskie. ISBN 83-85347-09-7.
- Urban, William (2003). Tannenberg and After. Chicago: Lithuanian Research and Studies Center. pp. 311–313. ISBN 0929700252.
- Topolski, Jerzy (1986). An outline history of Poland. Warsaw: Interpress. ISBN 9788322321188.
- Treptow, Kurt (2022). Vlad III Dracula. The Life and Times of the Historical Dracula. Las Vegas: Histria Books. ISBN 9781592112142.
- Wolnicka, Agnieszka (2017). "Czy Władysław Warneńczyk był gejem?". ciekawostkihistoryczne.pl. Ciekawostki Historyczne.
- ZPE. "Władysław Warneńczyk: Nadzieja dynastii". zpe.gov.pl (in Polish). Ministerstwo Edukacji i Nauki.
- Związek Literatów Polskich (1961). Twórczość (in Polish). Vol. 17. Warszawa (Warsaw): Prasa-Książka-Ruch. OCLC 1767892.

Władysław III of Poland Jagiellon dynasty Born: 31 October 1424 Died: 10 November 1444 (?)
Regnal titles
Preceded by Władysław II Jagiełło	King of Poland; 1434 – 1444	Succeeded by Casimir IV Jagiellon
Preceded by Albert II of Germany	King of Hungary and Croatia disputed by Ladislaus V 1440 – 1444	Succeeded by Ladislaus V
