= Ponta do Sol, Madeira =

Ponta do Sol
- Municipality
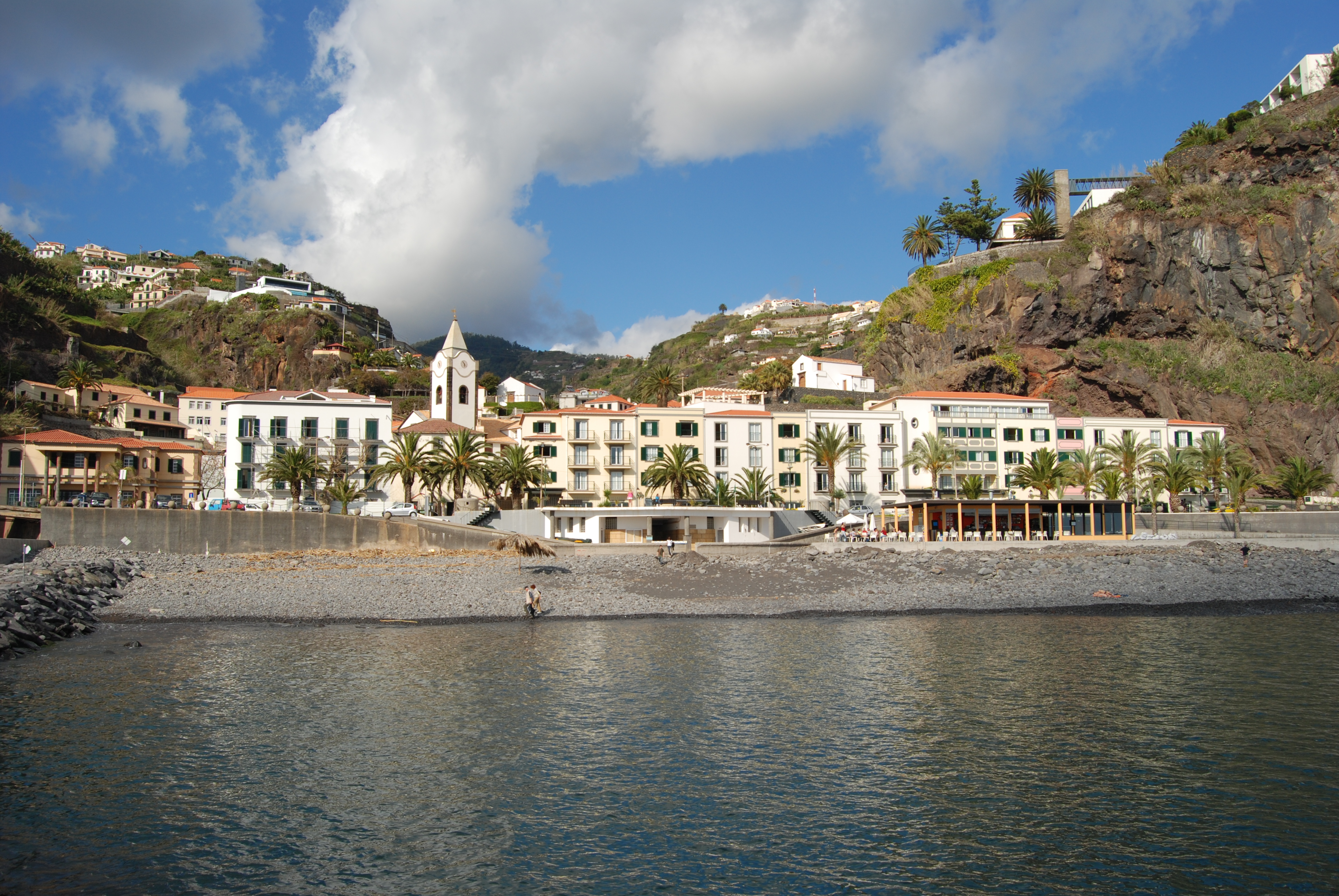
- The seafront of Ponta do Sol

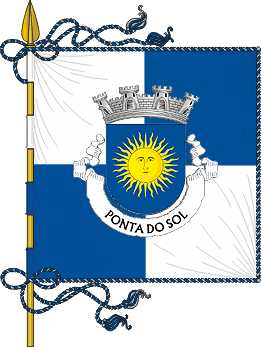
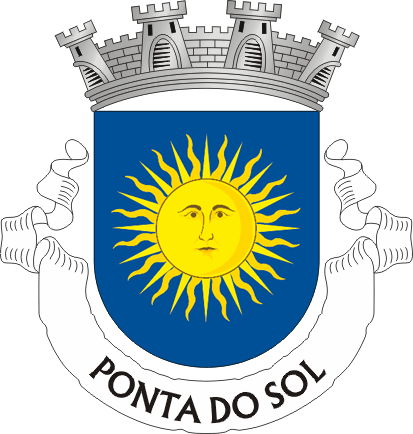
- Flag Coat of arms
- Interactive map of Ponta do Sol
- Coordinates: 32°40′50″N 17°6′15″W
- Country: Portugal
- Auton. region: Madeira
- Island: Madeira
- Established: Settlement: c. 1420; Municipality: 2 December 1501
- Parishes: 3

Government
  - President: Celia Marques Luís

Area
  - Total: 46.19 km^{2} (17.83 sq mi)
- Elevation: 34 m (112 ft)

Population (2011)
  - Total: 8,862
  - Density: 191.9/km^{2} (496.9/sq mi)
- Time zone: UTC+00:00 (WET)
  - Summer (DST): UTC+01:00 (WEST)
- Postal code: 9360-219
- Area code: 291
- Website: cm-pontadosol.pt

Ponta do Sol (Portuguese pronunciation: [ˈpõtɐ ðu ˈsɔl]; English: "Cape of the Sun") is a municipality in the southwestern coast of the island of Madeira, in the archipelago of Madeira. The population in 2011 was 8,862, in an area of 46.19 km^{2} (17.83 sq mi).

== History ==
The settlement of Ponta do Sol began shortly after the discovery of the island of Madeira, around 1420.

== Geography ==
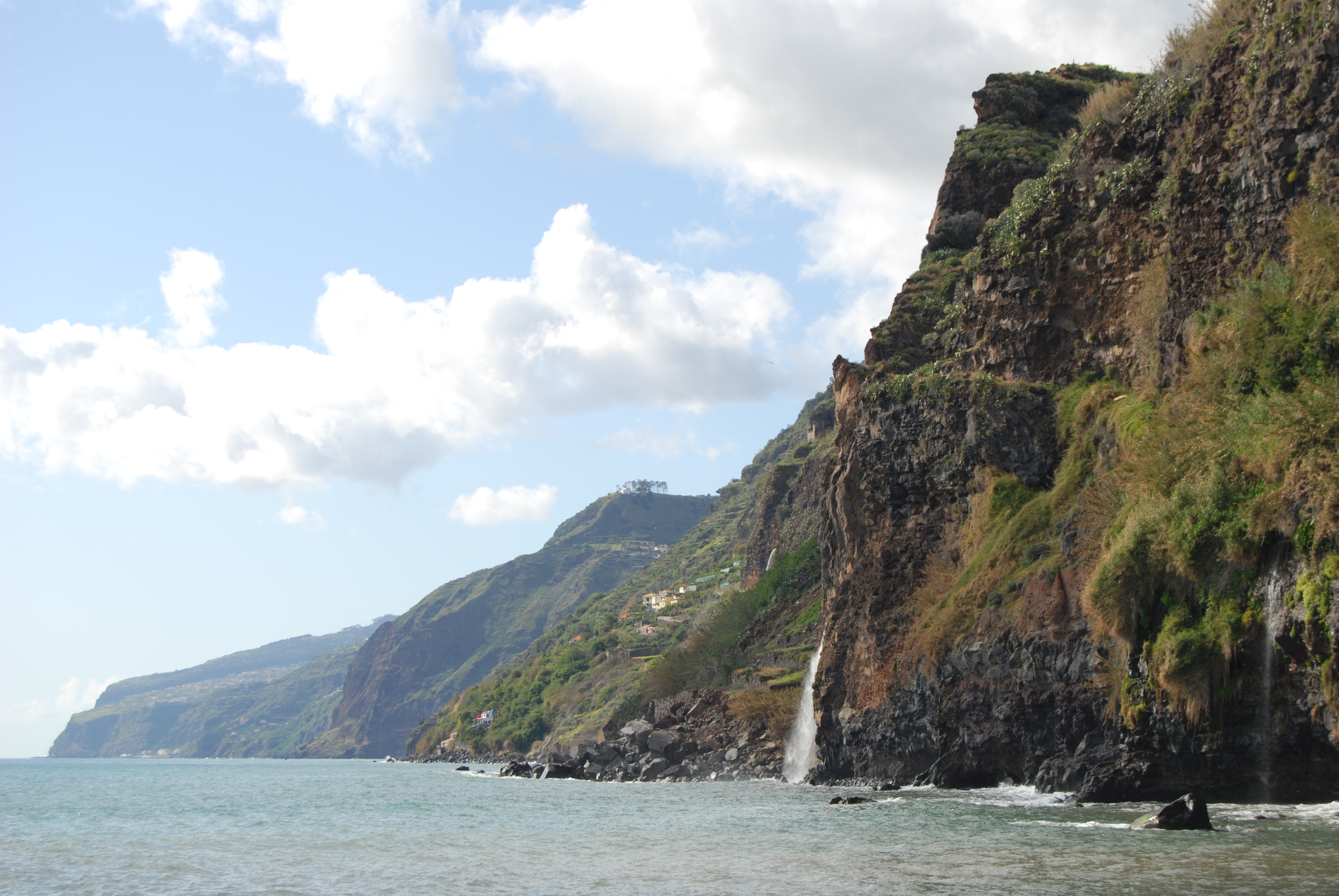
The rugged coastline near the parish of Ponta do Sol

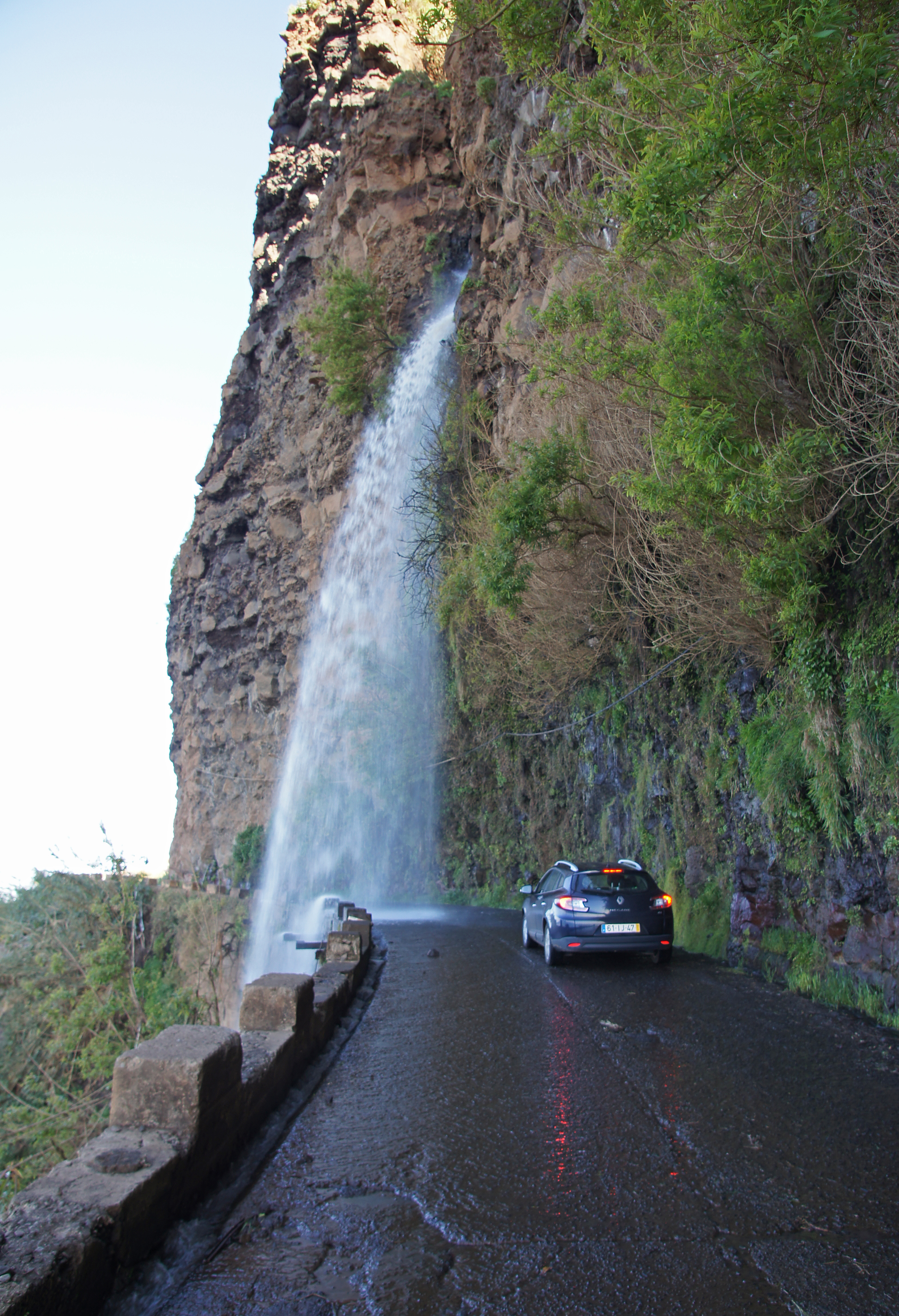
Cascata dos Anjos Waterfall on old road in Anjos, Ponta do Sol

Ponta do Sol is located between Ribeira-Brava and Calheta, on the southwest coast of Madeira, linked to Funchal (the capital) and surrounding communities by the main regional road.

The municipality is crossed by a few pedestrian hiking trails, that usually follow the levadas (English: aqueducts) carrying water from the mountains.

=== Human geography ===
Administratively, the municipal government is located in the civil parish (freguesia) of Ponta do Sol, while local government is handled through the three civil parishes:

- Canhas
- Madalena do Mar
- Ponta do Sol - in 2011, the parish had a population of 4,577 inhabitants, in an area of 27.45 km^{2} (10.60 sq mi)

In the mid-twentieth century, many residents of Ponta do Sol and the surrounding communities on Madeira immigrated to the Netherlands Antilles, especially the island of Curacao. This migration pattern began as both a reaction to the difficult economic conditions faced by many local residents of Ponta do Sol at the time and a response to the development of a Shell oil refinery on Curacao, which attracted immigrants from different parts of the Americas and further afield, including Portugal. While migrants from other areas of Portugal did move to the Netherlands Antilles as well, Madeirans made up the overwhelming majority of the broader group of Portuguese migrants to this island group in the Caribbean in the mid-twentieth century. Many descendants of immigrants from Madeira and Ponta do Sol in particular continue to live on Curacao today.

== Economy ==
Historically, the main sources of income in this region has been agriculture, fishing and trade. Ponta do Sol's main harbour, although small, was a crucial commercial gateway to the western part of the island. These importation and exportation businesses fostered the creation of new activities in what became the central part of the community and created a flow of goods into the hinterland (such as local and imported goods).

Today, commercial activity is scattered throughout the municipality, while the port area of Ponta do Sol has declined in importance. In its place, the economy of the municipality has been dispersed to other parishes, particularly Canhas, which were essentially agricultural parishes, but have developed into important economic nodes, while still retaining its rural landscape. While agriculture remains the primary activity in the interior, and the fisheries industry has declined significantly, construction and industrial enterprises have conquered a prominent role in the municipality. The service industry, particularly tourism, has carved-out a portion of the income stream, with high-quality hotels or residential inns located in the countryside and urban centres.
