= Canhas =

- Civil parish
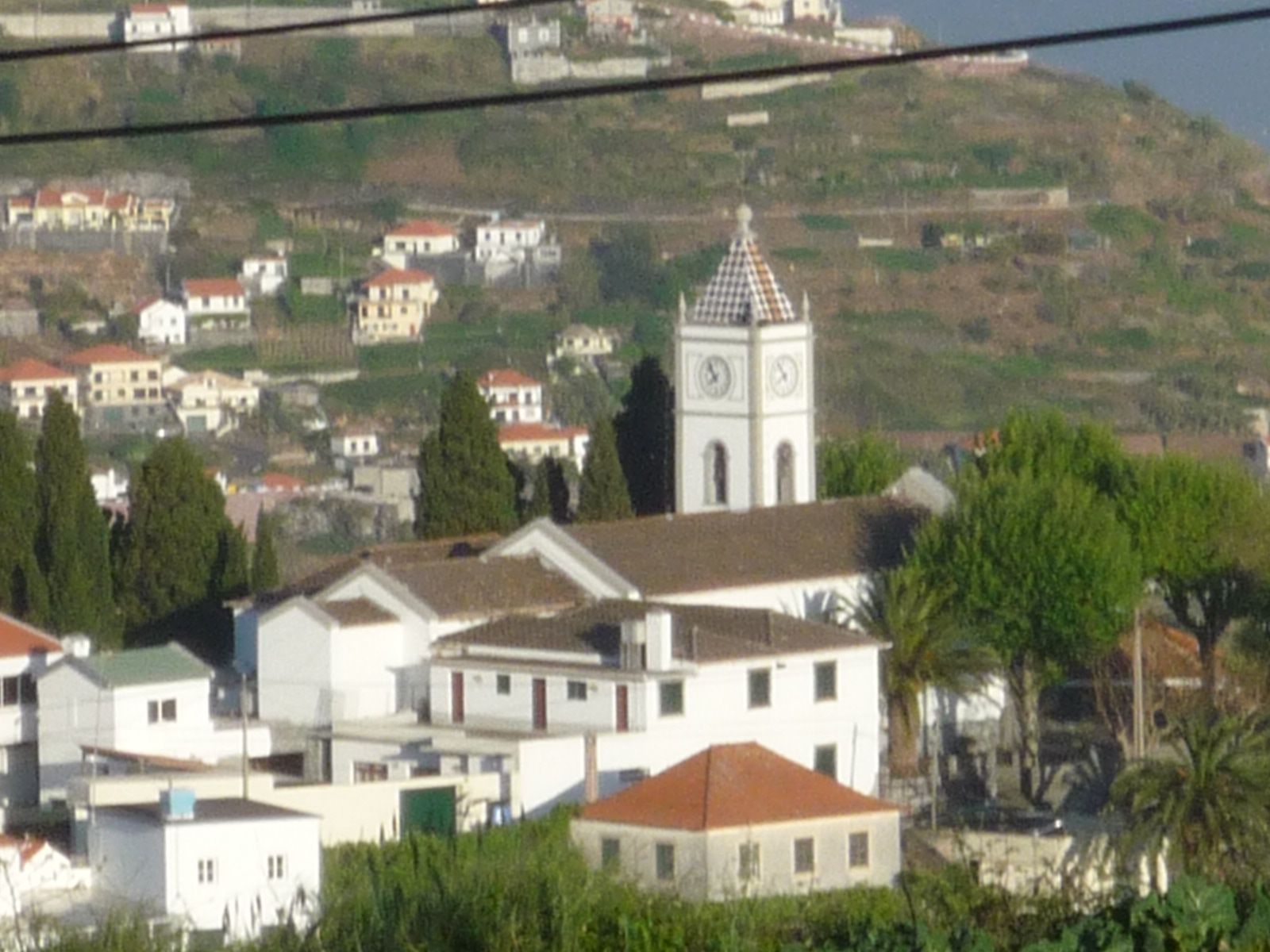
- The parish church of Nossa Senhora da Piedade

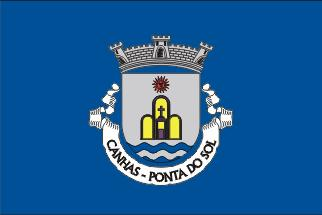
- Flag

- Location in Madeira
- Coordinates: 32°43′36″N 17°6′34″W
- Country: Portugal
- Auton. region: Madeira
- Island: Madeira
- Municipality: Ponta do Sol
- Established: Settlement: fl.1550 Parish: 10 July 1578

Area
  - Total: 16.66 km^{2} (6.43 sq mi)
- Elevation: 985 m (3,232 ft)

Population (2011)
  - Total: 3,769
  - Density: 226.2/km^{2} (585.9/sq mi)
- Time zone: UTC+00:00 (WET)
  - Summer (DST): UTC+01:00 (WEST)
- Postal code: 9360-00
- Area code: 291
- Patron: Nossa Senhora das Dores

Canhas is a civil parish in the municipality of Ponta do Sol in the Portuguese archipelago of Madeira. Extending into the interior from the coast, the parish has an area of 16.66 km^{2}. It has a population of 3,769 (2011).

== Economy ==
A once essentially agricultural parish, Canhas has gradually been converted into an important economic centre, while retaining its rural feel. Even though agriculture is still a prime industry, civil construction and related industries have conquered a prominent position in the parish.
