= Battle of the Ialomița =

1442 battle between the Kingdom of Hungary and Ottoman Empire

- Part of the Hungarian–Ottoman Wars
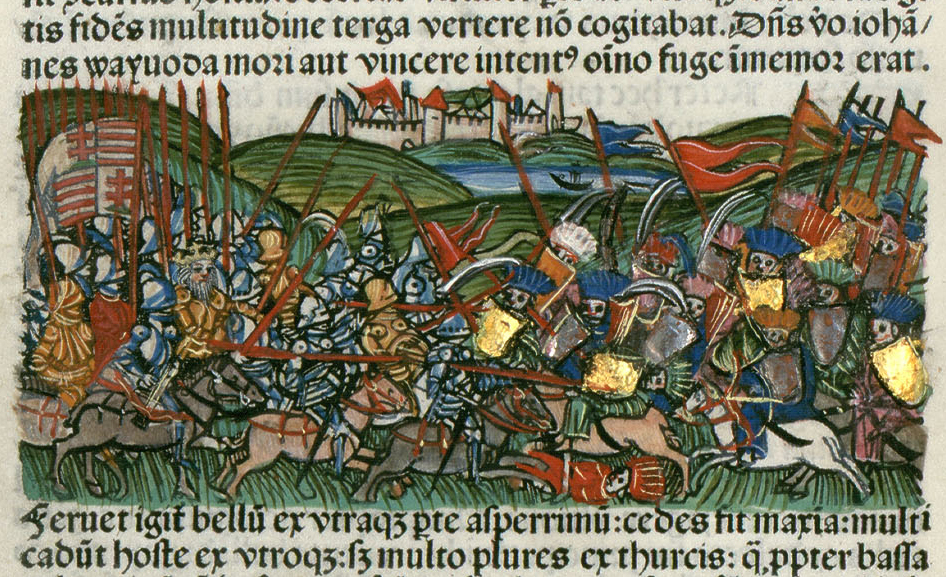
- The battle of John Hunyadi against Şehabeddin Pasha (at the Iron Gate in the chronicle) (Chronica Hungarorum, 1488)
Date	July 1442; 2 September 1442; 6 September 1442
Location	The exact place is a matter of debate among historians: Iron Gate Pass of Transylvania, Zajkány, Kingdom of Hungary (now Zeicani, Romania) (by older historiography); Ialomița River in Wallachia (now Romania) (by modern historiography); Lower Danube (near now Călărași, Romania)
Result	Hungarian victory

Belligerents
Kingdom of Hungary	Ottoman Empire

Commanders and leaders
John Hunyadi	(Ottoman Empire) Şehabeddin Pasha

Strength
15,000	80,000 (older sources); 70,000; 30,000; 16 sanjak beys, 15,000 akinji, more than half of the entire regular cavalry force of the Ottoman Empire, 2,000–4,000 janissaries

Casualties and losses
Heavy casualties	Heavy casualties, about half the army All 16 sanjak beys were killed, representing around half of the sanjak beys in the empire (some Ottoman sources); 28,000 (chronicle from Messembria)

The Battle of the Ialomița was fought in early September 1442 between the army of the Kingdom of Hungary and the Ottoman Empire. The Hungarian army, led by John Hunyadi, defeated the forces of Şehabeddin Pasha, the Provincial Governor of Rumelia, in the upper valley of the Ialomița River, located south of the Carpathian Mountains in Wallachia. Şehabeddin, overconfident and seeking to avenge Mezid Bey's defeat at the Battle of Iron Gate, instead suffered an even more disastrous defeat. Well-equipped heavy cavalry and the use of Hussite wagon fort played a crucial role in the Hungarian victory.

The Ottoman advance against Hungary, which began in 1438, was halted at the Siege of Belgrade in 1440, which castle was regarded as the southern gate of the Hungarian Kingdom. While Turkish raids into the Kingdom of Hungary continued intermittently over the following years, up until the crushing defeats of Ottomans in several battles in 1442. In the year of 1442, John Hunyadi won four victories against the Ottomans, two of which were decisive. This reversed the dominance of the war party at the Ottoman court in Edirne, particularly when its most ardent supporter, Şehabeddin Pasha himself was defeated, he was called as "vice-emperor" in some contemporary Christian sources.

After the battle, the name of Hunyadi became famous and generally respected in the Christian world and became feared by the entire Ottoman Empire. This was the first time a European army had defeated such a large Ottoman force, composed not only of raiders but also of provincial cavalry led by their own sanjak beys and accompanied by the elite, formidable janissaries. The victories over Mezid Bey and then over Şehabeddin brought Hunyadi international fame and undermined the growing belief in Ottoman invincibility.

The victory of John Hunyadi against Şehabeddin Pasha and a large Ottoman army was his greatest battlefield victory, and his second greatest military accomplishment after the defense battle during the Siege of Belgrade in 1456.

Hunyadi's victories in 1442 were a primary motivation for the successful Hungarian anti-Ottoman crusade of the winter of 1443–1444, known as the Long Campaign.

== Disputed locations of the 1442 battles ==
=== Battle between John Hunyadi and Mezid Bey ===
The battle between John Hunyadi and Mezid Bey, fought within the Kingdom of Hungary: Older historiography places it at Szeben in Transylvania, while modern historiography locates the battle at the Iron Gate Pass (Vaskapu in Hungarian) in Hunyad county, southwestern Transylvania.

=== Battle between John Hunyadi and Şehabeddin Pasha ===
The battle between John Hunyadi and Şehabeddin Pasha: Older historiography places it at the Transylvanian Iron Gate Pass (Vaskapu) within Kingdom of Hungary, while modern historiography locates the battle in the upper valley of the Ialomița River, located south of the Carpathian Mountains in Wallachia, near Târgoviște. The exact location is still a matter of much debate among historians. The American historian John Jefferson has suggested a battlefield along the Danube near the modern town of Călărași in southern Romania.

== Background ==
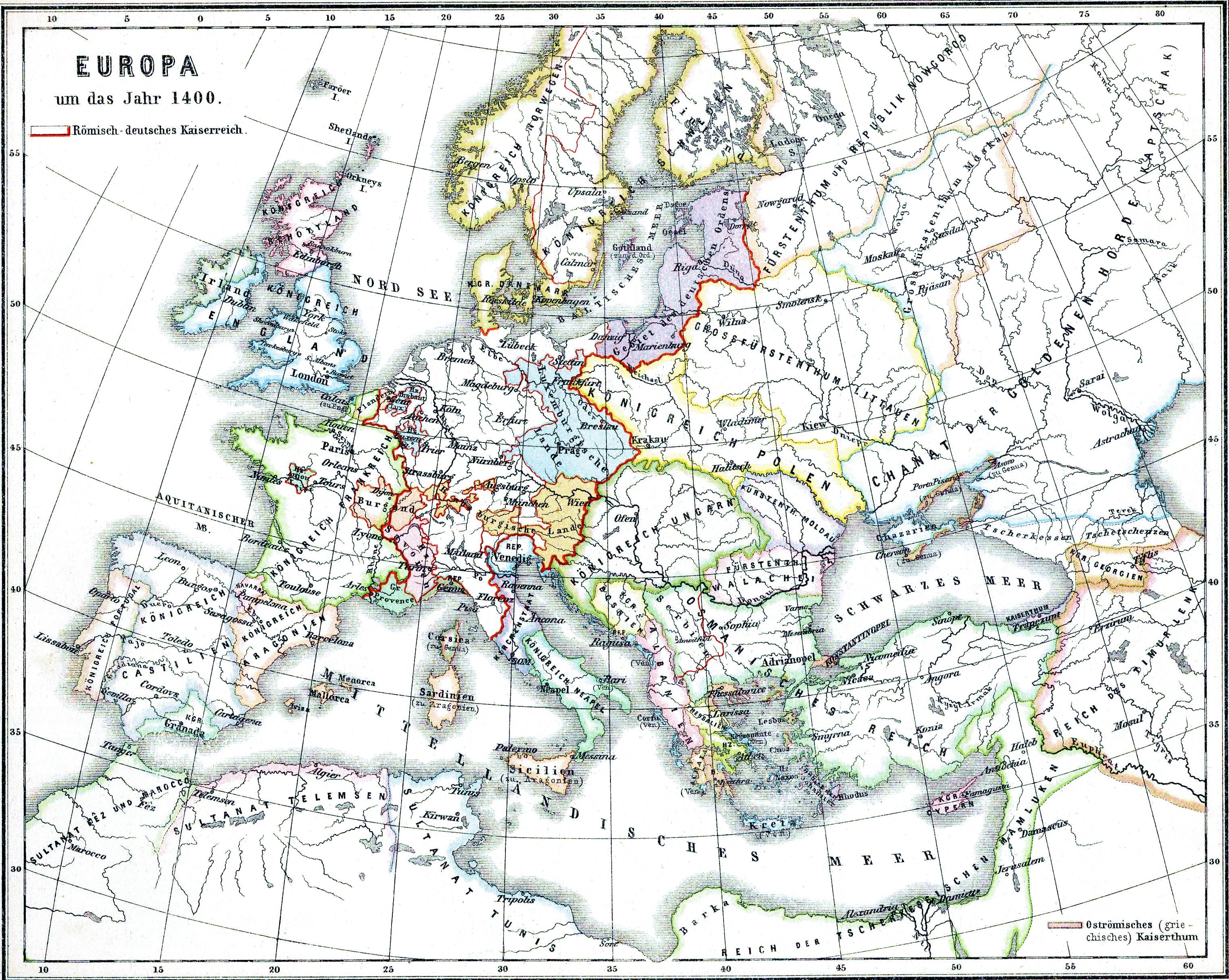
Europe in 1400

King Sigismund of Hungary (reigned 1387–1437) pursued an effective, decades-long, fundamentally defensive policy in the Hungarian–Ottoman Wars. Following the defeat at the Battle of Nicopolis in 1396, King Sigismund developed a new defense strategy. He aimed to create a buffer zone along the border between the Kingdom of Hungary and the Ottoman Empire, and also strengthened the existing system of banates on the southern border, which was closely linked to the developing system of border fortresses.

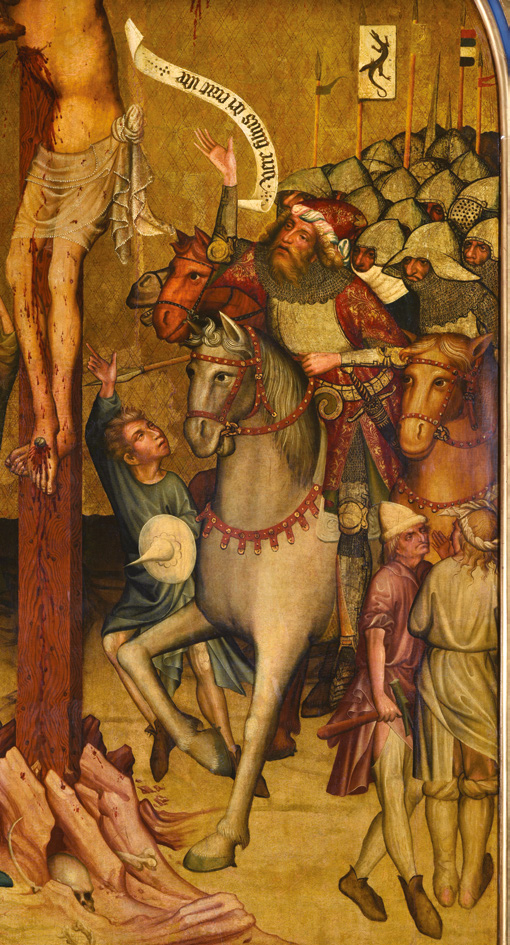
Calvary altar with the representation of King Sigismund of Hungary (Garamszentbenedek, Kingdom of Hungary, 1427)

King Sigismund ordered Franko Tallóci, John Ország, and John Marczaly to lead a contingent of Hungarian, Polish, and Czech soldiers in a raid against Turkish territory in the summer of 1437. Ali Bey, the marcher lord of Vidin, assembled an Ottoman force to pursue and attack the Hungarian raiders. Due in part to the valiant and decisive actions of Franko Tallóci, the Ottoman force was routed, and the Hungarians pursued the retreating Ottomans, inflicting casualties where possible. The Raid on Kruševac was the largest and most successful Hungarian incursion in many years. It penetrated more than 100 kilometers into enemy territory, inflicted multiple defeats, and crippled the Ottoman river fleet. The raid had two significant consequences. First, it marked the first major offensive undertaken by the Hungarians in years, demonstrating the potential effectiveness of such operations. Second, it provoked the anger of the sultan at a time when other factors were already pushing the Ottomans toward the annexation of Serbia and the conquest of Hungary. The raid on Kruševac was the first of several Hungarian military campaigns aimed at disrupting Ottoman raiding networks in the Balkans, later undertaken as crusading expeditions and offensive anti-Ottoman campaigns organized by Hunyadi. Although these deep incursions into Ottoman territory were widely celebrated, they did not provide effective protection for the southern frontiers of the Kingdom of Hungary. Despite widespread destruction in Serbia, Bulgaria, and Bosnia, Ottoman power structures remained largely unaffected, as the affected areas could be quickly repopulated with settlers from other parts of the empire. The loss of naval infrastructure and artillery likewise did not hinder the empire's continuous raidings of its neighbours, as evidenced by the campaigns of 1438–1439. In late summer 1437, Sigismund ordered a general mobilization under the command of Palatine Lawrence Hédervári, citing Murad's determination to personally avenge the previous defeat. The Hungarian raid on Kruševac played a key role in provoking the major Ottoman campaign into Transylvania in 1438.

In late 1437, after the death of King Sigismund, Sultan Murad II addressed his court:

Who from among my subjects knows the roads of Hungary?...My Sultan! Hungary is a most glorious kingdom and befits you. Is it not shameful that an infidel should be lord of this kingdom?

— Aşıkpaşazâde

The Ottomans became aware of the Transylvanian peasant revolt in 1437, a fact which made the region an even more attractive target for the large-scale expedition of the following year. Ali Bey, possibly driven by a desire for revenge after his defeat near Smederevo that summer, launched a raid into Transylvania during the winter of 1437–1438, aiming to gather intelligence about the region.

Murad exploited the change of rulers in Hungary and launched a surprise attack against Hungary and Serbia. In 1438, Sultan Murad II personally led the largest raid on Hungary in living memory. However, Murad's presence is disputed. The campaign aimed to lay the groundwork for the conquest of Serbia the following year, Ali Bey was dispatched to carry out a diversionary attack against Transylvania. According to Pálosfalvi, within the context of the Hungarian–Ottoman wars, it would be exceptional for a campaign led by the sultan to consist primarily of plundering. In the autumn, the Ottoman army advanced into Transylvania through the Iron Gate. Voivode of Wallachia, Vlad II Dracul with his troops participated in the Ottoman expedition. The raid caused destruction on a scale not previously seen, suburbs of several Saxon towns were burnt, the Székely regions were devastated. The Ottomans devastated Segesvár, Medgyes (now Sighișoara, Mediaș, Romania) and burned the suburbs of Brassó (now Brașov, Romania). The Ottoman invasion ravaged southeastern Hungary for 45 days, during which the Ottomans faced little resistance, except at Szeben (now Sibiu, Romania), where the resistance of citizens caused significant Ottoman casualties, the capture of the fortified city was failed during a week-long siege. The Ottoman raid was so effective because King Albert of Hungary was in Bohemia with a significant number of Hungarian troops, and some Hungarian forces were also assisting the Serbian Despot George Branković.

In the summer of 1439, Sultan Murad II led a campaign to conquer Serbia, the southern Hungarian territories of Temesvár (now Timișoara, Romania) and Szörény (now Severin, Romania) also identified as potential targets. A general mobilization was ordered, and King Albert advanced to Titel in early September. By that time, Smederevo had already fallen to the Ottomans. The king, accompanied by the high nobility, committed himself to raising a fully paid army for a renewed campaign the following spring. However, the king died of dysentery while returning to Vienna. King Albert left no male heir, but was survived by his pregnant wife, Elizabeth of Luxembourg, daughter of King Sigismund. After Albert's death, urgent Ottoman pressure led a group of Hungarian barons to invite the Polish king Władysław III (Vladislaus I in Hungary) to take the Hungarian throne rather than wait for that child to be born to the pregnant Elizabeth. The decision followed historical precedent, as Hungary and Poland – the two most powerful East-Central European countries – had shared a ruler under King Louis I, and a renewed union promised stronger, more effective resistance against the Ottomans through combined resources and armies. Between the supporters of Elizabeth and Vladislaus, a Hungarian civil war was triggered by the coronation of the infant Ladislaus V at Székesfehérvár on 15 May 1440, just one week before Vladislaus entered Buda. The most threatening consequence of the Hungarian internal conflict was an Ottoman intervention, which manifested in the siege of Belgrade in early summer 1440.

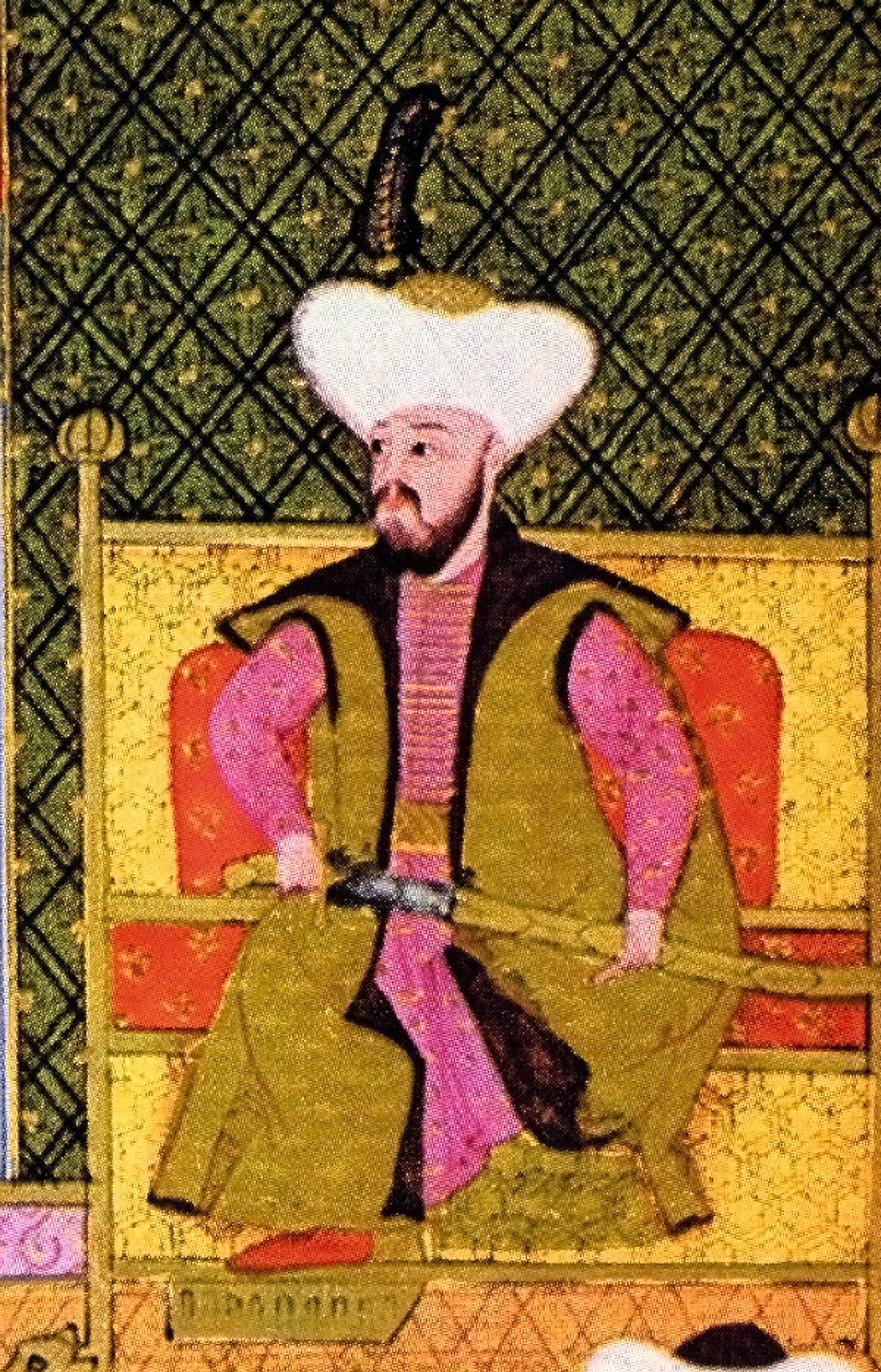
Ottoman miniature of Sultan Murad II (Hünername, 1584–1588)

Between 1438 and 1440, the Ottoman Empire pursued a comprehensive strategy aimed at expanding its influence and territorial control in the Balkans and Central Europe. This approach involved the annexation and incorporation of buffer states such as Serbia, followed by efforts to bring Wallachia under direct Ottoman control. Simultaneously, the Ottomans launched repeated raids into Transylvania and other regions of the Kingdom of Hungary. These incursions were intended not only to weaken Hungarian resistance but also to divert Hungarian resources and attention, thereby preventing effective support for Serbia or Wallachia. A central objective of this strategy was the capture of key fortresses, particularly Nándorfehérvár (now Belgrade, Serbia), which could serve as a strategic base for further operations into Hungarian territory and assist in overcoming the natural defensive barrier posed by the Danube River. Following the anticipated seizure of Belgrade, the Ottomans planned to initiate a broader campaign aimed at the conquest of Hungary, with the ultimate goal of annexing at least a portion of the Hungarian Kingdom into the Ottoman realm.

Between 1438 and 1440, the Kingdom of Hungary experienced the most intense period of Ottoman raids in its history, both in terms of size and frequency. In the winter of 1439 to 1440 alone, two large raids were carried out against the kingdom. In just one of these, 7,000 prisoners were seized. According to Brother George, a native of Transylvania who later recorded his experiences after more than 20 years of Ottoman captivity, more than 70,000 people were taken into slavery. According to Petrus de Alla, a Franciscan monk who resided in Edirne as chaplain to the local Italian merchant community, approximately 160,000 Christians had been enslaved since early 1438.

[Between June 1439 and May 1440] The mujahedeen crossed the river into the kingdom of Hungary five times in boats. They raided, sated themselves with ample plunder, smashed their idols and their crosses, ravaged their homes and palaces, scorched their countryside and villas, suppressed their images and engravings, and reduced their castles stone by stone as they fell upon their heads.

— Murad sultan to the Mameluke king

The Janissary Corps were a formidable elite infantry units that formed the Ottoman sultan's household troops, they were the first modern standing army, and perhaps the first infantry force in the world to be equipped with firearms, adopted during the reign of Murad II. The Slaves of the Porte (janissaries) comprised the disciplined core of the sultan's army and they fought in most of the major campaigns from 1440 to 1444. The slave system during this period is considered one of the key factors contributing to Ottoman-Hungarian hostilities. In addition to economic incentives, military objectives were also a driving force. Ottoman territorial expansion required a continuous supply of soldiers, which in turn necessitated the recruitment of new manpower. Raids and invasions carried out between 1437 and 1441 all resulted in the seizure of massive numbers of slaves, many of which eventually became Slaves of the Porte (janissaries). Although the process of indoctrination and training of these captives took years, these campaigns simultaneously weakened the Kingdom of Hungary and strengthened the Ottoman military. Contemporary Ottoman and Christian sources indicate that especially high numbers of captives were taken during the campaigns of 1438–1439. In Transylvania in 1455 there were still many cities and towns that were abandoned and had not yet recovered from the raids of 1438–1439.

As the "key to the realm", the castle of Nándorfehérvár (now Belgrade, Serbia) was the biggest and most fortified border stronghold of Hungary, regarded as the southern gate of the Hungarian Kingdom. The sultan took advantage of the Hungarian civil war, the Ottomans under Sultan Murad II laid siege to Belgrade in 1440, the most important Hungarian border fortress in the south, but they had to lift the siege after seven months due to the stiff resistance of the Hungarian garrison and the approaching winter season. At the same time Ottoman expeditions raided Hungary, including Transylvania, and as far as the Tisza River and devastating the countryside. This situation, combined with an ongoing civil war over the Hungarian royal succession, suggests that an Ottoman victory in 1440 could very likely have led to the collapse of the kingdom shortly thereafter. Despite this, many Hungarian nobles remained more concerned with the outcome of the internal conflict than with the threat posed by the Ottomans.

The Ottoman advance that began in 1438 was halted at the Siege of Belgrade in 1440, the last offensive campaign against Hungary personally led by Sultan Murad II. A second attempt to capture Belgrade was not undertaken until 1456, well after the Fall of Constantinople in 1453. Following the failed siege, Murad appears to have abandoned the idea of conquering Hungary through a direct assault on Belgrade. Instead, he redirected his focus toward Wallachia and Transylvania. His broader strategy was to use these lands as a springboard to conquer Hungary from the east, thereby bypassing Belgrade altogether.

=== John Hunyadi ===
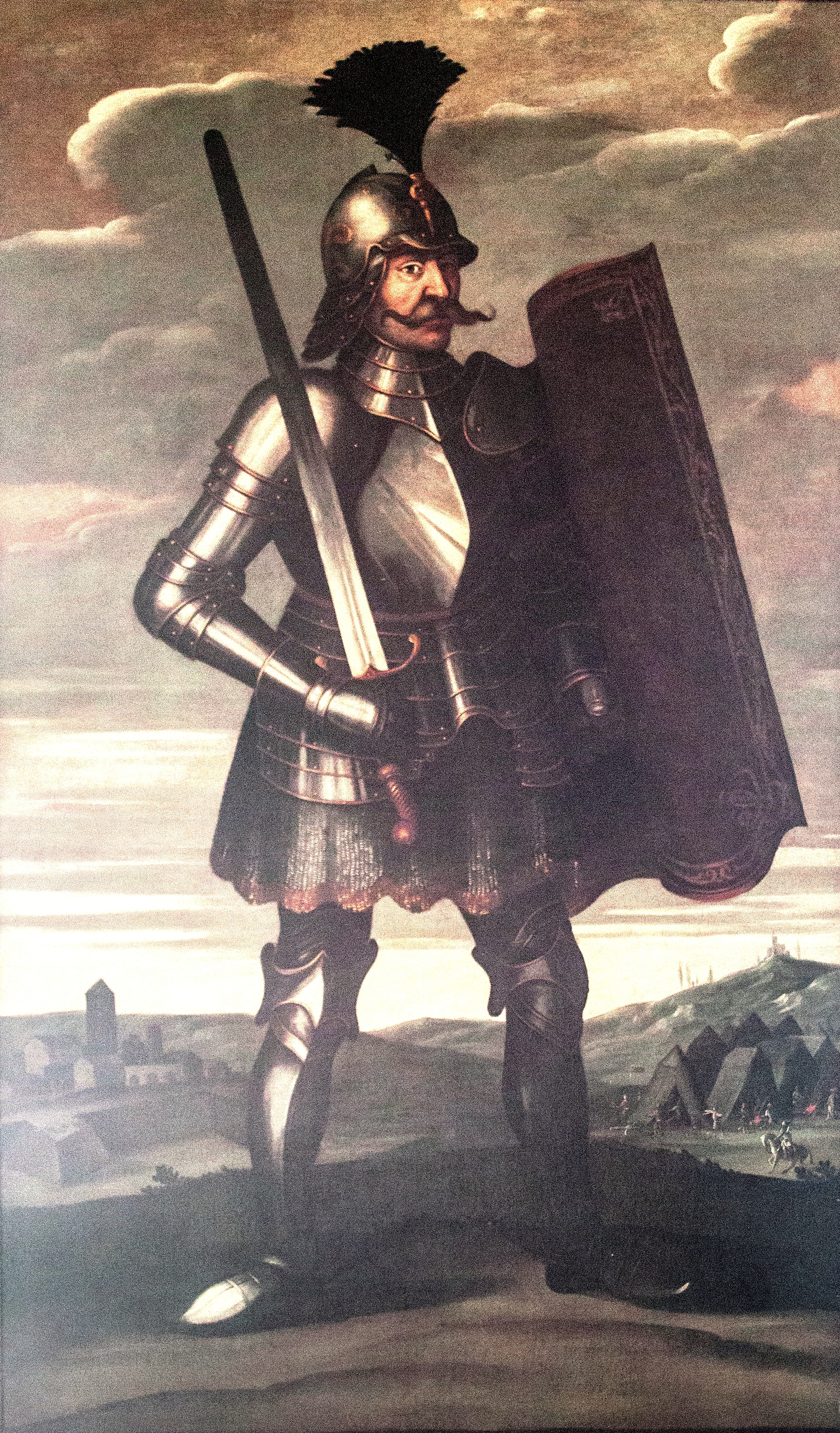
John Hunyadi, general of the army of the Kingdom of Hungary, Voivode of Transylvania and the Count of the Székelys in 1442 (17th century depiction)

The events of 1438–1440 played a decisive role in reshaping Hungarian strategy toward the Ottoman Empire. One of the richest magnates in Hungary, Nicholas Újlaki was appointed Ban of Macsó in 1438, while John Hunyadi (knight in the court of King Sigismund) was appointed Ban of Szörény in 1439 by King Albert. In January 1441, Hunyadi, together with Újlaki, defeated the forces of the opponents of King Vladislaus I at Bátaszék. Their victory effectively put an end to the Hungarian civil war. The grateful king jointly appointed Hunyadi and Újlaki as Voivodes of Transylvania, Counts of the Székelys, Ispáns of Temes County, and Captains of Belgrade, entrusting them with the defense of the southern marches. In practice, Hunyadi led, while Újlaki mainly delegated authority and supplied troops when needed. Hunyadi brought a decisive change to the Hungarian government's approach to the Ottoman threat. John Hunyadi immediately advocated for an offensive, anti-Ottoman strategy after taking control of the southern frontiers. He began preparing for an offensive war aimed at gradually shifting military operations into Ottoman territory. As Hunyadi wrote to the Pope before the Battle of Kosovo in 1448, his principal goal was, if possible with international assistance, to defeat the Ottomans in a decisive battle, continue the war on Ottoman territory until its final conclusion, and expel the Ottomans from Europe. This marked a decisive shift away from the essentially defensive strategy adopted by King Sigismund after 1397 and signalled a revival of the crusading ideal, as political conditions in Europe had become more favourable, developments within the Church encouraged renewed crusading efforts, and Ottoman pressure had become increasingly intolerable.

They are exceedingly strong both in material resources and in numbers, and it is with them that we must measure our arms, and I fear that the war we have begun against the Turks will have to be waged against the whole of Asia... We shall bring it to an end only if we remain at the heels of the defeated enemy, and if we do not relent until the expulsion of the enemy from Europe has fulfilled our hopes... At present, Your Blessedness commands an army that can match them in pay, and commands soldiers who burn with the desire to avenge the grief inflicted upon their homes, who stand not in temporary, but in permanent arms against our eternal enemies, who will never be reconciled with the Christian name. Let only support not be withheld, so that, having achieved our goal, a liberated Europe, its faith restored, may proclaim the glory and splendor of the Holy See.

— A letter issued by John Vitéz, in the name of John Hunyadi, Governor of Hungary, to Pope Nicholas V (17 September 1448)

In 1441, as reaction to the Ottoman occupation of Novo Brdo in southern Serbia, Hunyadi began to make raids on the Ottoman countryside in Serbia, the operation of Hunyadi aimed to devastate the area in the same manner as Turkish raiders typically did. Hunyadi was on his way back to Belgrade when his path was blocked by the troops of Ishak Bey, the commander of Smederovo. By the Battle of Smederevo he defeated Ishak Bey. Hunyadi pursued Ishak Bey and his men all the way to the gates of Smederovo, killing and capturing as many of the enemy as possible along the way.

=== The battle between John Hunyadi and Mezid Bey ===
Anti-Ottoman campaigns of John Hunyadi, 1440–1456

The sultan was upset by the defeat of Ishak Bey and ordered a massive invasion against Hungary in the next sprint. The Hungarian court was informed about the planned Ottoman invasion of March in 1442. Hunyadi had the responsibility for the defense of the southern frontiers. The Ottomans were always well informed about the internal situation of Hungary. Hunyadi's co-voivode, Nicholas Újlaki, was in Pozsony (now Bratislava, Slovakia) with the Hungarian king, who was conducting major military operations in north-western Hungary with most of the available armed forces. Before the anticipated Ottoman attack, Hunyadi mobilized the forces of the entire southeastern defensive section. The Ottoman offensive was more than a plundering raid, simultaneous attacks were launched against Transylvania and Slavonia, and the forces were prepared for siege operations as well. The invading army marched as an undivided force for as long as possible to prevent the Hungarian forces from concentrating their troops. The army that advanced toward Slavonia was subsequently divided again. One detachment carried out a diversionary raid in the region between the Sava and Drava rivers, while the other accomplished the principal strategic objective of the campaign, the capture of Srebrenik Castle in northern Bosnia. The Transylvanian invasion took place in early spring 1442 and involved 16,000 akinji cavalry raiders under the command of the experienced marcher lord Mezid Bey. The forces of Mezid Bey pillaged southern and central Transylvania in March 1442. They defeated the army of John Hunyadi and Bishop György Lépes in a battle on 18 March. But the Ottoman army was ultimately defeated by John Hunyadi in a decisive battle on 22 March at the Iron Gate Pass (Vaskapu in Hungarian) in southwestern Transylvania. The Ottoman losses were heavy, Hunyadi recovered the stolen loot. The Marcher Lord of Nicopolis, Mezid Bey died, along with his son and the majority of his men. According to older historiography, John Hunyadi defeated Mezid Bey and the raiding Ottoman army at Szeben (now Sibiu, Romania) in the south part of the Kingdom of Hungary in Transylvania.

Hunyadi was encamped with his troops around Temesvár (now Timișoara, Romania), prepared to intervene wherever his presence might be required. His late arrival in Transylvania, and the consequent defeat of the local army, which resulted in the death of the Bishop of Transylvania, was explained by the fact that the Ottomans had also launched an attack on Slavonia, compelling Hunyadi to wait until the second Ottoman army had moved westward.

According to the viewpoint of classic historiography, Transylvania was caught by surprise by the Ottoman attack. Voivode John Hunyadi had only recently arrived in the region before the raid and, together with the bishop of Transylvania, György Lépes, hastily gathered an army and charged at the Turks. However, they were defeated near Gyulafehérvár (now Alba Iulia, Romania), the bishop was killed on the battlefield, and Hunyadi was wounded. However, Hunyadi, without hesitation, called the people of the province to arms – nobles, Székelys, and peasants alike – and just five days later, he delivered a decisive defeat to the Turkish army. However, according to Hungarian historian Tamás Pálosfalvi, Hunyadi was not present at this first battle, which took place in Marosszentimre (now Sântimbru, Romania). The Thuróczy chronicle preserved the information that Hunyadi arrived in Transylvania only directly before the first battle. The credibility of this information is reinforced by the fact that, according to a charter issued by King Vladislaus I of Hungary, the first clash occurred unexpectedly. According to Pálosfalvi, the battle could not have been unforeseen if Hunyadi had already been in Transylvania awaiting the Turkish attack. The wounded Hunyadi likely had little opportunity, in just four days, to meaningfully replenish his battle-weary army and launch a surprise attack on the retreating Turks, who were undoubtedly made more cautious by their own losses. Also, in just four days, no meaningful mobilization could have been carried out, let alone catching up with the retreating Turkish army.

According to Pálosfalvi, the location of Hunyadi's subsequent victory over the retreating Mezid Bey was the Vaskapu (Iron Gate) in Hunyad County, the location of the victorious battle has already been convincingly identified by Ottokár Székely near the Iron Gate in southwestern Transylvania. This identification is supported by a letter written by Hunyadi himself a few years later, under similar circumstances. This conclusion is supported by numerous contemporary documents, however, according to Pálosfalvi, unfortunately, some authors continue to rely on the incorrect claims of earlier historiography.

A wagon heavily laden with booty, said to require ten horses to draw it, was dispatched to the Serbian Despot George Branković, an ally of Hungary. The wagon was topped with the impaled heads of Mezid Bey and his son and was accompanied by an elderly Turk who was forced to present the trophy.

Hunyadi pursued the Ottomans beyond Hungary's borders, and the Hungarian army penetrated into Wallachia. The lightning campaign of Hunyadi aimed to punish the Wallachian voivode, who was accused of cooperating with the Turks in their raid on Transylvania. Hunyadi deposed the pro-Ottoman voivode and ordered his execution, before restoring Basarab II to power. With Hungarian influence reestablished in Wallachia, it was now reasonable to expect that the Ottomans would face greater difficulty reaching Transylvania from that direction than they had in March 1442.

By defeating Mezid Bey and launching a raid into Wallachia, Hunyadi clearly signaled that, despite the ongoing civil war in Hungary, any aggressors could expect strong resistance. However, the repeated plundering of Transylvania undoubtedly convinced him that the theater of war needed to be pushed as far from Hungary's borders as possible. This was the campaign's immediate lesson in the context of Hunyadi's anti-Ottoman strategy. As earlier examples demonstrate, the defeat of Mezid Bey and the Hungarian intervention in Wallachia made an Ottoman response to be expected.

News of the dramatic defeat of Mezid Bey caused upheaval in the Ottoman court. Hunyadi's victory had also resulted in the loss of Ottoman suzerainty over Wallachia. Just as the Hungarian raid on Kruševac had provoked a large-scale Ottoman invasion of Transylvania in 1438, so Hunyadi's incursion into Ottoman territory had to be answered in kind. The defeat of Mezid Bey in Transylvania and the surrender of the Wallachian voivode incited Sultan Murad II for revenge, he decided a general, large-scale retaliatory campaign against the Kingdom of Hungary for the following year, which he personally intended to lead. In order to immediately avenge the defection of the Wallachian voivode and the defeat of Mezid Bey, the sultan entrusted one of his famous lieutenant, Şehabeddin, who offered himself voluntarily for this task with great confidence, to punish Wallachia and Transylvania, telling him "not to dare to return before the conquest of the two territory". During these years, Şehabeddin ranked second in influence at the Ottoman court, surpassed only by Halil Pasha, who remained firmly entrenched in his position as Grand Vizier. Şehabeddin held not only the title of Vizier but also served as Beylerbey of Rumelia. He sought to use the authority of this key military post to maintain and advance the momentum of Ottoman expansion.

When, therefore, Murad, the emperor of the Turks, reflected upon the defeat suffered by his forces, the many dead among his people, and the secession from his authority of the lands and rulers of Moldavia and Wallachia, he dwelt upon these matters in his troubled mind and resolved to exact a harsh vengeance upon those who had attacked him. Accordingly, he gathered from among his people eighty thousand chosen warriors, men especially distinguished in martial prowess, and placed at their head a pasha who was second only to himself in matters of governance. He ordered him to invade the land of Wallachia without delay and to devastate it thoroughly, as punishment for the voivode's defection. From there, he was to lead his forces into the Transylvanian regions of the Kingdom of Hungary and, to the fullest extent of his power, exact a severe vengeance by fire and sword for the injuries inflicted upon him by Lord Voivode John.

— Johannes Thuróczy: Chronica Hungarorum

== Prelude ==
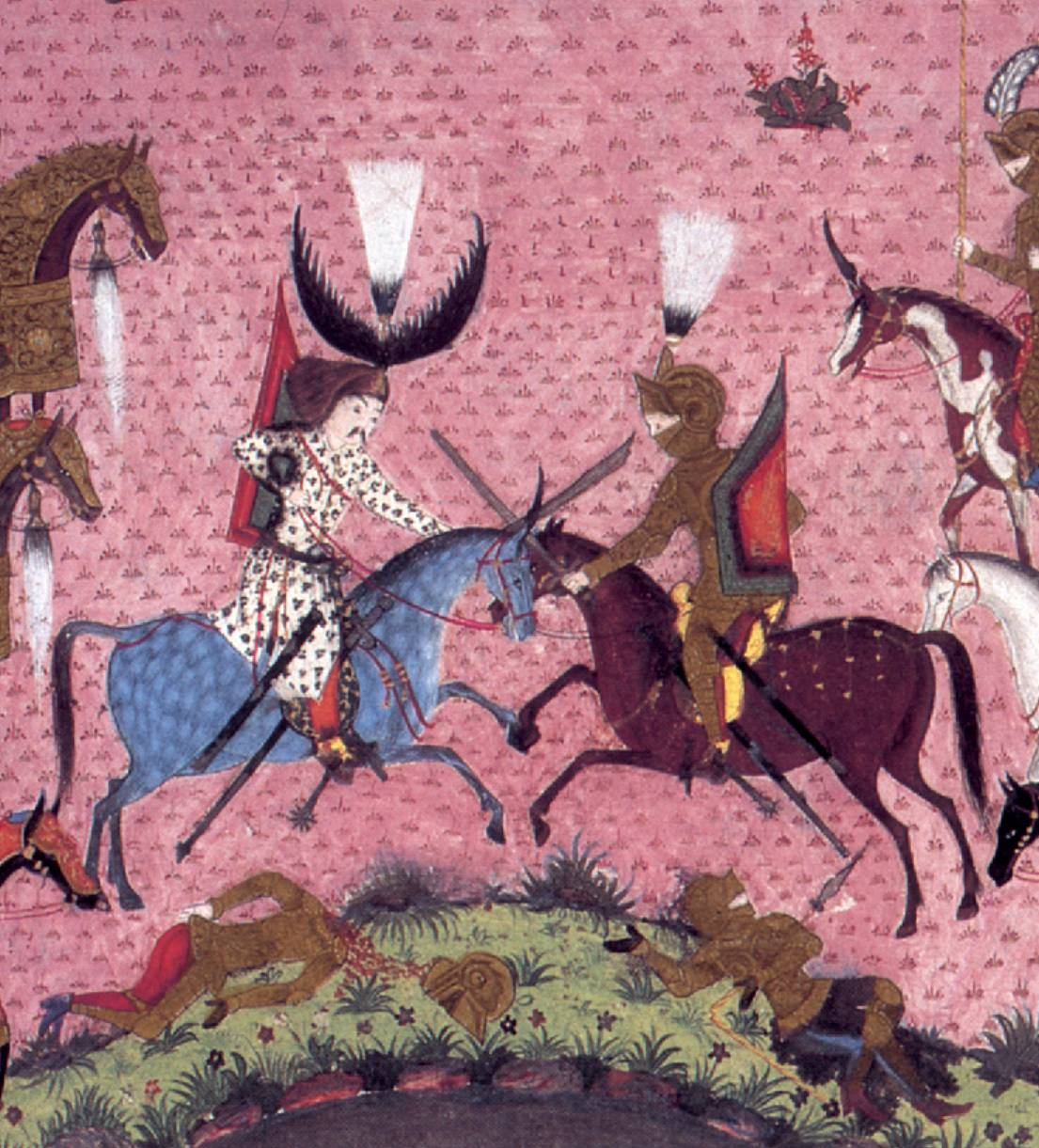
Akinji duels with a Hungarian knight (Suleymanname, 1558)

Şehabeddin vowed revenge and later advanced at the head of a large army, boasting that at the mere sight of his turban his adversaries would flee for hundreds of miles. The number of the Ottoman army was unanimously reported to be 80,000 according to the old writers, such as Thuróczy in the Chronica Hungarorum and Bonfini in the Rerum Hungaricarum Decades. According to Pálosfalvi, although Şehabeddin was able to muster regular troops and even janissaries alongside the irregular cavalry – likely a necessary response to the losses Mezid's army had suffered six months earlier – the extremely large figures reported in contemporary charters and subsequently repeated by later chroniclers are exaggerated. As Beylerbey of Rumelia (Provincial Governor of Rumelia) and Ottoman vizier, Şehabeddin was able to command significantly more military resources than Mezid Bey. Apart from the akinji, who numbered well over 10,000 cavalrymen, he gathered a total of 16 sanjak beys (governors), representing more than half of the Ottoman Empire's regular provincial cavalry and forming the core of his army. He also brought along between 2,000 and 4,000 janissaries. According to the contemporary Ottoman historian Oruç Bey, there were 2,000 janissaries, 15,000 akinji, and 16 sanjak beys. In the Annals of Murad II, there were 3,000 janissaries and 16 sanjak beys present. Contemporary Byzantine historian, Chalkokondyles writes that a total of 4,000 janissaries marched with Şehabeddin. According to Weiss, research based on the documented troop numbers of the Ottoman Empire, a reliable estimate places the total forces involved in the campaign between 20,000 and 40,000 combatants, with no more than 30,000 participating in the actual battle. This large army took several months to assemble, and Şehabeddin was unable to set out until the end of the summer of 1442.

Şehabeddin's principal goal must have been to reestablish Ottoman control over Wallachia. An Ottoman envoy was heading to the Hungarian royal court, while Şehabeddin penetrated Wallachia. Upon arriving in Buda, the envoy engaged in discussions regarding the possibility of a treaty with the Hungarian king. He mentioned that the Ottomans had gathered a grand army and were advancing, fully prepared to avenge Mezid Bey's earlier defeat. In Wallachia, Şehabeddin's purpose was to punish the Wallachians for their disloyalty, secure their continued allegiance to the Ottomans, and make an impressive show of force that would turn negotiations with the Hungarians in Buda in the favor of Ottomans.

Largely due to the efforts of Cardinal Cesarini, negotiations between Vladislaus I and Elizabeth resumed in mid-July. By mid-August, Vladislaus had secured the support of Despot George Branković, as well as the mediation of his opponent, Count Frederick of Cilli. As a result, Queen Elizabeth and her supporters became increasingly isolated, raising hopes that the civil war might be brought to an end and that a unified effort could be directed against the Ottomans. This also increased the troops available to defend the southern frontier, enabling Hunyadi to prepare more effectively for the expected Ottoman counter-offensive after the truce was rejected. Meanwhile, Hunyadi had been informed of the coming assault and had already made preparations. Hunyadi was able to gather his forces in Transylvania. According to Pálosfalvi, Hunyadi remained near the southern border of Transylvania. After crossing the Carpathians southward, he established a camp in the upper valley of the Ialomița River.

The negotiations with the Ottoman envoy may have been intended to mislead the Ottomans and facilitate Hungarian preparations, which could explain why Şehabeddin limited his campaign to Wallachia rather than invading Transylvania. The envoy may have been released without an agreement once Hungarian military preparations were complete, or negotiations between the Ottomans and Hungarians may still have been ongoing at the time of the battle between Hunyadi and Şehabeddin. Some Christian sources claim that Şehabeddin also intended to conquer Transylvania and sent raiders there. However, there is no independent evidence supporting this, although some later chroniclers mention such raids. Jean de Wavrin suggests that only the borders of Transylvania were targeted. It is also possible that Şehabeddin was instructed not to conduct raids deep into Transylvania due to ongoing peace negotiations in Buda, as such actions could undermine a potential treaty.

The Ottoman army crossed the Danube in the second half of the summer of 1442, and the akinjis began the systematic devastation of Wallachia, following the traditional procedure applied against disobedient vassals, Şehabeddin caused enormous destruction in Wallachia. Şehabeddin led his troops into Târgoviște, and the Wallachian capital was seized and burned. After removing Basarab II and ensuring the submission and allegiance of Mircea II, Şehabeddin left the city and set up camp. He then released the raiders to plunder Wallachia, and perhaps parts of Transylvania as well. Not considering resistance advisable, the Wallachians retreated to the mountains. The Vlachs had ensured that the Ottomans would not discover any food in their land, fully aware that the Turks would never attack them in the mountains. For over a week they waited in the hills while the Ottomans ravaged and plundered the countryside.

Hunyadi likely hoped to exploit the pasha's weakened position, as he had previously done in his victory over Mezid Bey. The janissaries, along with the provincial cavalry, were intended to defend his camp and prevent him from meeting a fate similar to that of Mezid Bey. According to Jean de Wavrin, they dug a fortified position around Şehabeddin's camp each night, complete with stakes, trenches, and a ring of camels. For this reason, Hunyadi chose not to attack the pasha's camp. Approximately a week after releasing the akinji, the last of the raiders arrived, prompting Şehabeddin to break camp. At this point, Hunyadi began to pursue the Ottomans from a safe distance, concealing his strength and waiting patiently for an opportunity. The patience of Hunyadi paid off. According to Ottoman sources, Şehabeddin became overconfident, much like Mezid Bey had, and was unaware of the size and proximity of the Hungarian army pursuing him.

== The battle ==
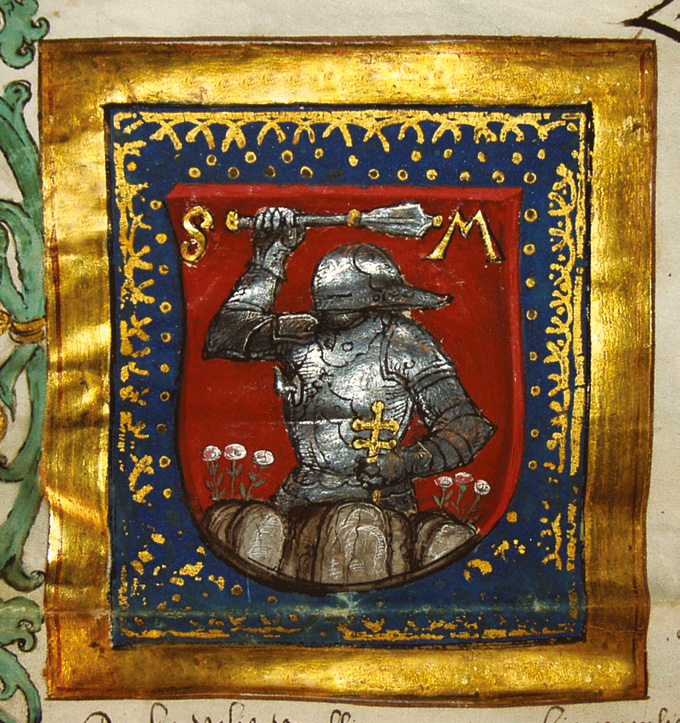
15th-century Hungarian heavily armoured soldier with mace

The exact circumstances of the battle, which took place on 2 or 6 September, and the events that preceded it, are as obscure as most of Hunyadi's early wars against the Ottomans. The exact site of the battle is unknown. The exact location remains a matter of considerable debate among historians. The court historian of King Matthias Corvinus of Hungary, Thuróczy (Chronica Hungarorum), asserts that the battle was fought at the Transylvanian Iron Gate Pass (Vaskapu in Hungarian), within the territory of the Kingdom of Hungary, and older historiography share this view. According to Hungarian historian Tamás Pálosfalvi, Thuróczy is well known for having used documents from the Hungarian royal archives, and their apparently contradictory reports led him astray. Pálosfalvi places the battle in the upper valley of the Ialomița River, located south of the Carpathian Mountains in Wallachia. Another court historian of King Matthias, Bonfini (Rerum Hungaricarum Decades), asserts that the battle was fought near the border of Transylvania at the Iron Gate, while the contemporary but rather confused narrative of Wavrin suggests that the retreating Ottomans were attacked while in the process of crossing the Danube. Additionally, the charter of King Vladislaus I of Hungary from 1443 states that at least as many fleeing Turks drowned as were slain in the battle. The American historian John Jefferson has suggested a battlefield along the Danube near the modern town of Călărași in southern Romania.

According to Jefferson, the battle took place on the Danube River. Şehabeddin ordered his troops to begin crossing the river back into Ottoman territory. In the absence of bridges over the Danube, the troops crossed by boat, while their horses were forced to swim across the river, as recorded by Wavrin. Considering the army's large size and the considerable amount of plunder, the crossing was likely slow and challenging. Şehabeddin's lack of caution therefore seems even more significant. After a large portion of the army had crossed, Hunyadi decided to launch the attack. On the morning of 2 September, Hunyadi unleashed his forces against the beylerbey and the rest of his army, which was still camped on the northern side of the Danube. The battle with these Ottoman forces, who despite their reduced numbers still represented a formidable threat, continued into the night. At this point, Şehabeddin acknowledged his defeat, and despite the sanjak beys remaining and fighting, he crossed the river under cover of darkness. Therefore, the timariot cavalry (sipahi, professional cavalrymen in the Ottoman army) commanded by the sanjak beys, were left most vulnerable to enemy attacks on the far side. All accounts focus on this group as having suffered the heaviest casualties. According to some Ottoman sources, all 16 sanjak beys were killed, representing around half of the sanjak beys in the Ottoman Empire. As several sources note, as many soldiers died in the waters as on the field of battle. According to a chronicle from Messembria, the Ottomans lost 28,000 troops in the battle. The Ottomans lost not only thousands of soldiers but also members of noble families.

According to Pálosfalvi, Ottoman sources portray Şehabeddin as overconfident and lacking caution, yet this characterization contradicts the accounts of both Wavrin and Bonfini, who stress the care with which he guarded his camp. It was most likely the absence of the akinji forces, which were conducting raids across Wallachia, that allowed Hunyadi to attack Şehabeddin's remaining troops somewhere near the foothills of the Carpathians. Pálosfalvi places the battle at the Ialomița River. It is difficult to explain how Hunyadi could have followed the retreating Ottomans as far as the Danube River without being detected and then caught them by surprise during the river crossing. According to Pálosfalvi, the battle was hard-fought, resulted in heavy casualties on both sides, and ended with the defeat of the Ottomans. Consequently, it was likely the survivors of the clash who later lost their lives while attempting to cross the Danube.

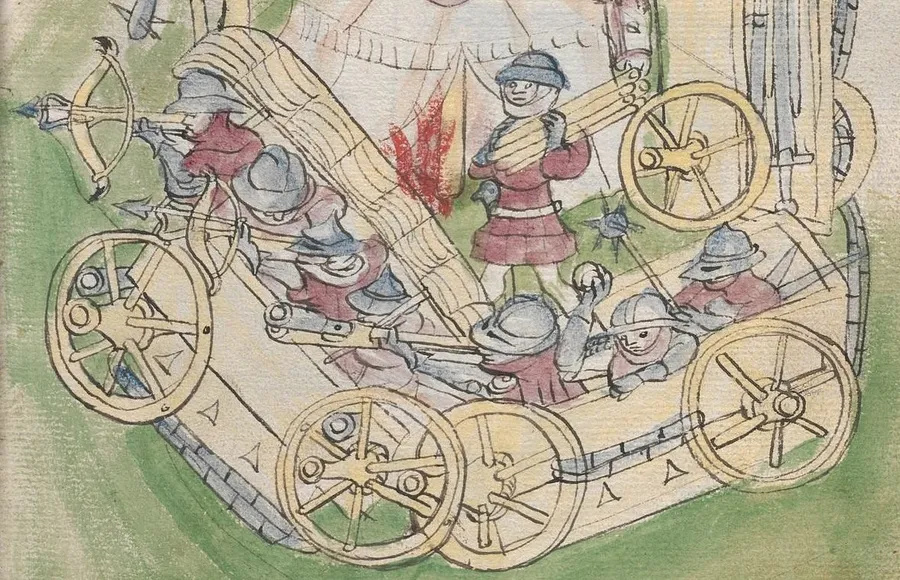
The Hussite wagon fort, a contemporary description from the 15th century

According to Pálosfalvi, although Bonfini, writing almost half a century later, provides a very detailed description of the battle, the battle order he attributes to Hunyadi matches more closely the conditions of the late 15th century, particularly those of mercenary forces of King Matthias of Hungary. However, Pálosfalvi notes that some part of Bonfini's narrative correctly reflects mid-15th-century military practices. Bonfini reports that Hunyadi deployed his war wagons, equipped with archers and small-calibre cannons, at the Ottoman rear while initiating a renewed assault on the front lines. This tactic, characteristic of Hussite warfare, may have surprised the Ottomans, who were probably seeing it for the first time. Well-equipped heavy cavalry and the use of Hussite wagon fort played a crucial role in the Hungarian victory.

Although Şehabeddin boasted of his large force, was overconfident, and swore revenge, he instead met with a defeat even more disastrous than that of Mezid Bey, which he had set out to avenge.

=== The battle according to Bonfini ===
In 1488, Antonio Bonfini was commissioned by King Matthias Corvinus, the son of John Hunyadi, to write the history of the Hungarians. Bonfini describes antique topoi, such as Livius-like rousing moral speeches delivered by both commanders before the battle. According to Bonfini, he drew on eyewitness accounts of the battle in his description. He states that Hunyadi relied primarily on his armoured cavalry, as well as on Székely warriors. Hunyadi arranged the Hungarian forces in a structured formation. He divided the heavy cavalry between the two wings and the center of the army. Missile troops were placed behind the flanks, while light cavalry was deployed in front of them. He positioned his heavy infantry in the center, with spearmen and archers held in reserve behind them. War wagons carrying light infantry were placed behind the lines, forming a defensive support near the foothills. The Ottoman army was arranged in multiple lines, with heavy cavalry in the center, janissaries on either side, and light cavalry sipahis deployed on the wings.

The Hungarian center advanced in a wedge formation to break through the larger Ottoman force, successfully splitting their lines. The Ottomans initially resisted with coordinated cavalry charges and counterattacks by the janissaries, while also attempting to encircle the advancing Hungarians, leading to fierce and chaotic fighting. Under pressure on the flanks, the Hungarians deliberately withdrew into more confined terrain and reorganized. They then launched a coordinated counterattack: heavy cavalry pressed forward from the front, while light infantry and war wagons struck from both sides. This coordinated maneuver disrupted and partially surrounded the Ottoman army, causing confusion, panic, and collapse.

== Aftermath ==
The Hungarian forces seized substantial plunder. In his haste to retreat, Şehabeddin abandoned the majority of his camp's possessions, which reportedly included 5,000 camels and an uncountable number of horses. 5000 prisoners and 200 Ottoman banners were captured, and Hunyadi distributed the reportedly enormous booty among his troops as a reward for their bravery.

At the time of Hunyadi's victory, negotiations for a possible Hungarian–Ottoman peace were still ongoing in Hungarian capital Buda. King Vladislaus I received the Ottoman emissary in a formal audience, attended by Cardinal Cesarini, along with the prelates and barons of both of his kingdoms. The Ottoman emissary stated that the sultan was inclined toward peace and proposed either the cession of Belgrade or the payment of tribute in exchange for a lasting peace. Both King Vladislaus I and the Royal Diet rejected the offer. Unaware of recently-occurring events, the envoy issued a threatening warning, that without agreement, otherwise the Ottomans would capture many more fortresses within two years. Soon after the ambassador's audience with the king, news of Şehabeddin's defeat reached the court at Buda. Convinced of their military advantage, the Hungarians dismissed the Ottoman envoy. With the balance of power shifted, the Ottoman envoy had no choice but to depart the Hungarian capital and report that peace with the Hungarians was no longer a possibility. The Ottomans now had to prepare for war.

After the victory over Şehabeddin Pasha, exploiting the confusion in the Ottoman ranks, Hunyadi invaded Bulgaria, burned the town of Vidin. Hunyadi's forces burned the ships used by the Ottomans to transport troops across the Danube and pillaged the estates of the akinji and marcher lords. Hunyadi returned with a significant booty and a large number of liberated Christians. According to Jefferson, then Hunyadi advanced westward to join forces with Újlaki and the Thallócis, whose territories remained under threat from Ottoman raiders. Upon arriving in southwestern Hungary, Hunyadi and his troops launched further military operations into Ottoman-held areas near Nándorfehérvár (now Belgrade, Serbia) in retaliation for Ottoman incursions into Slavonia earlier that year. As noted by Pálosfalvi, a campaign can be dated with certainty to March 1443. Acting jointly, the two Transylvanian voivodes, Hunyadi and Újlaki, led a rapid campaign into Serbia and the Bosnian region known as Usora, with the aim of disrupting Ottoman raiding bases there.

The Ottomans, upon hearing of the defeat and the significant losses of men, decided to lift their siege of Constantinople. The victory over Şehabeddin resulted in more than heavy casualties and a loss of morale for the Ottomans. For the Ottomans, military victories in offensive operations were also a means to fund further campaigns. Plunder was the primary source of income for akinji raiders, while captives provided both wealth and recruits for the Porte's slave army. This created an incentive to fight in future campaigns and helped equip and expand their armies. Hunyadi reversed this dynamic, forcing the Ottomans into defensive campaigns over the next two years, at great expense to the empire. The Christian threat prompted the enemies of the Porte to act, emboldening many to revolt within the Ottoman Empire. All of this was precisely what Halil Pasha had warned against. Şehabeddin was disgraced and removed from the office of beylerbey and replaced by Kasım Pasha. Nevertheless, he remained as vizier, allowing him to participate in the battles of the following year and partially restore his reputation.

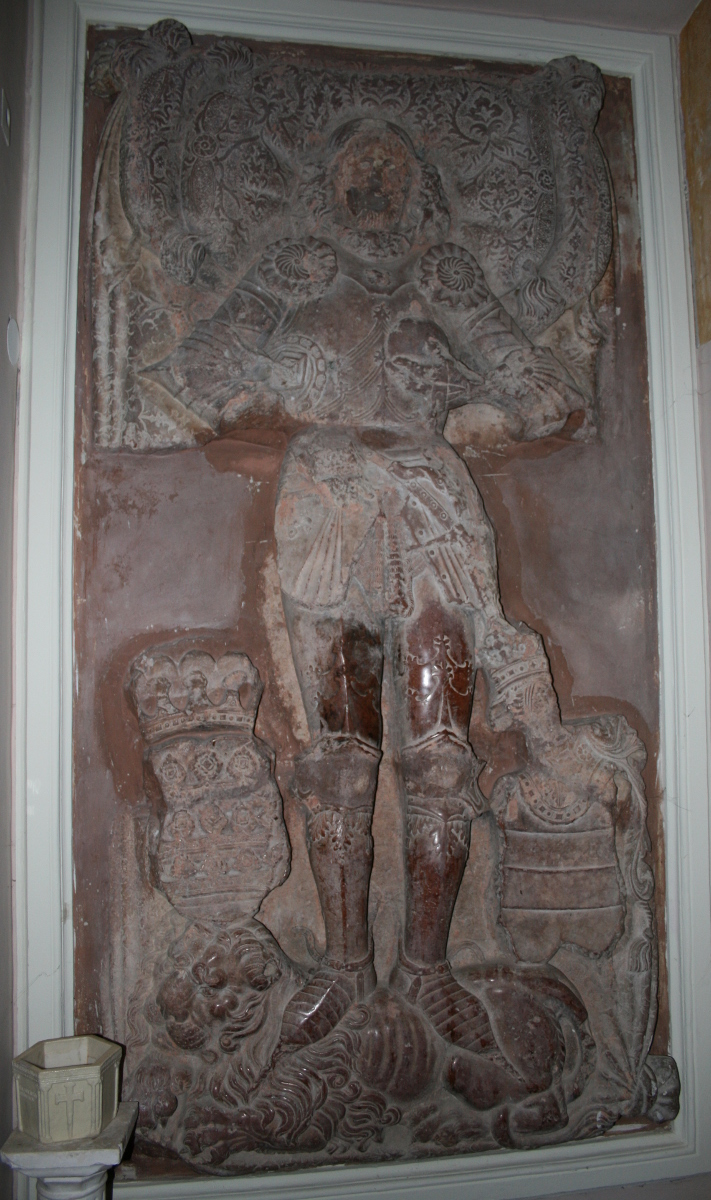
Gravestone of Nicholas Újlaki depicting his armor in the Church of Saint John of Capistrano in Ilok, Croatia

Since 1441, Hunyadi had adopted the Turkish policy of responding to each incursion with an equal or greater reprisal. He began to see the benefits of this approach. To counter the Ottomans, it was crucial to neutralize their advantage in intelligence and surprise. John Hunyadi excelled in this, building an effective scouting network that provided timely information and tactical superiority. His skill was so notable that Ottoman sources claimed he must have once served the sultan. During 1441–1442 campaigns, at the Battle of Bátaszék, his scouts revealed enemy positions and strength, allowing him to surprise and defeat a larger force. He used similar methods against Ishak Bey at the Battle of Smederevo, against Mezid Bey at the Battle of the Iron Gate, and most dramatically against Şehabeddin. In 1443, his intelligence foiled an ambush planned by Kasım Pasha and Turahan Bey, enabling him to defeat their divided forces at the Battle of Nish. Hunyadi often relied on local scouts. To gain more time to respond to Ottoman raids, he also established permanent scouts and border defenses along the routes leading into Hungary. As Thuróczy wrote:

Wherever the Turkish host broke into the country, by whatever hidden route it came in order to plunder in its accustomed manner, misfortune followed it everywhere; for, apart from the glorious campaigns of Lord Voivode John himself, his warriors – whom he had appointed to guard the realm – always defeated them. They cut off every route by which Hungary might be attacked; within the borders of the country, their spears could not flash in the gleam of the sun.

— Johannes Thuróczy: Chronica Hungarorum

News of Hunyadi's victories had reached well beyond Hungary's borders. Across the Western world, enthusiasm was growing for the campaign against the infidels. The idea of a Holy War, though strongly supported by Pope Eugenius IV, was also widely reviled. The pope dispatched his envoy, Cardinal Giuliano Cesarini, to Buda to mediate Hungary's internal conflicts and, above all, to urge the launch of a crusade against the Turks. The victorious Hungarian campaigns against the Ottomans in 1442 strengthened the position of Vladislaus I as king of Hungary. The Pope firmly aligned itself with him, seeking to restore Hungary's political unity in order to enable a renewed offensive against the Ottomans. Supporters of Elizabeth of Luxembourg were increasingly seen as obstructing not only internal peace but also efforts against the Ottomans. John Hunyadi was celebrated as a savior and a Hungarian national hero. Hunyadi emerged as the leading baron in the faction of Vladislaus and the military commander in whom people placed their hopes for a new campaign against the Ottomans. Using his rising fame and military-political influence, Hunyadi immediately began preparing a massive anti-Ottoman campaign, designed not for punitive plundering but for extensive military operations deep within Ottoman territory. Following the unexpected death of Queen Elizabeth on 24 December 1442, the divided factions of the Hungarian nation began to unite, encouraged by the successes of Hungarian forces. There was widespread talk of waging war against the infidels and their expulsion from Europe. The Hungarians became convinced that a large-scale international military coalition would have a strong chance of expelling the Ottomans from Europe. The sultan realized that the previously defensive strategy of the Hungarians would eventually develop into a large-scale offensive. The captured Ottoman banners were sent to various churches across Hungary. People gathered to offer prayers and thanksgiving, drawing strength from their faith for the monumental task ahead.

Hunyadi's victories in 1442 were a primary motivation for the successful Hungarian anti-Ottoman crusade of the winter of 1443–1444, known as the Long Campaign.

== Legacy ==
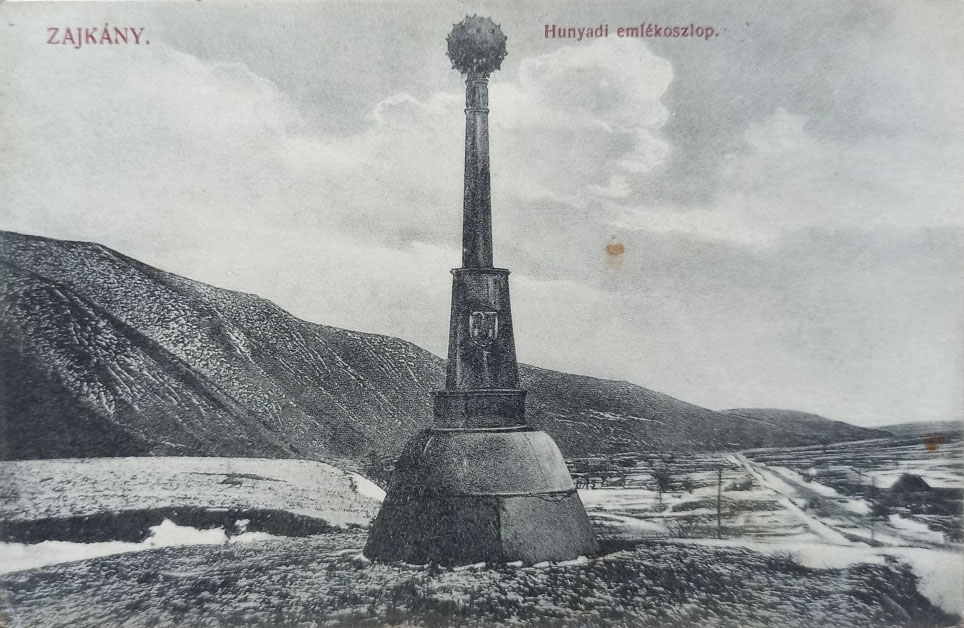
Battle memorial of John Hunyadi near the Transylvanian Iron Gate, in Zajkány, Hunyad County, Kingdom of Hungary (now Zeicani, Romania), erected in 1896 and destroyed in 1992

The victory of John Hunyadi against Şehabeddin Pasha and a large Ottoman army was his greatest battlefield victory, and his second greatest military accomplishment after the defense battle during the Siege of Belgrade in 1456. Through extensive intelligence and reconnaissance, advanced strategic planning, and swift and sudden action, Hunyadi was able to execute complex operations and force the enemy to fight on terms most favorable to his army.

The victory over the army of Şehabeddin was of major significance, as it marked the first Hungarian success against a large Ottoman force. This success, together with the defeat of Mezid Bey, brought Hunyadi international recognition and undermined the growing belief in Ottoman invincibility. The successes of Hunyadi in 1442 were celebrated throughout Europe, especially his victory over Şehabeddin. This was the first time a European army had defeated such a large Ottoman force, composed not only of raiders but also of provincial cavalry led by their own sanjak beys and accompanied by the elite, formidable janissaries. The pope was ecstatic. To honor the victory, the Venetians held a grand procession led by the doge, while the Florentines staged their own celebrations. The Duke of Burgundy ordered a crusade sermon from his confessor, followed by a procession in Dijon.

Although Wavrin's report that the enraged sultan ordered the execution of Şehabeddin Pasha, the beylerbey of Rumelia (the "vice-emperor" in some Christian sources) for his defeat was false, but it clearly reflects the impact the victory of Hunyadi had on contemporaries.

== Sources ==
- Babinger, Franz (1978). Hickman, William C. (ed.). Mehmed the Conqueror and His Time. Translated by Manheim, Ralph. Bollingen Series XCVI, Princeton University Press. ISBN 0-691-09900-6.
- Cartledge, Bryan (2011). The Will to Survive: A History of Hungary. C. Hurst & Co. ISBN 978-1-84904-112-6.
- Engel, Pál (2001). The Realm of St Stephen: A History of Medieval Hungary, 895–1526. I.B. Tauris Publishers. ISBN 1-86064-061-3.
- Jefferson, John (2012). The Holy Wars of King Wladislas and Sultan Murad: The Ottoman-Christian Conflict from 1438–1444. Leiden: Brill Publishers. ISBN 978-90-04-21904-5.
- Mureșanu, Camil (2021). John Hunyadi Defender of Christendom. Las Vegas: The Center for Romanian Studies, Histria Books. ISBN 978-1-59211-012-4.
- Pálosfalvi, Tamás (2018). From Nicopolis to Mohács: A History of Ottoman-Hungarian Warfare, 1389–1526. The Ottoman Empire and Its Heritage: Politics, Society and Economy 63. Leiden: Brill. ISBN 978-90-04-37565-9.
- Teke, Zsuzsa (1980). Hunyadi János és kora [John Hunyadi and his Times] (in Hungarian). Gondolat. ISBN 963-280-951-3.
- Turnbull, Stephen (2003). The Ottoman Empire 1326–1699. Essential Histories. New York, London: Osprey Publishing. ISBN 9781841765693.
