= Hungarian Civil War =

Hungarian Civil War may refer to:

- Brothers' Quarrel (1197–1203)
- Hungarian Civil War (1264–1265)
- Hungarian Civil War (1440–1442)
- Hungarian campaign of 1527–1528
