= Battle of the Iron Gate =

15th-century battle during the Ottoman–Hungarian Wars

- Part of the Hungarian–Ottoman Wars
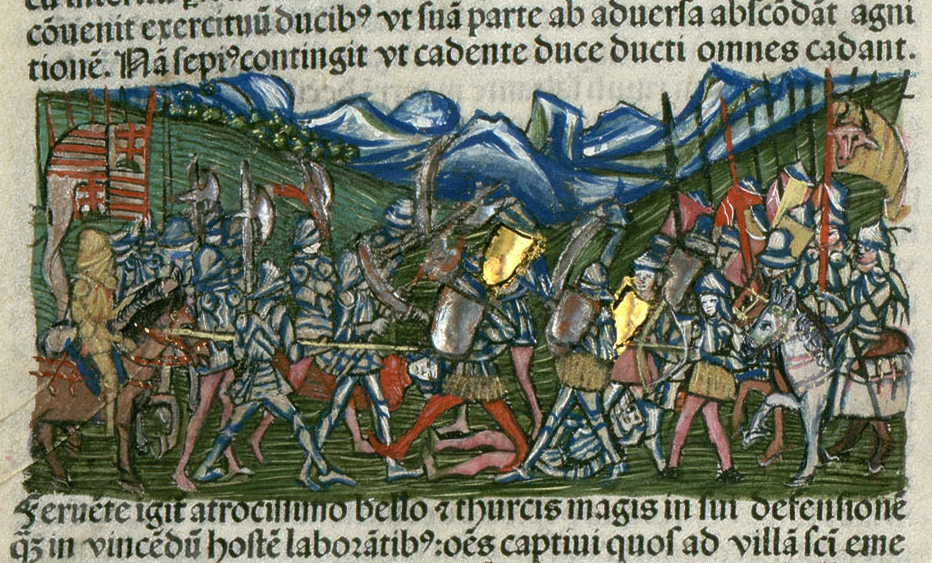
- The battle of John Hunyadi against Mezid Bey (Chronica Hungarorum, 1488)
Date	18 March and 22 March 1442
Location	Battles: First battle: Marosszentimre, Transylvania, Kingdom of Hungary (now Sântimbru, Romania); Second battle: Iron Gate Pass of Transylvania, Kingdom of Hungary (now Romania), (Hermannstadt/Szeben (now Sibiu, Romania) by older historiography)
Result	Szentimre, 18 March: Ottoman victory Iron Gate, 22 March: Hungarian victory

Belligerents
Kingdom of Hungary	Ottoman Empire

Commanders and leaders
John Hunyadi; György Lépes †	(Ottoman Empire) Mezid Bey †

Strength
Unknown	16,000

Casualties and losses
3,000	15,000; 20,000

The Battle of the Iron Gate (Battle of Hermannstadt/Szeben by older historiography) was fought between the army of the Kingdom of Hungary and the Ottoman Empire on 18 March and 22 March 1442, near Marosszentimre (now Sântimbru, Romania) and after at the Iron Gate Pass of Transylvania. The Hungarian forces were commanded by John Hunyadi and the Ottoman forces by Mezid Bey, the Marcher Lord of Nicopolis. This was Hunyadi's third victory over the Ottomans after the relief of Smederevo in 1437 and the defeat of Ishak Beg midway between Semendria and Belgrade in 1441.

== Disputed locations of the battle ==
The battle between Hunyadi and Mezid Bey within the Kingdom of Hungary: Older historiography places it at Szeben (now Sibiu, Romania) in Transylvania, while modern historiography locates the battle at the Iron Gate Pass (Vaskapu in Hungarian) in Hunyad county in southwestern Transylvania. According to historian Tamás Pálosfalvi, the location of the victorious battle has already been convincingly identified by Ottokár Székely near the Iron Gate in southwestern Transylvania (Hunyad County). This conclusion is supported by numerous contemporary documents, however, according to Pálosfalvi, unfortunately, some authors continue to rely on the incorrect claims of earlier historiography.

== Background ==
In 1438, Sultan Murad II personally led the largest raid on Hungary in living memory, an Ottoman expedition in Transylvania. The Ottoman invasion ravaged southeastern Hungary for 45 days, during which the Ottomans faced little resistance, except at Szeben (today Sibiu, Romania), where the resistance of citizens caused significant Ottoman casualties.

In 1441 John Hunyadi came to power. Hunyadi attacked the Ottomans in Serbia and at the Battle of Smederevo got the best of Ishak bey. The Ottoman Sultan, Murad II, proclaimed in the autumn of 1441 that a raid into Hungarian Transylvania would take place in March 1442. In early March 1442, the marcher lord Mezid Bey led 16,000 akinji cavalry raiders into Transylvania, crossing the Danube to Wallachia at Nicopolis and marching north in formation.

== Battle ==
Anti-Ottoman campaigns of John Hunyadi, 1440–1456

On March 18 bishop György Lépes' forces (2,000 men) clashed with Mezid near Sântimbru. The Ottomans won by force of numbers and Hunyadi was forced to retreat, but Mezid did not pursue Hunyadi. Lépes was taken prisoner and Mezid beheaded the bishop.

Hunyadi's army regrouped near Hermannstadt. Simon Kemény (sometimes: Kamonyai) swapped his armour for Hunyadi's armour so that the Turks would believe he was Hunyadi. Kamonyai was to execute a head-on attack, while Hunyadi went around Mesid's army. Kamonyai was killed in action, however Hunyadi with the Hungarian heavy cavalry charged Mesid, crushed the Turks and killed Mezid. Hunyadi was able to ransom Lépes's head with Mesid's head.

According to the viewpoint of classic historiography, Transylvania was caught by surprise by the Ottoman attack. Voivode John Hunyadi had only recently arrived in the region before the raid and, together with the bishop of Transylvania, György Lépes, hastily gathered an army and charged at the Turks. However, they were defeated near Gyulafehérvár (now Alba Iulia, Romania), the bishop was killed on the battlefield, and Hunyadi was wounded. However, Hunyadi, without hesitation, called the people of the province to arms – nobles, Székelys, and peasants alike – and just five days later, he delivered a decisive defeat to the Turkish army. However, according to historian Tamás Pálosfalvi, Hunyadi was not present at this first battle, which took place in Marosszentimre (now Sântimbru, Romania). The Thuróczy chronicle preserved the information that Hunyadi arrived in Transylvania only directly before the first battle. The credibility of this information is reinforced by the fact that, according to a charter issued by King Vladislaus I of Hungary, the first clash occurred unexpectedly. According to Pálosfalvi, the battle could not have been unforeseen if Hunyadi had already been in Transylvania awaiting the Turkish attack. The wounded Hunyadi likely had little opportunity, in just four days, to meaningfully replenish his battle-weary army and launch a surprise attack on the retreating Turks, who were undoubtedly made more cautious by their own losses. Also, in just four days, no meaningful mobilization could have been carried out, let alone catching up with the retreating Turkish army.

Hunyadi was encamped with his troops around Temesvár (now Timișoara, Romania), prepared to intervene wherever his presence might be required. His late arrival in Transylvania, and the consequent defeat of the local army, which resulted in the death of the Bishop of Transylvania, was explained by the fact that the Ottomans had also launched an attack on Slavonia, compelling Hunyadi to wait until the second Ottoman army had moved westward.

According to Pálosfalvi, the location of Hunyadi's subsequent victory over the retreating Mezid Bey was the Vaskapu (Iron Gate) in Hunyad County, the location of the victorious battle has already been convincingly identified by Ottokár Székely near the Iron Gate in southwestern Transylvania. This identification is supported by a letter written by Hunyadi himself a few years later, under similar circumstances. This conclusion is supported by numerous contemporary documents, however, according to Pálosfalvi, unfortunately, some authors continue to rely on the incorrect claims of earlier historiography.

== Aftermath ==
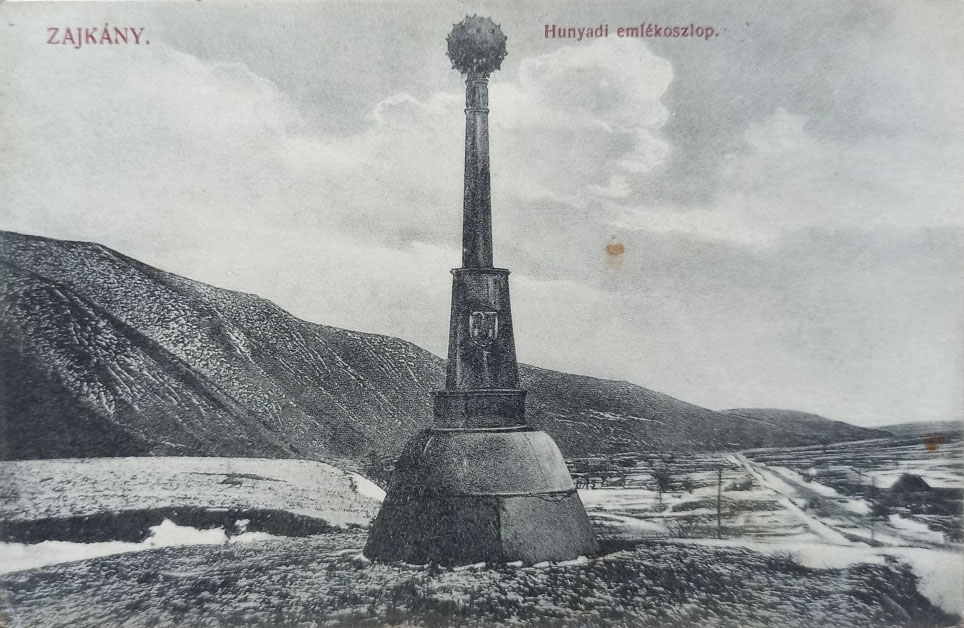
Battle memorial of John Hunyadi near the Transylvanian Iron Gate, in Zajkány, Hunyad County, Kingdom of Hungary (now Zeicani, Romania), erected in 1896 and destroyed in 1992

When John Hunyadi defeated Mezid Bey and the raiding Ottoman army in the southern part of the Kingdom of Hungary in Transylvania, Hunyadi chased the Ottomans beyond the Hungarian borders and the Hungarian army penetrated Wallachia at the Red Tower Pass, Hunyadi forced Voivode Vlad II Dracul to again be a Hungarian vassal. Later continuing his campaign, Hunyadi also forced the Moldavian voivodes Ilie and Stephen II, who until that time had recognized the authority of the Polish king, to renew their loyalty to the Hungarian king.

A wagon heavily laden with booty, said to require ten horses to draw it, was dispatched to the Serbian Despot George Branković, an ally of Hungary. The wagon was topped with the impaled heads of Mezid Bey and his son and was accompanied by an elderly Turk who was forced to present the trophy.

The defeat of Mezid Bey in Transylvania and the surrender of the Wallachian and Moldavian voivodes incited Sultan Murad II to revenge; he was resolved to a general, large-scale retaliatory campaign against the Kingdom of Hungary for the following year, which he intended to lead personally. In order to immediately avenge the defection of the Wallachian voivode and the defeat of Mezid Bey, the Sultan entrusted one of his famous lieutenants, Beylerbey (governor) Şehabeddin of Rumelia, who volunteered for this task with great confidence wishing to punish Wallachia and Transylvania. Sultan Murad II tasked him to not dare return before the conquest of the two territories had been achieved.

At the Battle of the Ialomița, Hunyadi wiped out Shehabbedin's army in the second greatest victory of Hunyadi's career, surpassed only by the rout of the Ottoman sultan's army in 1456 at the Siege of Belgrade.

== Sources ==
- Pál Földi. Nagy hadvezérek ("Great Warlords"), Anno Publisher, ISBN 963-9066-66-4
