= Hadım Şehabeddin =

Ottoman general and governor

Hadım Şehabeddin Pasha
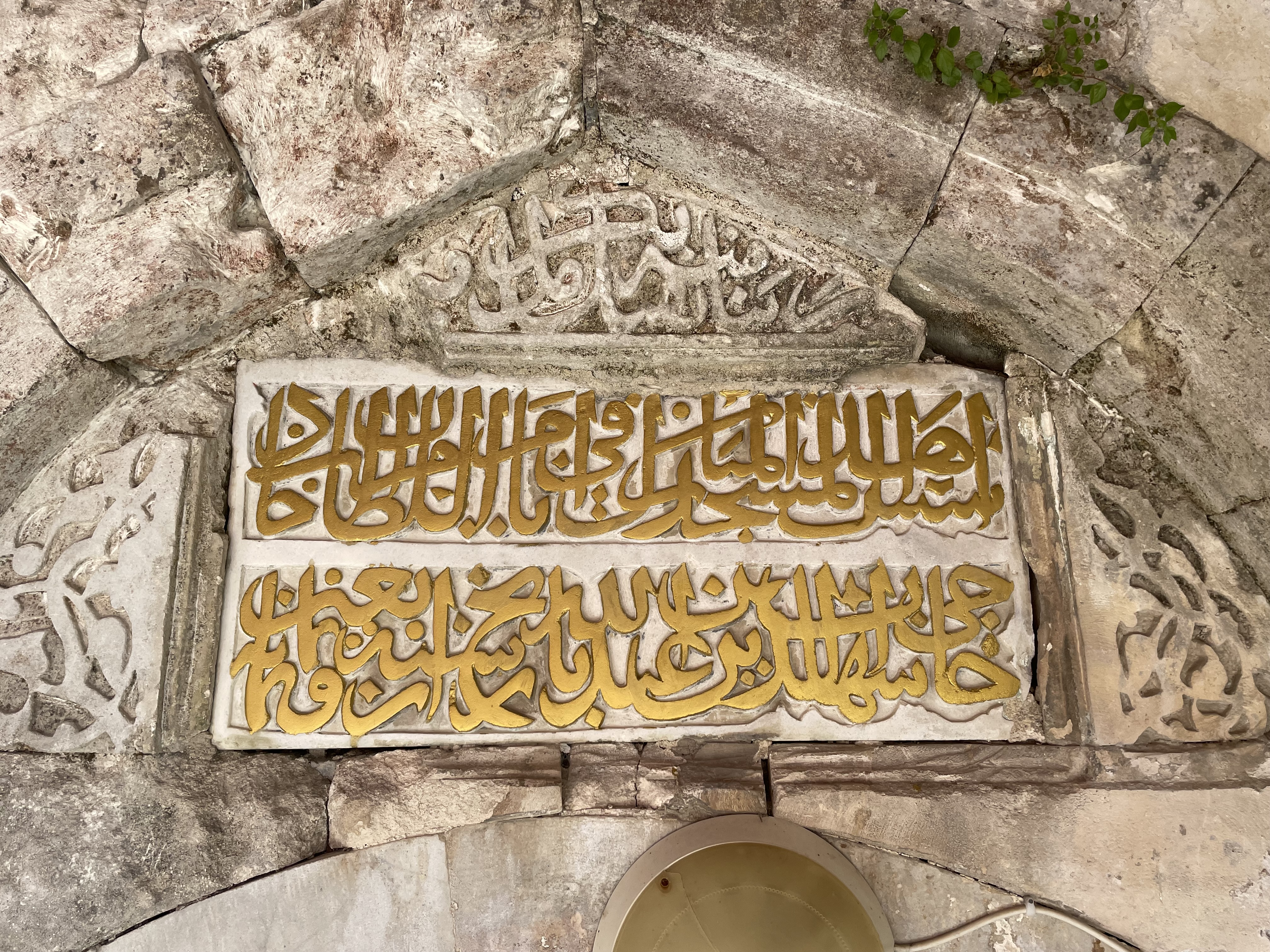
- The foundation inscription on the entrance door of Şehabeddin Pasha's Mosque, known today as the "Kirazlı Mosque" in Edirne, Turkey, contains Arabic writing that mentions the name of the founder as follows, from which it is understood that his father’s name was “Abdullah”: “This blessed mosque was founded during the reign of Sultan Murad Khan, by Hajji Shehab al-Din son of Abdullah, in the year 840 [Hijri].”
- Died: 1453; Bursa, Ottoman Empire (modern-day Turkey)
- Burial place: Plovdiv, Ottoman Empire (modern-day Bulgaria)
- Military career
- Rank: Kapi Agha; sanjakbey of Albania; beylerbey of Rumelia Eyalet
- Nickname: Kula Şahin
- Conflicts: Serbian–Ottoman wars; Siege of Novo Brdo (1440–41); Ottoman–Hungarian wars; Battle of the Ialomița; Battle of Varna

Hadım Şehabeddin Pasha (Old Turkish: Şihābüddīn; fl. 1436–53), also called Kula Şahin Pasha, was an Ottoman general and governor that served Sultan Mehmed II (r. 1444–46; 1451–81). Brought to the Ottoman court at a young age, Şehabeddin started as a court eunuch (hadım), then advanced to become Kapi Agha, a close advisor to the Sultan, before being appointed governor (sanjakbey) in Albania, and then at the height of his career, provincial governor (beylerbey) of Rumelia (1439–42). Şehabeddin was known as ardent supporter of the expansionist policy of Ottoman Empire. He commanded the Ottoman forces that captured Novo Brdo in 1441. After his forces were heavily defeated in a battle with forces of Janos Hunyadi in September 1442, he was dismissed from the position of beylerbey. After 1444 he was again briefly appointed to the position of beylerbey of Rumelia. Şehabeddin died in 1453 in Bursa.

== Name and early life ==
Şehabeddin is commonly identified also as Kula Şahin Paşa. In some sources the nickname "Kula" was mistakenly translated as "brown falcon", although kula (not kule) is actually a reference to his slave origin (kul), because he was a devşirme conscript. "Şahin" is the common shortening of his name, "Şehabeddin". The founding inscription at the Kirazli mosque dated 1436–37, commonly identified as the foundation of Şehabeddin, names his father "Abdullah". He was brought to the Ottoman court at very young age, as a slave, and was probably of Georgian descent. He completed the Enderun School and served as a court eunuch (thus honourably titled hadim) in the sultan's harem and palace.

== Military career ==
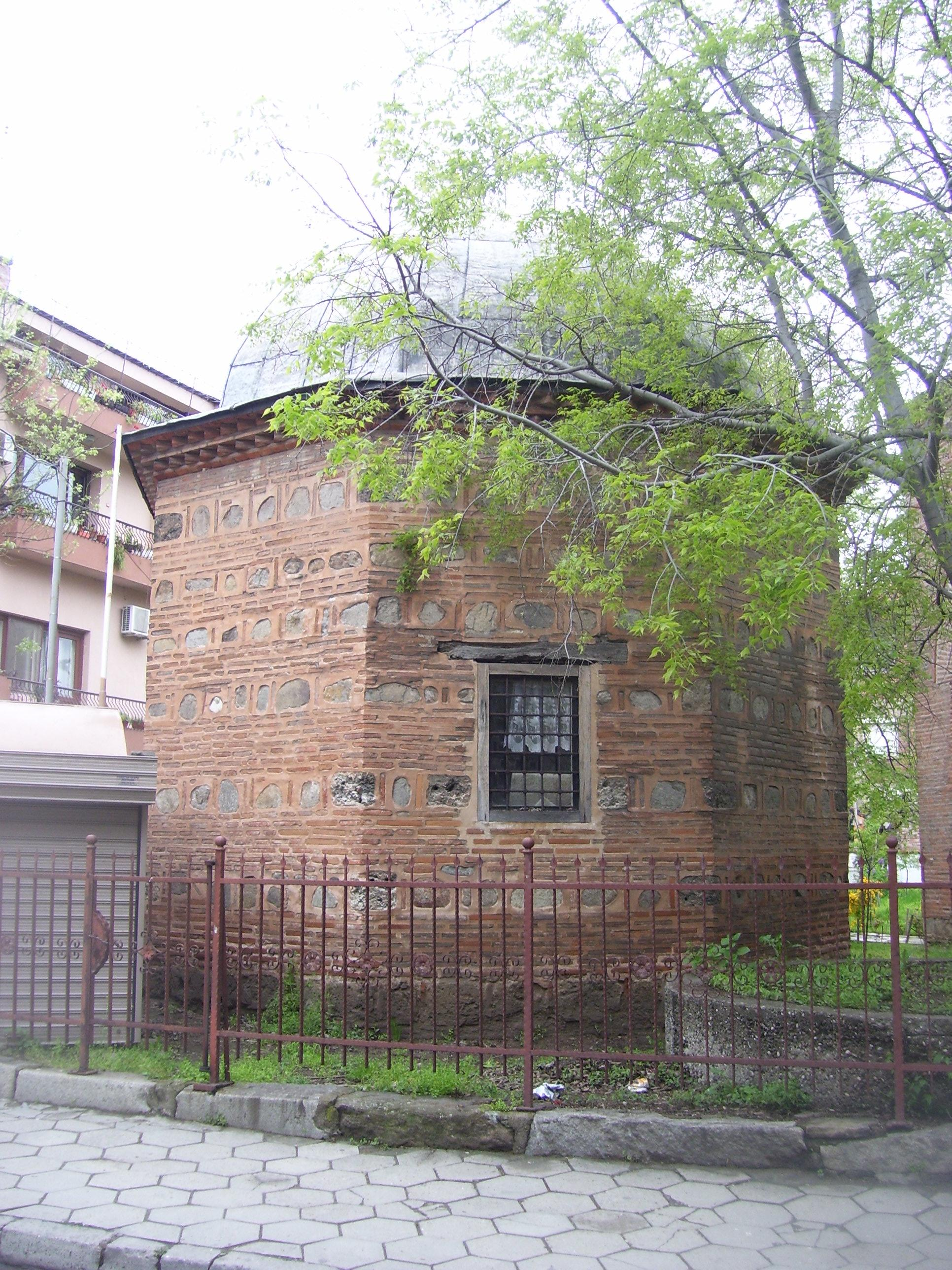
Türbe of Hadim Şehabeddin in Plovdiv

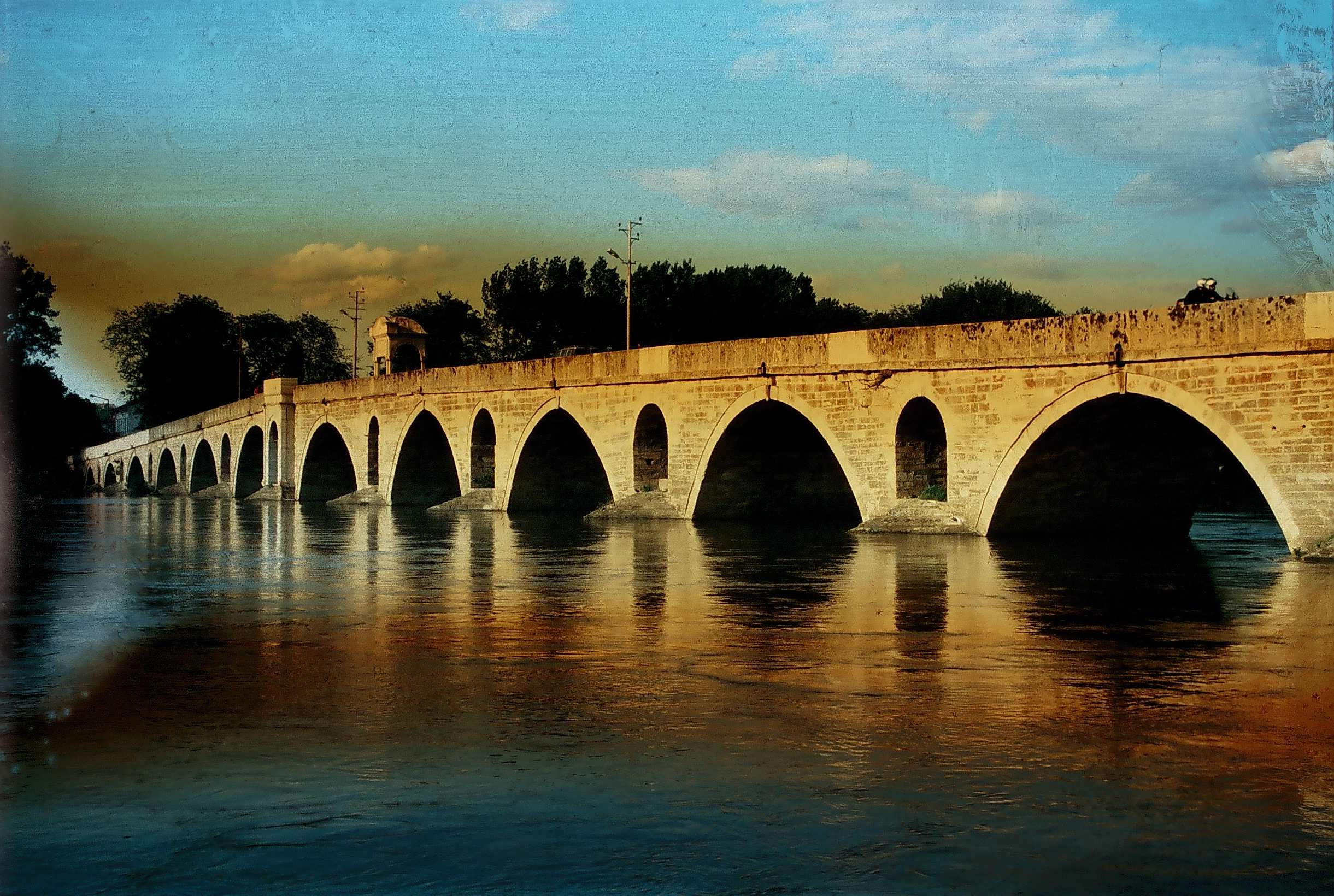
In 1451 the Saraçhane Bridge across the Tunca River in Edirne was built against orders of Şehabeddin

He advanced in the court hierarchy and became Kapi Agha (the head of the Inner Palace and the eunuch gatekeepers) which was the most powerful position a slave could reach at the Ottoman court. At this position, he was the channel for all petitions to the sultan, which provided him with an opportunity to have a certain influence on both the sultan and petitioners. The first position of Şehabeddin outside the sultan's palace was in Gjirokastër, as the sanjakbey (governor) of Sanjak of Albania. In 1439 he was appointed to the highest military position in the empire, the beylerbey (provincial governor) of the Rumelia Eyalet. Şehabeddin has been known as one of the "falcons" in the sultan's palace and an advocate of the aggressive expansionist Ottoman policy. Being hadim meant that he had access to the sultan's family which included his son known as Mehmed the Conqueror, in whom he might have planted the seed of thirst for expansion of the empire.Against the orders of Şehabeddin the Ottoman forces captured and garrisoned medieval fortress Žrnov, located on the highest top of Avala (in Serbia), and enforced its fortifications under the Pasha's direct supervision. On 13 June 1441 Şehabeddin, who was in Vučitrn at the time, wrote a letter to the Ragusans in which he guaranteed safe conduct to Ragusan diplomats. On 27 June 1441 forces under the command of Şehabeddin captured the mining district of Novo Brdo, after having looted and burnt the town itself. Şehabeddin received Ragusan diplomat Primović in Dobrijevo near Vučitrn and advised him that Ragusans should "honor sultan" with rich presents if they want to avoid paying tribute to Ottoman Empire. They took his advice and after a lot of effort reached an agreement with viziers and sultans to send them rich presents every year.

The defeat of Mezid Bey in Transylvania in Kingdom of Hungary at the Battle of Iron Gate, and the surrender of the Wallachian voivode incited Sultan Murad II for revenge, he decided a general, large-scale retaliatory campaign against the Kingdom of Hungary. In order to immediately avenge the defection of the Wallachian voivode and the defeat of Mezid Bey, the Sultan entrusted one of his famous lieutenant, Şehabeddin, who offered himself voluntarily for this task with great confidence On 2 or 6 September 1442 an army commanded by Şehabeddin and 16 sanjakbeys subordinated to him. The Battle of the Ialomița was fought between the army of the Kingdom of Hungary and the Ottoman Empire, John Hunyadi defeated the army of Şehabeddin Pasha, the Provincial Governor of Rumelia. After this defeat Şehabeddin was dismissed from the position of beylerbey of Rumelia. In 1444 Şehabeddin appeared as commander of the forces that fought against Orhan, the challenger of the sultan's throne and again as beylerbey of Rumelia, in Varna. His advocacy of the aggressive expansionist policy made him the main rival of Çandarlı Halil Pasha the Younger. He died in 1453 in Bursa after he had witnessed the success of the expansionist policy he has always been advocating when Ottomans captured Constantinople and executed his main rival Çandarlı Halil Pasha.

== Legacy ==
Şehabeddin built a mosque in 1436 in Adrianople. It is known as Hacı Şahabettin Camii or Kirazlı Cami (English: the Cherry Mosque). Evliya Çelebi recorded that in Plovdiv Şehabeddin build a mosque, madrasa, han and caravansaray which were all named after him. In 1451 the Saraçhane Bridge across the Tunca River in Edirne was built against orders of Şehabeddin.

== Sources ==
- Dijkema, F. Th. (1977). The Ottoman Historical Monumental Inscriptions in Edirne. BRILL. pp. 24–25. ISBN 90-04-05062-0.
- Jefferson, John (17 August 2012). The Holy Wars of King Wladislas and Sultan Murad: The Ottoman-Christian Conflict from 1438-1444. BRILL. p. 84. ISBN 978-90-04-21904-5.
- Imber, Colin (1990). The Ottoman empire: 1300-1481. Isis. ISBN 978-975-428-015-9.
- Setton, Kenneth M.; Hazard, Harry W.; Zacour, Norman P. (1 June 1990). A History of the Crusades: The Impact of the Crusades on Europe. Univ of Wisconsin Press. p. 267. ISBN 978-0-299-10744-4.
- Rogers, Clifford J.; DeVries, Kelly; France, John (1 September 2012). Journal of Medieval Military History. Boydell Press. p. 154. ISBN 978-1-84383-747-3.

Political offices
Preceded by	Beylerbey of the Rumelia Eyalet; 1439—1442	Succeeded by Kasim Pasha
