= Hungarian war of succession (1440–1442) =

Hungarian war of succession of 1440–1442
Date	1440–1442
Location	Kingdom of Hungary
Result	Victory for Władysław III of Poland

Belligerents
Elizabeth of Luxembourg's and Ladislaus the Posthumous's force	Władysław III of Poland's force

Commanders and leaders
Elizabeth of Luxembourg; Ladislaus the Posthumous; Frederick III of Germany; Ulrich II, Count of Celje; Ladislaus Garai; John Jiskra of Brandýs; John Kórógyi	Władysław III of Poland; John Hunyadi; Nicholas of Ilok; Nicholas Perényi

Strength
Unknown	Unknown

Casualties and losses
Unknown	Unknown

The Hungarian war of succession of 1440–1442 was a war of succession in the Kingdom of Hungary between the supporters of Elizabeth of Luxembourg and her infant son, king Ladislaus V the Posthumous, and the supporters of King Vladislaus I the Jagiellonian (Władysław III in Poland). The conflict was caused on 27 October 1439 by the death of king Albert II of Habsburg, husband of the pregnant Elizabeth, who gave birth to Ladislaus on 22 February 1440 after Albert had already died (hence Ladislaus' nickname "the Posthumous").

== Background ==
In the summer of 1439, Sultan Murad II led a campaign to conquer Serbia, the southern Hungarian territories of Temesvár (now Timișoara, Romania) and Szörény (now Severin, Romania) also identified as potential targets. A general mobilization was ordered, and king Albert advanced to Titel in early September. By that time, Smederevo had already fallen to the Ottomans. The king, accompanied by the high nobility, committed himself to raising a fully paid army for a renewed campaign the following spring. However, the king died of dysentery on 27 October 1439 while returning to Vienna. King Albert left no male heir, but was survived by his pregnant wife, Elizabeth of Luxembourg, daughter of King Sigismund. After Albert's death, urgent Ottoman pressure led a group of Hungarian barons to invite the Polish king Władysław III (Vladislaus I in Hungary) to take the Hungarian throne rather than wait for that child to be born to the pregnant Elizabeth. The decision followed historical precedent, as Hungary and Poland – the two most powerful East-Central European countries – had shared a ruler under King Louis I, and a renewed union promised stronger, more effective resistance against the Ottomans through combined resources and armies.

Elizabeth gave birth to Ladislaus on 22 February 1440 in Vienna, where they were supported by Frederick III of Styria, Carinthia and Carnolia (who had just been elected King of the Romans and King of Germany on 2 February 1440 in Frankfurt). Between the supporters of Elizabeth and Vladislaus, a war of succession over Hungary was triggered by the coronation of the infant Ladislaus V at Székesfehérvár on 15 May 1440, just one week before Vladislaus entered Buda. The most threatening consequence of the Hungarian internal conflict was an Ottoman intervention, which manifested in the siege of Belgrade in early summer 1440.

== War ==
As the "key to the realm", the castle of Nándorfehérvár (now Belgrade, Serbia) was the largest and most fortified border stronghold of Hungary, regarded as the southern gate of the Hungarian Kingdom. In 1440, the Ottomans under Sultan Murad II laid siege to Belgrade, the most important Hungarian border fortress in the south, but they had to lift the siege after seven months due to the stiff resistance of the Hungarian garrison and the approaching winter season. This situation, combined with an ongoing civil war over the Hungarian royal succession, suggests that an Ottoman victory in 1440 could very likely have led to the collapse of the kingdom shortly thereafter. Despite this, many Hungarian nobles remained more concerned with the outcome of the internal conflict than with the threat posed by the Ottomans.

Shortly after Władysław's accession the conflict with the supporters of Elizabeth deepened. The western and northern parts of the country remained on the side of the queen and opposing magnates, chiefly the Counts of Celje (Cilli), the Garai family and Dénes Szécsi, Archbishop of Esztergom. In turn, the eastern regions and Transylvania upheld Władysław and his partisans, among them John Hunyadi who became a leading political and military figure in Hungary.

In order to assert her claim, Elizabeth had to maintain the wealthy mining counties in what now constitutes Slovakia and hired Hussite mercenaries from Bohemia commanded by John Jiskra. Jiskra undertook a quick campaign and occupied much of the fortresses and defensive posts in northern Hungary, often with the support of local populations and devotees that held Jiskra in high regard because of his fight for religious freedoms. As a benefactor to the mercenaries, Elizabeth had to pawn the Holy Crown and transfer tutelage over her newborn son to Frederick III. However, this proved insufficient to fund the war against Władysław; she was then forced to handover her privately owned Austrian estates and the Hungarian County of Sopron to the Habsburgs in late 1440 and early 1441. This conduct alienated many of the lords that initially supported Elizabeth's cause, including Nicholas of Ilok, Ban of Croatia, who switched sides and allied himself with Władysław and John Hunyadi.

The western territories as well as some 70 fortresses under Ulrich II, Count of Celje in modern-day Austria, Croatia and Slovenia remained stalwart and loyal to the queen. Before the end of 1440, Hunyadi attacked Győr but was unable to take the garrisoned city. He was, however, successful in capturing local townships and villages around Buda and Székesfehérvár to prevent the escape of nobles and designated traitors. This proved paramount when Ulrich II made an attempt to flee to Pressburg (Pozsony); he was caught by a Polish detachment and subsequently imprisoned at Władysław's behest. Concurrently, Ladislaus Garai instigated a rebellion in the south. Hunyadi, together with Nicholas of Ilok, annihilated Garai's army at Bátaszék on 1 January 1441. Their victory effectively put an end to the Hungarian civil war.In January 1441, Ulrich was released from captivity, pledged an oath of loyalty to Władysław and freed the hostages held by his troops.

The grateful king jointly appointed Hunyadi and Újlaki as Voivodes of Transylvania, Counts of the Székelys, Ispáns of Temes County, and Captains of Belgrade, entrusting them with the defense of the southern marches. In practice, Hunyadi led, while Újlaki mainly delegated authority and supplied troops when needed. Hunyadi brought a decisive change to the Hungarian government's approach to the Ottoman threat.

Anti-Ottoman campaigns of John Hunyadi, 1440–1456

The victorious Hungarian campaigns against the Ottomans in 1442 (Battle of the Iron Gate in March and Battle of the Ialomița in early September) strengthened the position of Vladislaus I as king of Hungary. The Pope firmly aligned itself with him, seeking to restore Hungary's political unity in order to enable a renewed offensive against the Ottomans. Supporters of Elizabeth of Luxembourg were increasingly seen as obstructing not only internal peace but also efforts against the Ottomans. Hunyadi emerged as the leading baron in the faction of Vladislaus and the military commander in whom people placed their hopes for a new campaign against the Ottomans. Using his rising fame and military-political influence, Hunyadi immediately began preparing a massive anti-Ottoman campaign, designed not for punitive plundering but for extensive military operations deep within Ottoman territory.

== Aftermath ==
Elizabeth prolonged her resistance until December 1442, when a peace treaty was signed at Győr under the auspices of Cardinal Julian Cesarini. Elizabeth died not long after meeting Władysław and exchanging gifts; her supporters claimed that she was poisoned on his orders to prevent their marriage. Cesarini had the treaty ratified by Frederick under the pressure of Pope Eugene, though Frederick abstained from doing so until May 1444. The internal unrest caused Hungary to become vulnerable militarily and was severely weakened for the Turkish campaign.

== Bibliography ==
- Cartledge, Bryan (2011). The will to survive: a history of Hungary. London: C. Hurst & Co. ISBN 978-1-84904-112-6. OCLC 1412550527.
- Jefferson, John (2012). The Holy Wars of King Wladislas and Sultan Murad: The Ottoman-Christian Conflict from 1438–1444. Leiden: Brill Publishers. ISBN 978-90-04-21904-5.
- Kokkonen, Andrej; Sundell, Anders (September 2017). "The King is Dead: Political Succession and War in Europe, 1000–1799" (PDF). Qog Working Paper Series. Gothenburg: University of Gothenburg: 51. ISSN 1653-8919.
  - (Appendix) Kokkonen, Andrej; Sundell, Anders (September 2017). Online supplementary appendix for "The King is Dead: Political Succession and War in Europe, 1000–1799" (PDF). Gothenburg: University of Gothenburg. p. 40.
- Mureșanu, Camil (2019). John Hunyadi Defender of Christendom. Las Vegas: The Center for Romanian Studies, Histria Books. ISBN 978-1-59211-012-4.
- Pálosfalvi, Tamás (2018). From Nicopolis to Mohács: A History of Ottoman-Hungarian Warfare, 1389–1526. The Ottoman Empire and Its Heritage: Politics, Society and Economy 63. Leiden: Brill. ISBN 978-90-04-37565-9.
- Reddaway, W. F.; Penson, J. H.; Halecki, O.; Dyboski, R., eds. (1951). The Cambridge History of Poland. Cambridge University Press. OL 43126952W.
- Setton, Kenneth Meyer (1969). A History of the Crusades. Vol. 6. Madison: University of Wisconsin Press. ISBN 9780299107444.
- Setton, Kenneth Meyer (1976). The Papacy and the Levant, 1204-1571. Volume II: The Fifteenth Century. Philadelphia: American Philosophical Society. p. 580. ISBN 0-87169-127-2.
