= Iron Gate Pass of Transylvania =

Iron Gate Pass
- Location within Romania
- Elevation: 669 m (2,195 ft)

Third Approach
- Location: Romania
- Range: Southern Carpathians
- Coordinates: 45°30.25′N 22°41.29′E

The Transylvanian Iron Gate Pass (Romanian: Pasul Poarta de Fier a Transilvaniei, Hungarian: Erdélyi Vaskapu / Vaskapu-hágó / Vaskapu-szoros, German: Eisernes-Tor-Pass, all of these names meaning Iron Gate Pass in the respective languages) is a mountain pass in the Carpathians, located in Hunedoara County, Transylvania, Romania. It should not be confused with the more famous Danube gorge to the south, known as the "Iron Gates", among others.

== History ==
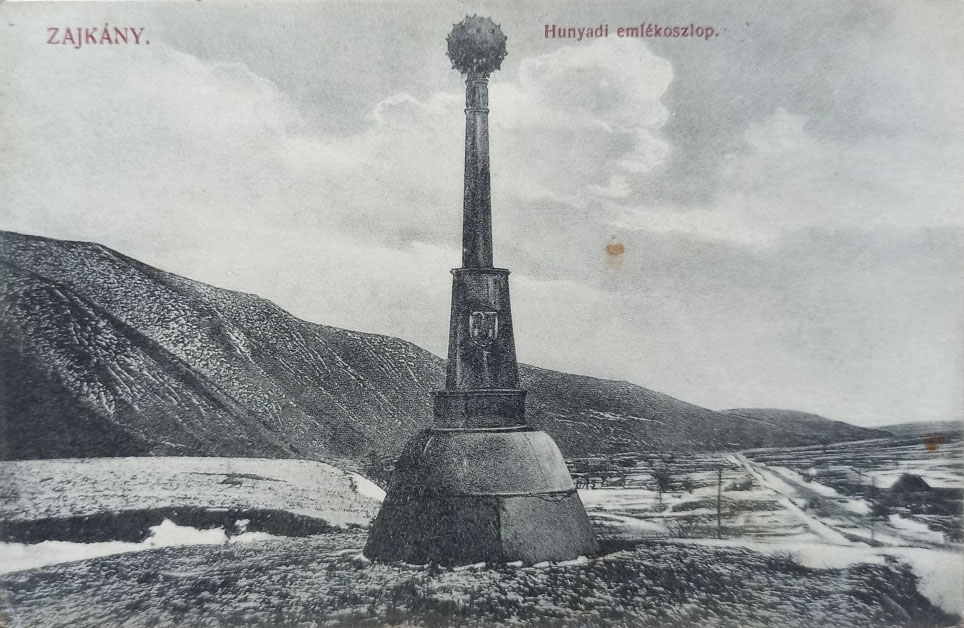
Battle memorial of John Hunyadi near the Transylvanian Iron Gate, in Zajkány, Hunyad County, Kingdom of Hungary (now Zeicani, Romania), erected in 1896 and destroyed in 1992

The battle between John Hunyadi and Mezid Bey (March 1442), fought within the Kingdom of Hungary, is placed by older historiography at Hermannstadt/Szeben (now Sibiu) in Transylvania, while modern historiography locates it at the Iron Gate Pass (Vaskapu) in Hunyad County, southwestern Transylvania.

The battle between John Hunyadi and Şehabeddin Pasha (September 1442), placed by older historiography at the Transylvanian Iron Gate Pass (Vaskapu) within Kingdom of Hungary, is located by modern historiography in the upper Ialomița River valley, south of the Carpathians in Wallachia.

== Sources ==
- Babinger, Franz (1978). Mehmed the Conqueror and His Time. Princeton University Press. ISBN 0-691-09900-6.
- Jefferson, John (2012). The Holy Wars of King Wladislas and Sultan Murad: The Ottoman-Christian Conflict from 1438–1444. Leiden: Brill Publishers. ISBN 978-90-04-21904-5.
- Mureșanu, Camil (2021). John Hunyadi Defender of Christendom. Las Vegas: The Center for Romanian Studies, Histria Books. ISBN 978-1-59211-012-4.
- Pálosfalvi, Tamás (2018). From Nicopolis to Mohács: A History of Ottoman-Hungarian Warfare, 1389–1526. The Ottoman Empire and Its Heritage: Politics, Society and Economy 63. Leiden: Brill. ISBN 978-90-04-37565-9.
