= Battle of Smederevo (1441) =

Battle in 1441

- Part of the Hungarian–Ottoman Wars
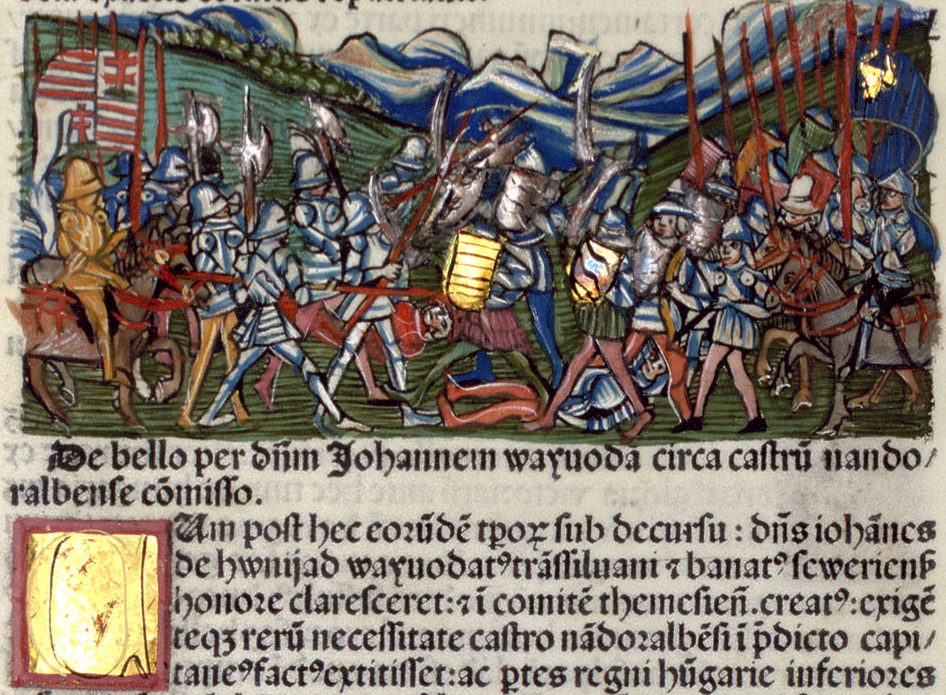
- The battle of John Hunyadi in 1441 (Chronica Hungarorum, 1488)
Date	Summer 1441
Location	Smederevo, Serbia
Result	Hungarian victory

Belligerents
Kingdom of Hungary	Ottoman Empire

Commanders and leaders
John Hunyadi; Nicholas of Ilok	(Ottoman Empire) Ishak Bey

Strength
"Handful"	More than the Hungarians

Casualties and losses
Unknown	Heavy

The Battle of Smederevo, also referred by some sources as the Battle of Belgrade, was a battle fought between the armies of the Kingdom of Hungary and the Ottoman Empire in the summer of 1441 near Smederevo in present-day Serbia. This battle was one of the first victories of John Hunyadi over the Ottomans.

== Background ==
The Ottoman advance that began in 1438 was halted at the Siege of Belgrade in 1440.

John Hunyadi was appointed Ban of Szörény in 1439. Hunyadi, together with Nicholas Újlaki, annihilated the troops of the opponents of King Vladislaus I at Bátaszék at the very beginning of 1441. Their victory effectively put an end to the Hungarian civil war. The grateful king appointed Hunyadi and his comrade joint Voivodes of Transylvania and Counts of the Székelys in February. Hunyadi also became Chief Captain of Nándorfehérvár (now Belgrade) and the ispán (head) of several southern counties of the Kingdom of Hungary, assuming responsibility for the defense of the frontiers. John Hunyadi immediately advocated for an offensive, anti-Ottoman strategy after taking control of the southern frontiers. In 1441, Hunyadi began to make raids on the Ottoman countryside in Serbia and by the Battle of Smederevo he defeated Ishak Bey, the commander of Smederevo. Hunyadi pursued Ishak Bey and his men all the way to the gates of Smederevo, killing and capturing as many of the enemy as possible along the way.

The operation of Hunyadi aimed to devastate the area in the same manner as Turkish raiders typically did. After three days of plundering, Hunyadi was on his way back to Belgrade when his path was blocked by the troops of Ishak Bey of Smederevo. In the ensuing clash, the Hungarian commander emerged victorious.

== Battle ==
Ottoman Campaigns of John Hunyadi, 1440–1456

In the summer of 1441 Ishak Bey attacked Belgrade on Sultan Murad's order. He burned and destroyed anything in his path to Belgrade; that's how Hunyadi and Újlaki were able to track him.

The Ottomans launched the attack at the Hungarian army, but thanks to the Hungarian heavy cavalry the Ottomans were routed and were chased back to Smederevo.

== Aftermath ==
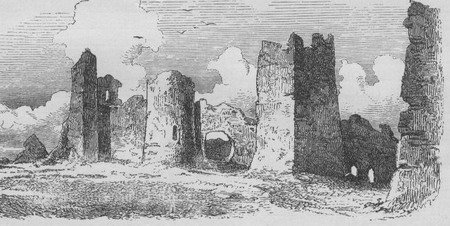
A drawing of Žrnov by Felix Philipp Kanitz, second half of the 19th century

After the battle Hunyadi captured valuable booty and important ottomans which he then returned to Belgrade.

The Sultan was upset by the defeat of Ishak Bey and ordered a massive raid against Hungary. The Hungarian court was informed about the planned Ottoman invasion of March in 1442. Hunyadi had the responsibility for the defense of the southern frontiers. Before the anticipated Ottoman attack, Hunyadi mobilized the forces of the entire southeastern defensive section.

The defeat of Ishak Bey led Şehabeddin Pasha, the Provincial Governor of Rumelia, to build the fortress of Žrnov on the highest top of the Avala Mountain, 9 miles south of Belgrade.

The Turkish raids into the Kingdom of Hungary continued intermittently over the following years, up until the crushing defeats of Ottomans in several battles in 1442.

== Sources ==
- Babinger, Franz (1978). Mehmed the Conqueror and His Time. Princeton University Press. ISBN 0-691-09900-6.
- Cartledge, Bryan (2011). The Will to Survive: A History of Hungary. C. Hurst & Co. ISBN 978-1-84904-112-6.
- Engel, Pál (2001). The Realm of St Stephen: A History of Medieval Hungary, 895–1526. I.B. Tauris Publishers. ISBN 1-86064-061-3.
- Jefferson, John (2012). The Holy Wars of King Wladislas and Sultan Murad: The Ottoman-Christian Conflict from 1438–1444. Leiden: Brill Publishers. ISBN 978-90-04-21904-5.
- Mureșanu, Camil (2021). John Hunyadi Defender of Christendom. Las Vegas: The Center for Romanian Studies, Histria Books. ISBN 978-1-59211-012-4.
- Pálosfalvi, Tamás (2018). From Nicopolis to Mohács: A History of Ottoman-Hungarian Warfare, 1389–1526. The Ottoman Empire and Its Heritage: Politics, Society and Economy 63. Leiden: Brill. ISBN 978-90-04-37565-9.
- Teke, Zsuzsa (1980). Hunyadi János és kora [John Hunyadi and his Times] (in Hungarian). Gondolat. ISBN 963-280-951-3.
