= Hunyad County =

County of the Kingdom of Hungary

Hunyad County Comitatus Hunyadensis (Latin) Hunyad vármegye (Hungarian) Komitat Hunyad (German) Comitatul Hunedoara (Romanian)
- County of the Kingdom of Hungary (1265–1526); County of the Eastern Hungarian Kingdom (1526–1570); County of the Principality of Transylvania (1570–1867); County of the Kingdom of Hungary (1867–1920)
- Coat of arms

- Capital: Déva
- Area
  - Coordinates: 45°53′N 22°54′E
  - 1910: 7,809 km^{2} (3,015 sq mi)
- Population
  - 1910: 340,100
- History
  - Established: 1265
  - Treaty of Trianon: 4 June 1920
- Today part of: Romania
- Deva is the current name of the capital.

Hunyad (today mainly Hunedoara) was an administrative county (comitatus) of the Kingdom of Hungary, of the Eastern Hungarian Kingdom and of the Principality of Transylvania. Its territory is now in Romania in Transylvania. The capital of the county was Déva (present-day Deva).

== Geography ==
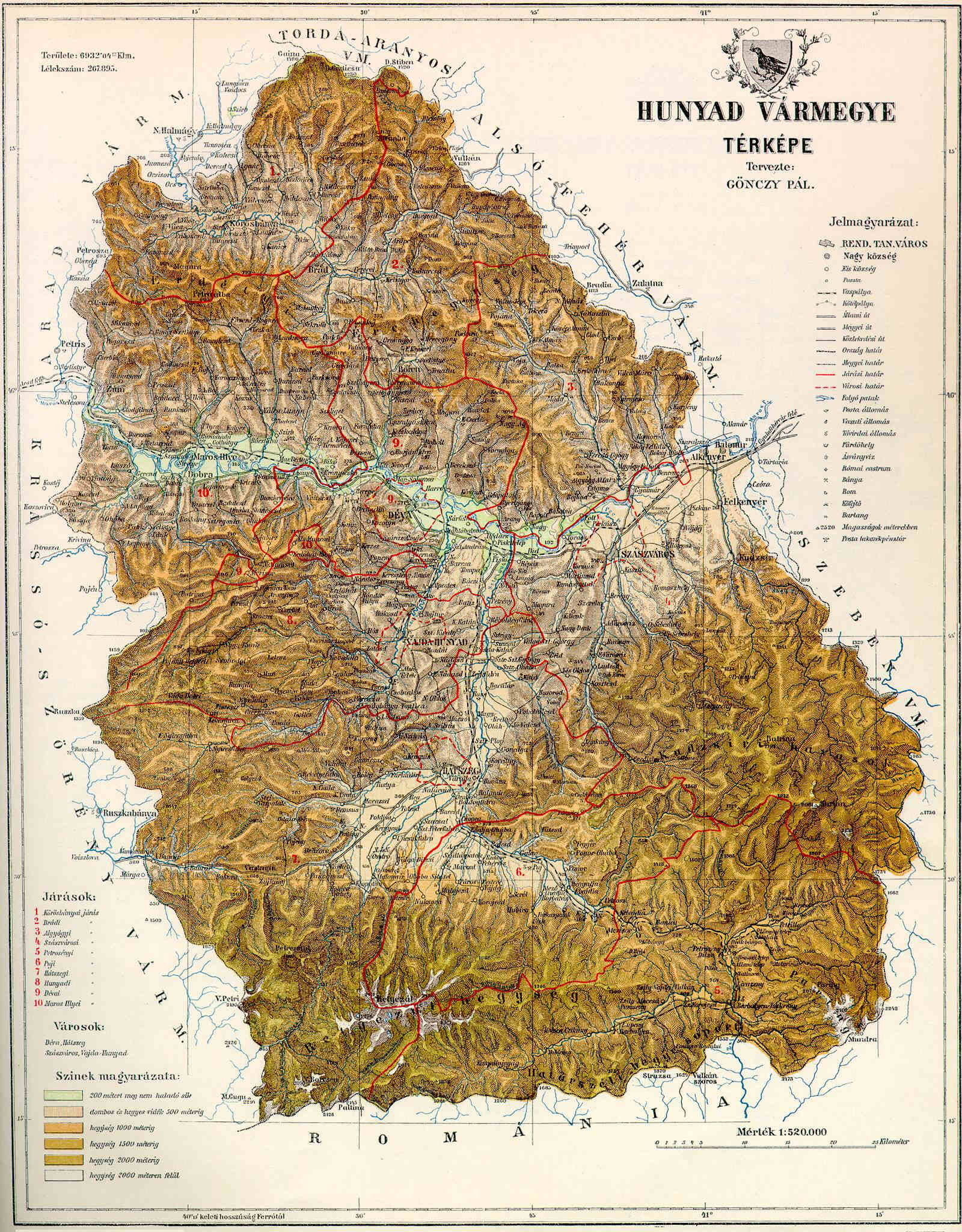
Map of Hunyad County, 1891.

After 1876, Hunyad county shared borders with Romania and the Hungarian counties Krassó-Szörény, Arad, Torda-Aranyos, Alsó-Fehér and Szeben. Its area was 7,809 km^{2} around 1910.

== Etymology ==
The toponym Hunyad most likely comes from the Hungarian huny verb, meaning 'to close' or 'to die'. According to linguist Géza Kuun, the name may keep the memory of the Huns.

== History ==
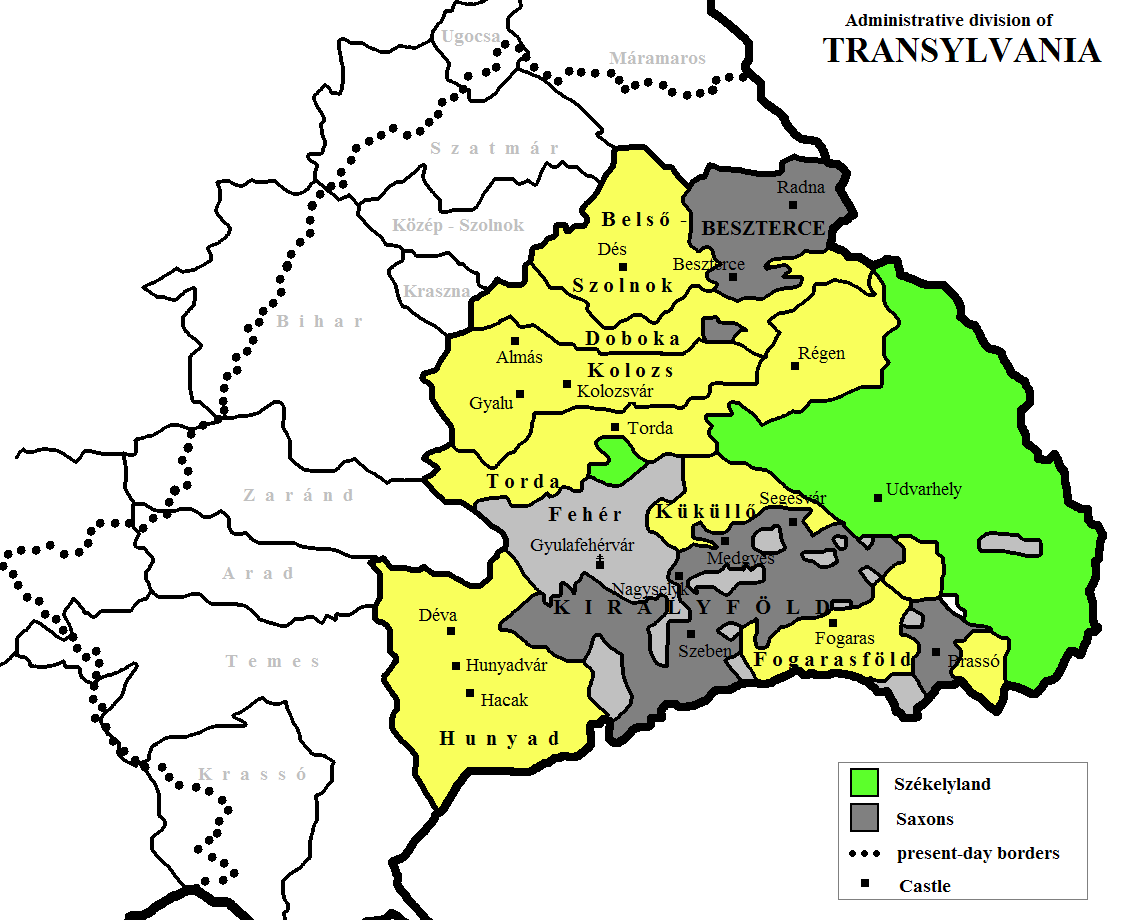
Hunyad county as an administrative unit in the early 16th century

Hunyad county in the Principality of Transylvania

The first known civilization living on the territory were the Scythian Agathyrsi and Sigynnae. Later the Dacians under their leader Burebista established solid control over the territory, but were conquered and massacred by the Roman Empire. Hunyad was part of Roman Dacia for a short time, but by the 3rd century it was occupied by the Goths, later by the Vandals and Gepids. The nomadic Avars conquered Transylvania in 567, and remained the ethnic majority even after the collapse of their khaganate. The Igech, Szerekes, Andos and Zeyk noble families are all of Avar origin, along with the name of the river Zsil.

Hunyad county was formed in the Middle Ages. It was first attested in 1265 as Hungnod by the Papal Quitrent Register.

The battle between John Hunyadi and Mezid Bey, fought within the Kingdom of Hungary: Older historiography places it at Szeben in Transylvania, while modern historiography locates the battle at the Iron Gate Pass (Vaskapu in Hungarian) in Hunyad county, southwestern Transylvania.

In 1876, when the administrative structure of Transylvania was changed, its territory was modified to include about two thirds of the former Zaránd County (Brád/Brad and Körösbánya/Baia de Criș districts) and the Saxon seat of Broos/Orăștie. In 1920, by the Treaty of Trianon, the county became part of Romania. Most of its territory lies in the present Romanian county Hunedoara; a strip in the east is now part of Alba and a strip in the west is now part of Caraș-Severin County (the commune Băuţar).

== Demographics ==
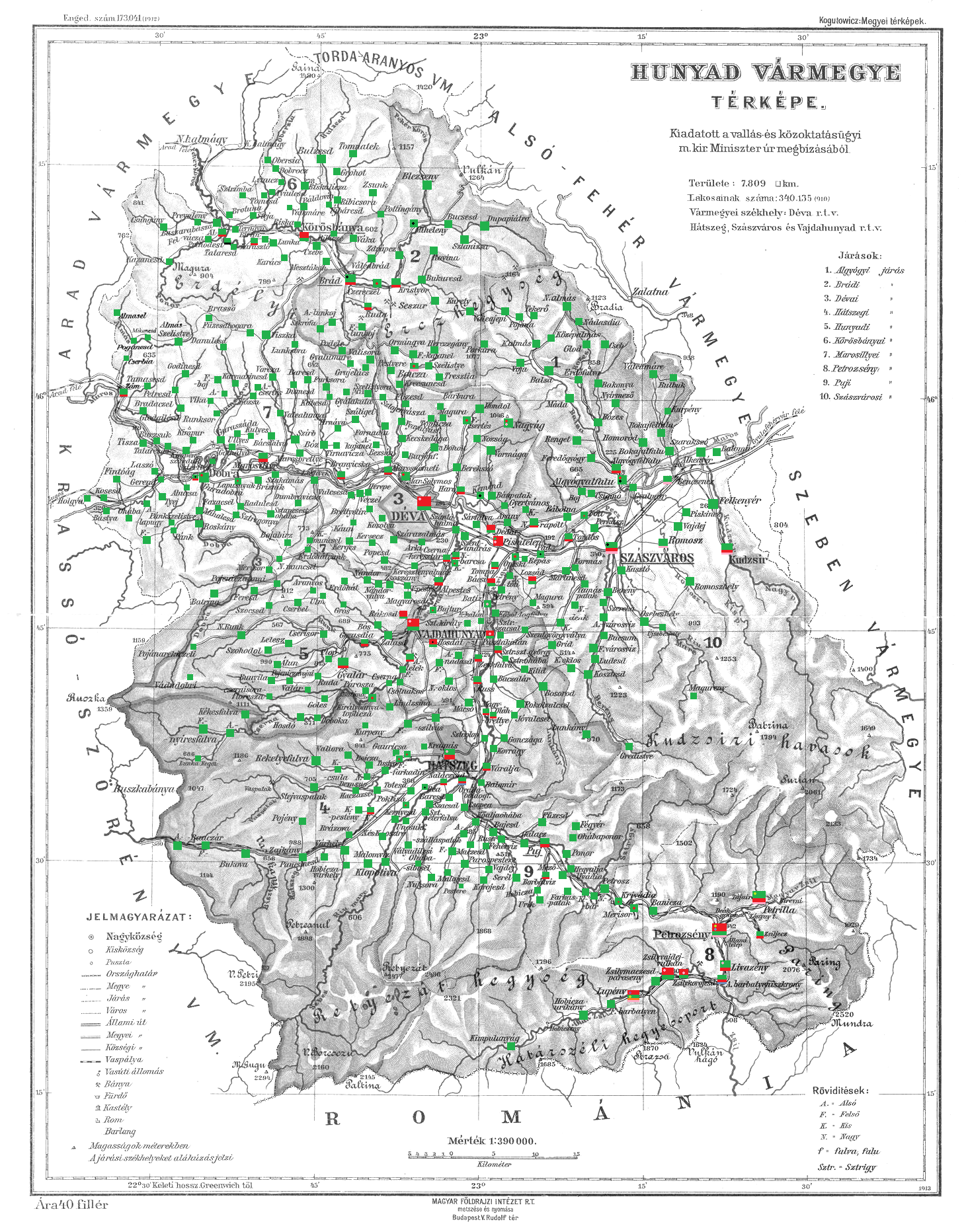
Ethnic map of the county with data of the 1910 census (see the key in the description).

Population by mother tongue (Note: Only linguistic communities > 1% are displayed.)
Census	Total	Romanian	Hungarian	German	Other or unknown
1880	248,464	217,414 (90.28%)	12,278 (5.10%)	6,968 (2.89%)	4,166 (1.73%)
1890	267,895	238,486 (89.02%)	17,167 (6.41%)	8,047 (3.00%)	4,195 (1.57%)
1900	303,838	257,013 (84.59%)	32,316 (10.64%)	9,189 (3.02%)	5,320 (1.75%)
1910	340,135	271,675 (79.87%)	52,720 (15.50%)	8,101 (2.38%)	7,639 (2.25%)

Population by religion (Note: Only religious communities > 1% are displayed.)
Census	Total	Eastern Orthodox	Greek Catholic	Roman Catholic	Calvinist	Jewish	Lutheran	Other or unknown
1880	248,464	177,725 (71.53%)	48,381 (19.47%)	11,883 (4.78%)	6,568 (2.64%)	1,996 (0.80%)	1,799 (0.72%)	112 (0.05%)
1890	267,895	190,018 (70.93%)	50,520 (18.86%)	15,121 (5.64%)	7,351 (2.74%)	2,470 (0.92%)	2,202 (0.82%)	213 (0.08%)
1900	303,838	204,350 (67.26%)	55,116 (18.14%)	24,993 (8.23%)	11,398 (3.75%)	4,056 (1.33%)	3,269 (1.08%)	656 (0.22%)
1910	340,135	217,425 (63.92%)	60,024 (17.65%)	34,668 (10.19%)	16,675 (4.90%)	5,679 (1.67%)	4,110 (1.21%)	1,554 (0.46%)

== Subdivisions ==
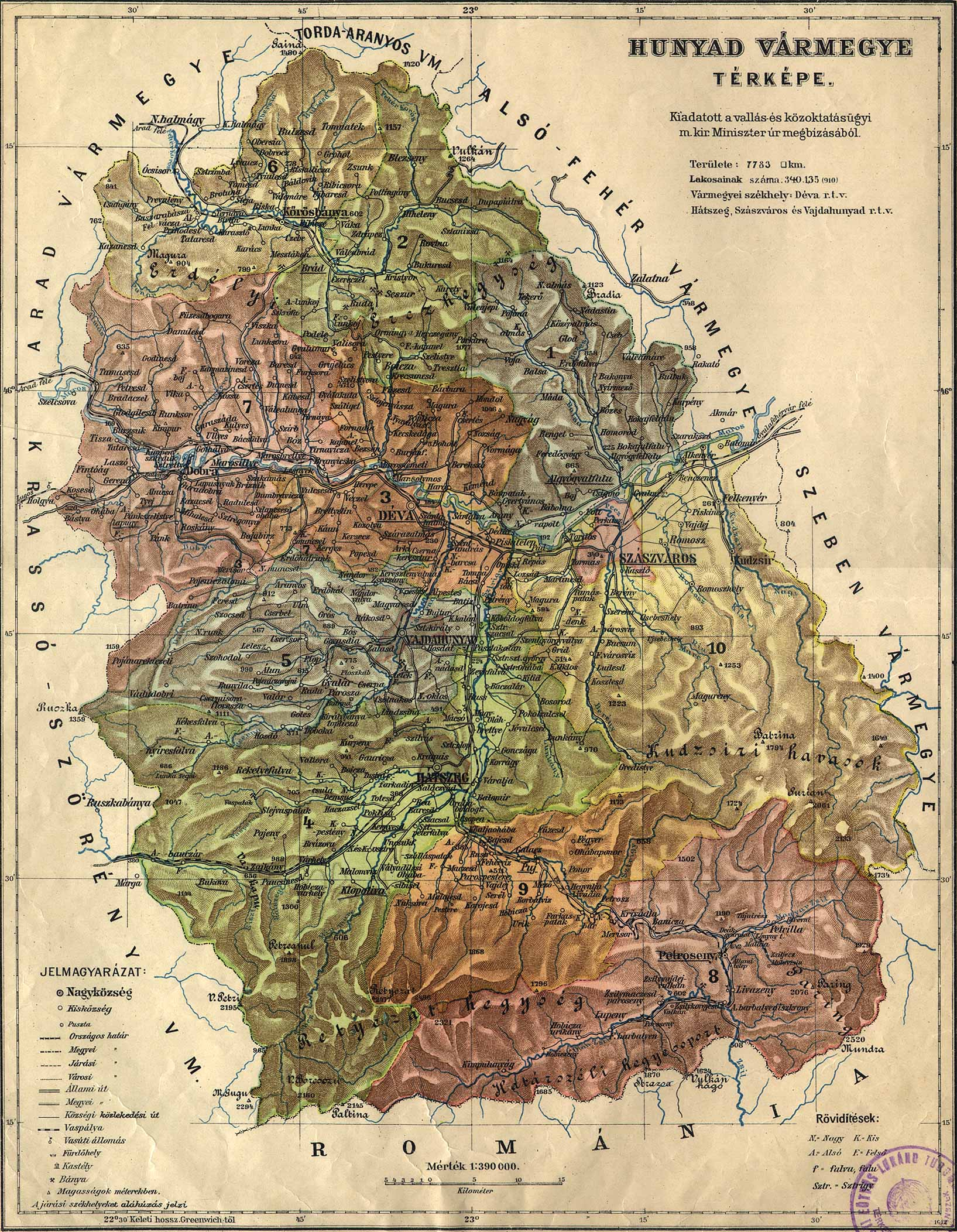
Administrative map of Hunyad County, 1910

In the early 20th century, the subdivisions of Hunyad County were:

Districts (járás)
District	Capital
Algyógy	Algyógyalfalu (now Geoagiu)
Brád	Brád (now Brad)
Déva	Déva (now Deva)
Hátszeg	Hátszeg (now Hațeg)
Kőrösbánya	Kőrösbánya (now Baia de Criș)
Marosillye	Marosillye (now Ilia)
Petrozsény	Petrozsény (now Petroșani)
Puj	Puj (now Pui)
Szászváros	Szászváros (now Orăștie)
Vajdahunyad	Vajdahunyad (now Hunedoara)
Urban districts (rendezett tanácsú város)
Déva (now Deva)
Hátszeg (now Hațeg)
Szászváros (now Orăștie)
Vajdahunyad (now Hunedoara)

== Sources ==
- Babinger, Franz (1978). Mehmed the Conqueror and His Time. Princeton University Press. ISBN 0-691-09900-6.
- Jefferson, John (2012). The Holy Wars of King Wladislas and Sultan Murad: The Ottoman-Christian Conflict from 1438–1444. Leiden: Brill Publishers. ISBN 978-90-04-21904-5.
- Pálosfalvi, Tamás (2018). From Nicopolis to Mohács: A History of Ottoman-Hungarian Warfare, 1389–1526. The Ottoman Empire and Its Heritage: Politics, Society and Economy 63. Leiden: Brill. ISBN 978-90-04-37565-9.
