= Mezid =

Ottoman general and statesman (died 1442)

Mezid Bey (died 1442) was an Ottoman general active in the Hungarian–Ottoman Wars under Murad II (r. 1421–44, 1446–51).

== Bibliography ==
- Jefferson, John (13 August 2012). The Holy Wars of King Wladislas and Sultan Murad: The Ottoman-Christian Conflict from 1438-1444. Brill. ISBN 9789004229259.
