= House of Talovac =

Croatian noble family

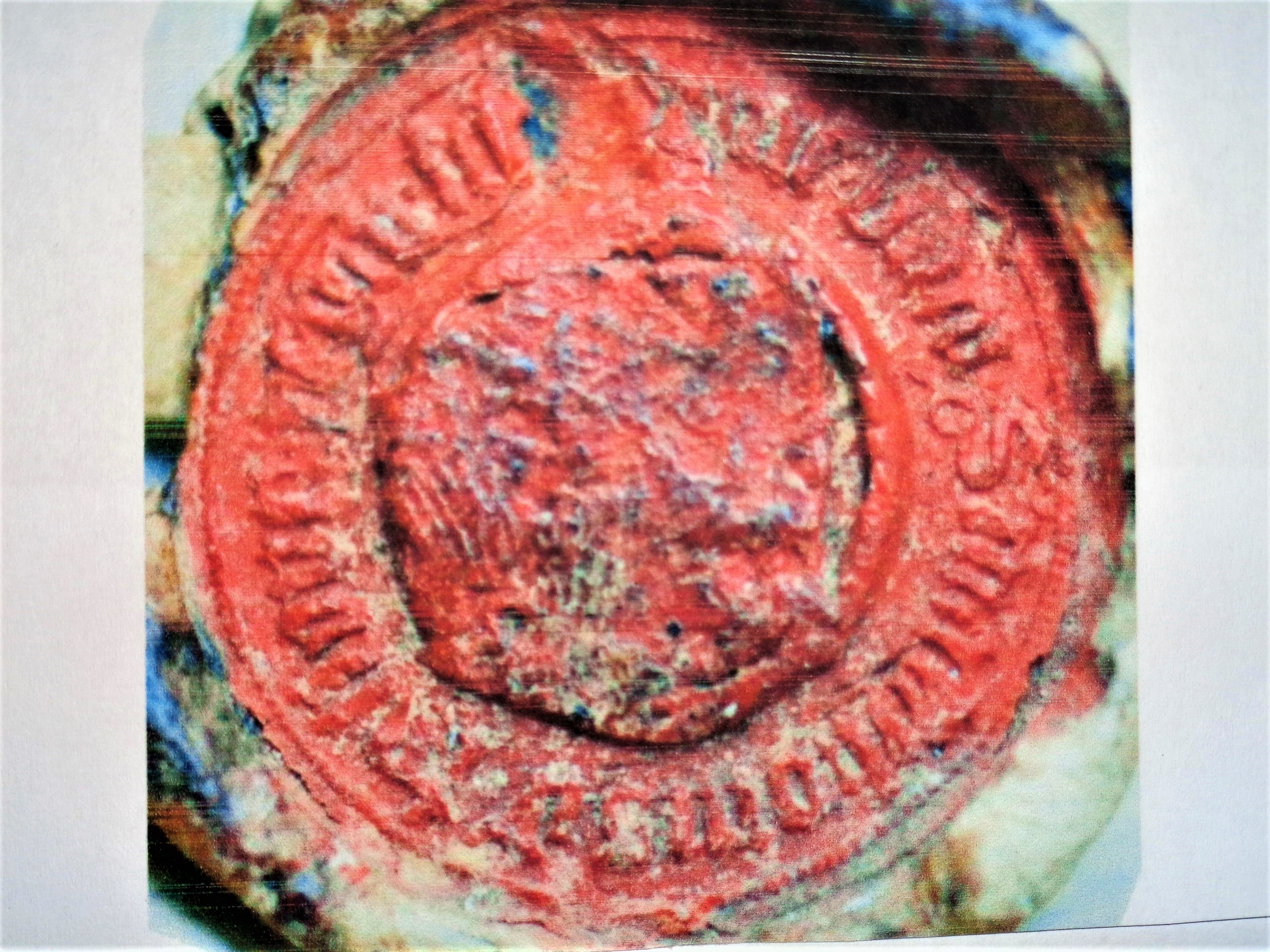
- Seal of Matko Talovac
- Country: Kingdom of Croatia; Kingdom of Hungary; Kingdom of Croatia in Habsburg Monarchy
- Origin: Korčula, Kingdom of Croatia
- Founded: 14th century
- Founder: Luka (Lucha)
- Current head: extinct (19th century)
- Estates: Topolovica, Đurđevac, Orljavac at Brestovac, Čazma and Voćin in Slavonia; Brčko, Srebrenik and Grabovac at Čelinac in Usora-Soli County (in modern-day B&H), as well as Kamičak, Knin, Klis, Sinj and Čačvina in southern Croatia
- Dissolution: 19th century

The House of Talovac (Croatian: Talovci; Hungarian: Tallóci) was a Croatian noble family, descending from the island of Korčula and reaching its peak in the 15th century in the Kingdom of Croatia, at that time in personal union with Hungary. The members of the family rose to high state, church or military offices, such as Ban (Viceroy) of Croatia and Dalmatia as well as Ban of Whole Slavonia, royal court chamberlain, bishop, župan and others.

== Family history ==
The oldest known ancestor of the family was Luka (‘’Lucha’’), a patrician from Korčula, mentioned at the end of the 14th century. He moved with his four sons (Matko, Franko, Petar and Ivan) to Dubrovnik, where his family was engaged in trade and acquired citizenship of the Republic of Dubrovnik. Their ships sailed to Constantinople and even farther, to the Black Sea. Some historians believe that members of the family met Sigismund of Luxemburg, King of Hungary and Croatia (who was in Dubrovnik after the Battle of Nicopolis) as early as 1396, while others believe it happened later, around 1427. In one way or another, they entered the service of the king and gradually received new titles, properties and castles from Sigismund for their loyalty.

=== Rise of the family ===
One of the properties that the family members received from the king in 1434 was Talovac (then spelled Thallowc, Tallowcz, Tallocz, Tallovec, Tallovez or Talloucz), which was located southwest of the town of Virovitica and after which the surname Talovac was formed. The property, including a large castle, was situated in the former Bjelovar-Križevci County. From the old castle, about 100×80 meters in size, there are only few remains in a forest today, several kilometers southeast of the similar-named present-day village of Topolovica (in the municipality of Veliki Grđevac).

In addition to the Talovac estate, the family also owned Đurđevac in Podravina, Orljavac at Brestovac, Čazma and Voćin in Slavonia, Brčko, Srebrenik and Grabovac at Čelinac in Usora-Soli County (in modern-day Bosnia and Herzegovina), Kamičak, Knin, Klis, Sinj, Omiš, Poljica and Čačvina in southern Croatia, as well as others.

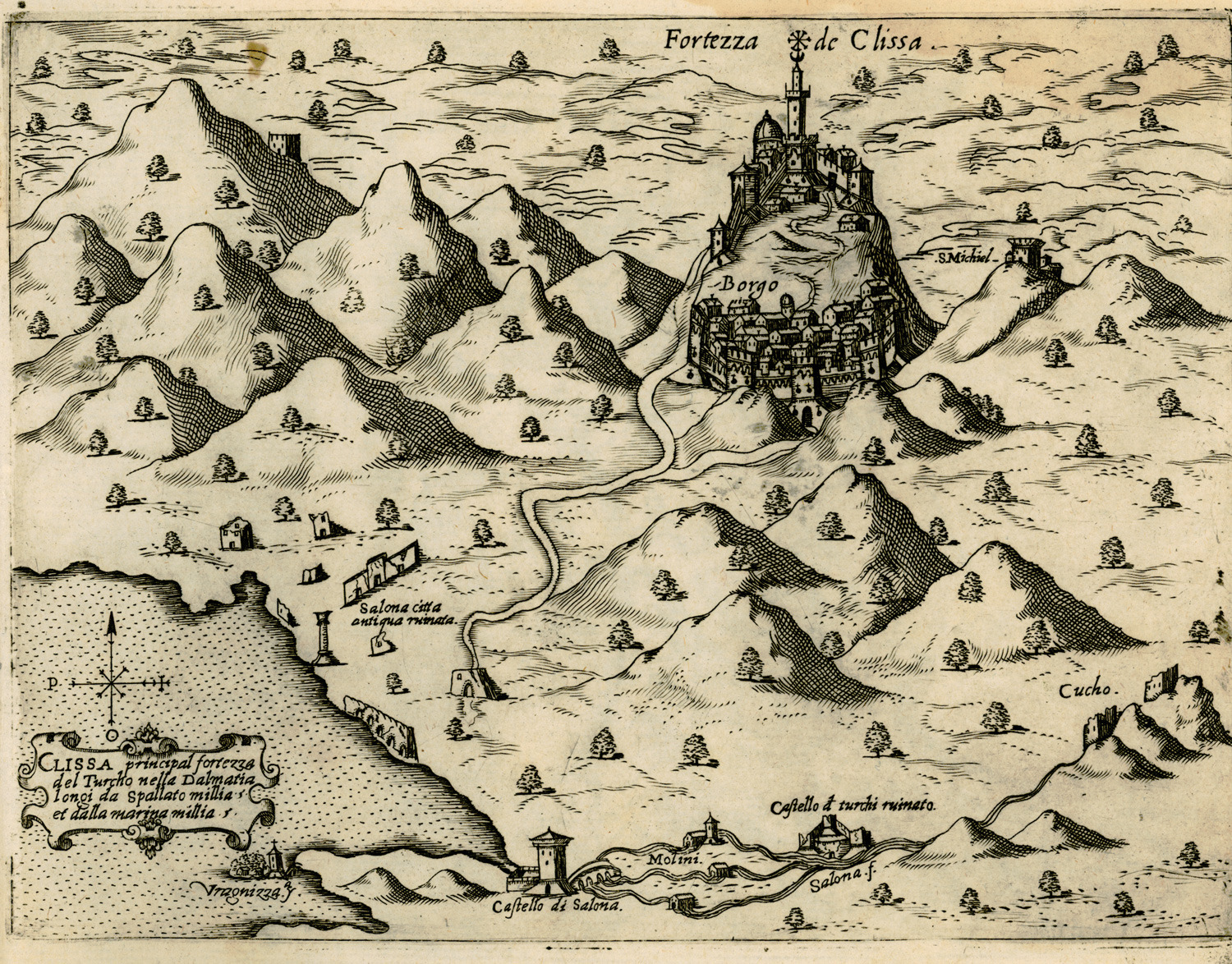
Klis was owned by members of the Talovac family in the 15th century

The Talovac brothers distinguished themselves in the military intervention in 1436 ordered by Sigismund, in which they captured the castles, fortresses and properties, previously belonging to the Nelipčić family, that had been taken over by the Croatian Ban (Viceroy) Ivan VI Frankopan against the will of the king. Earlier, prince Ivaniš Nelipić († 1434) had given his property to Ivan VI Frankopan as a dowry for his daughter Katarina, but Sigismund did not recognize it. The king gave the property to the Talovac family for their merits and awarded them the title "Princes of Cetina and Klis" (Croatian: Knezovi cetinski i kliški).

As the Talovac brothers lived in turbulent times of continual Turkish threat and expansion, they took part in numerous battles. Not only did they defend their possessions and other parts of the kingdom, but also fought in Kingdom of Bosnia and Despotate of Serbia. In Serbia they cooperated with despots Stefan Lazarević and Đurađ Branković.

=== Decline of the family ===
In conflicts against the Ottomans, Franko, one of the brothers, was killed as a partner of the Hungarian commander John Hunyadi in 1448 in the second battle of Kosovo. In 1453, after the death of Petar, who had been Ban of Croatia and Dalmatia, declined gradually the power, wealth and influence of the family. Many fought for its possessions: Stjepan Vukčić Kosača, Duke of Herzegovina, Stjepan Tomaš, King of Bosnia, Radivoj Ostojić, counter-king of Bosnia, Ulrich, powerful Count of Celje, John Hunyadi, Hungarian regent, Republic of Venice and others. However, the children of Matko (Pavao and Benedikt), Franko (Nikola, Ladislav, Matko II., Franjo and Anka) and Petar (Ivaniš and Stjepan) managed to preserve a certain part of the former family fortune.

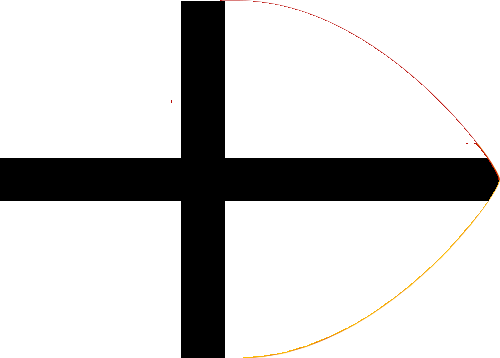
Flag of Franko Talovac in the battle of Varna (1444)

Ivaniš and Stjepan, Petar's sons, who were minors at the time of their father's death, could not keep their lands in southern Croatia and moved to Slavonia around 1460. The members of the family who lived in Slavonia began to call themselves Banić (Hungarian Bánffy) in the second half of the 15th century, as they were sons of Ban.

At the beginning of the 16th century, the descendants of Franko and Petar lived in Slavonia. Juraj, Franko's grandson, was appointed deputy Župan of the Vuka County in 1527. His son Baltazar became a captain in the service of King Ferdinand I of Habsburg and took part in the siege of Buda (1530). He received new possessions in western Hungary. Petar's son Ivaniš and grandson Gabriel were mentioned as owners of Talovac Castle in 1495. This branch of the family died out in the 16th century.

In 1526 the members of the Talovac family were raised to the peerage as barons. When the Ottomans conquered almost all of Slavonia in the 1530s and 1540s, the members of the lineage moved to western Hungary. Franko's descendants lived there on their estates until the 19th century.

== Notable members ==
The following members of the family were most notable:

- Matko, Ban of Slavonia from 1435 and Ban of Croatia and Dalmatia from 1436 until his death in 1444 or 1445, royal Chamberlain (from 1434), Count of Hungarian-held Keve and Castellan of Nándorfehérvár (modern-day Belgrade), Diocesan administrator (Steward) of the Diocese of Zagreb (1433-1438) and the Priory of Vrana (1434-1439)
- Franko, Ban of Severin, Count of Temes (from 1437), Castellan of Nándorfehérvár, Diocesan administrator (Steward) of the Diocese of Zagreb (from 1433)
- Petar, Ban of Croatia and Dalmatia (1437-1452), Diocesan administrator (Steward) of the Diocese of Zagreb (1438-1440)
- Ivan, prior of Vrana (1439-1445), Castellan of Nándorfehérvár (1440)
- Juraj, (grandson of Franko), deputy Župan of the Vuka County (from 1527)

== See also ==
- List of rulers of Croatia
- Croatia in personal union with Hungary
- History of Croatia
- Bjelovar-Križevci County

== Sources ==
- Dugački, Vlatka; Regan, Krešimir (2018). "Rod Talovaca ili Talovačkih i njihova ostavština u Bjelovarsko-bilogorskoj županiji" [The Talovac Nobility and their legacy in the Bjelovar-Bilogora County]. Papers of the Institute for Scientific Research and Artistic Work in Bjelovar (in Croatian). 12. Croatian Academy of Sciences and Arts Scientific and Art Institute in Bjelovar – via Hrčak - Portal of Croatian scientific and professional journals.
- "Talovci". Croatian Encyclopedia. Zagreb: Miroslav Krleža Lexicographical Institute.
- Perojević, Marko (1937). "Talovci - Princes of Cetina and Klis". Kalendar. HKD Napredak. Archived from the original on 2017-08-20 – via Infobiro Beta - Mediacentar, Sarajevo.
