= Raid on Kruševac =

Battle between the army of the Kingdom of Hungary and the Ottoman Empire

- Part of the Hungarian–Ottoman Wars
Date	1437
Location	Kruševac, Serbia
Result	Hungarian victory

Belligerents
Kingdom of Hungary	Ottoman Empire

Commanders and leaders
Franko Talovac; János Ország; János Marczaly	Unknown

The Raid on Kruševac in 1437 was the first of several Hungarian military campaigns aimed at disrupting Ottoman raiding networks in the Balkans, later undertaken as crusading expeditions and offensive anti-Ottoman campaigns organized by John Hunyadi.

== Background ==
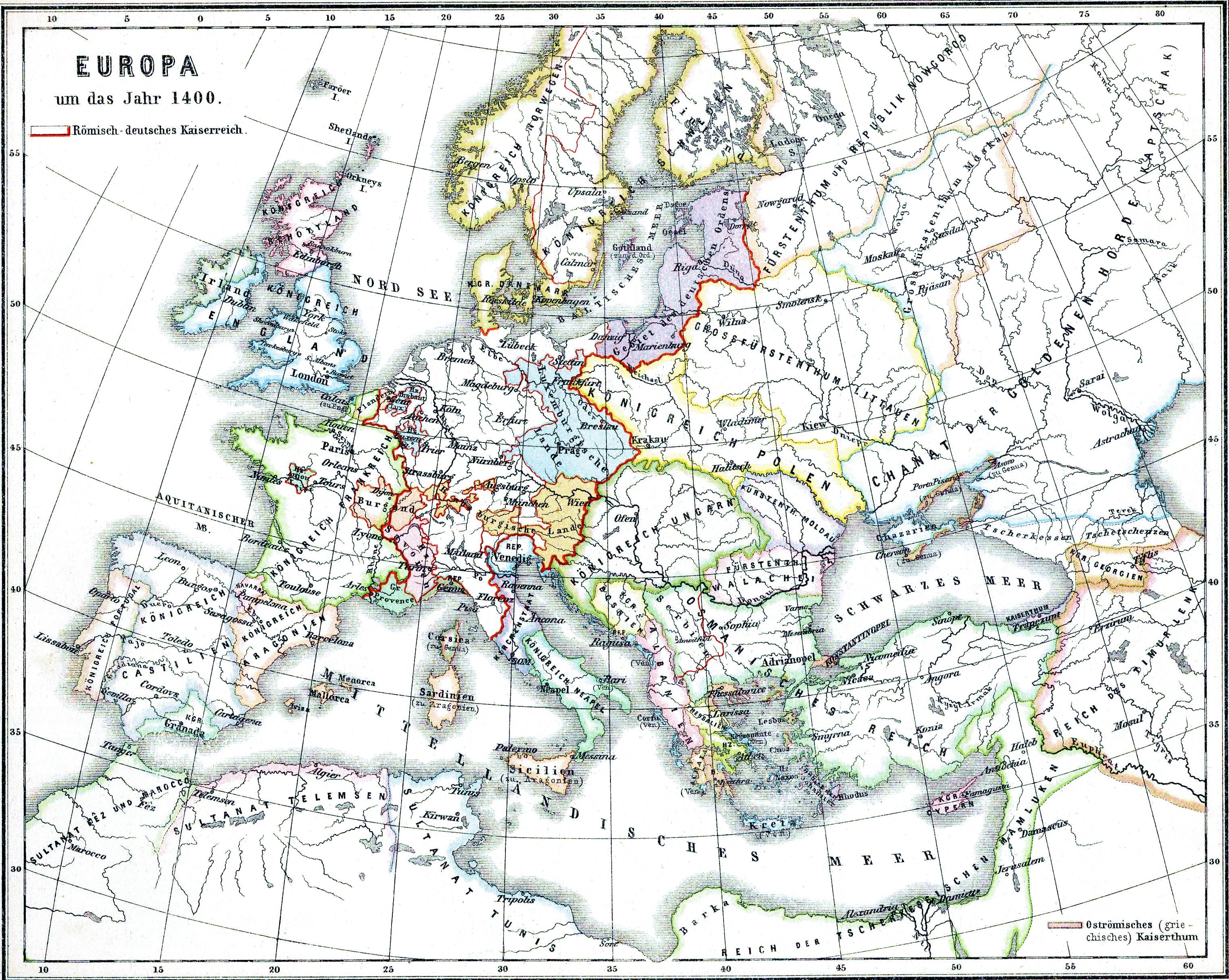
Europe in 1400

King Sigismund of Hungary (reigned 1387–1437) pursued an effective, decades-long, fundamentally defensive policy in the Hungarian–Ottoman Wars. Following the defeat at Nicopolis in 1396, King Sigismund developed a new defense strategy. He aimed to create a buffer zone along the border between the Kingdom of Hungary and the Ottoman Empire, and also strengthened the existing system of banates on the southern border, which was closely linked to the developing system of border fortresses.

== The raid ==
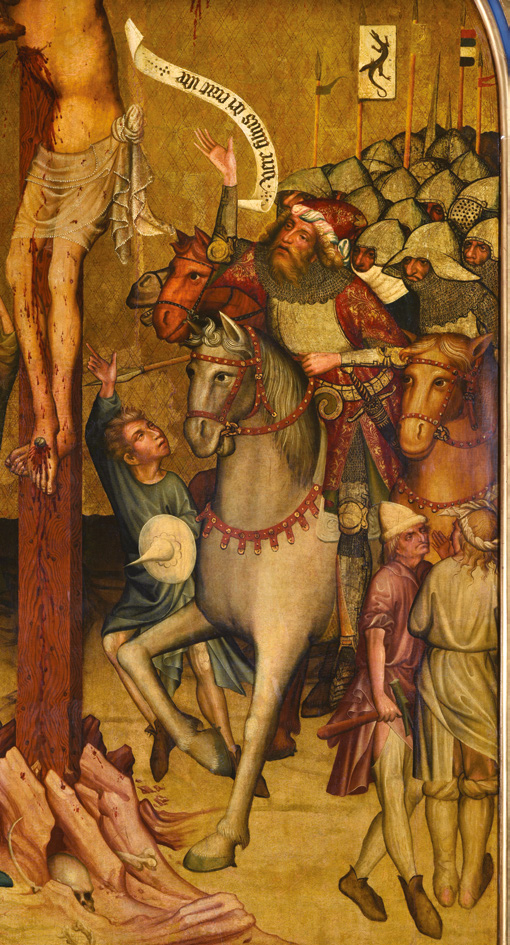
Calvary altar with the representation of King Sigismund of Hungary, 1427

King Sigismund ordered Franko Tallóci, John Ország, and John Marczaly to lead a contingent of Hungarian, Polish, and Czech soldiers in a raid against Turkish territory in the summer of 1437. Ali Bey, the marcher lord of Vidin, assembled an Ottoman force to pursue and attack the Hungarian raiders. Due in part to the valiant and decisive actions of Franko Tallóci, the Ottoman force was routed, and the Hungarians pursued the retreating Ottomans, inflicting casualties where possible. The raid on Kruševac was the largest and most successful Hungarian incursion in many years. It penetrated more than 100 kilometers into enemy territory, inflicted multiple defeats, and crippled the Ottoman river fleet. The raid had two significant consequences. First, it marked the first major offensive undertaken by the Hungarians in years, demonstrating the potential effectiveness of such operations. Second, it provoked the anger of the Sultan at a time when other factors were already pushing the Ottomans toward the annexation of Serbia and the conquest of Hungary.

== Aftermath ==
The raid on Kruševac was the first of several Hungarian military campaigns aimed at disrupting Ottoman raiding networks in the Balkans, later undertaken as crusading expeditions and offensive anti-Ottoman campaigns organized by John Hunyadi. Although these deep incursions into Ottoman territory were widely celebrated, they did not provide effective protection for the southern frontiers of the Kingdom of Hungary. Despite widespread destruction in Serbia, Bulgaria, and Bosnia, Ottoman power structures remained largely unaffected, as the affected areas could be quickly repopulated with settlers from other parts of the empire. The loss of naval infrastructure and artillery likewise did not hinder the empire's continuous raidings of its neighbours, as evidenced by the campaigns of 1438–1439. In late summer 1437, Sigismund ordered a general mobilization under the command of Palatine Lawrence Hédervári, citing Murad's determination to personally avenge the previous defeat. The Hungarian raid on Kruševac played a key role in provoking the major Ottoman campaign of 1438.

Six months after the Kruševac raid, Sigismund died in late 1437.

== Sources ==
- Jefferson, John (2012). The Holy Wars of King Wladislas and Sultan Murad: The Ottoman-Christian Conflict from 1438–1444. Leiden: Brill Publishers. ISBN 978-90-04-21904-5.
- Pálosfalvi, Tamás (2018). From Nicopolis to Mohács: A History of Ottoman-Hungarian Warfare, 1389–1526. The Ottoman Empire and Its Heritage: Politics, Society and Economy 63. Leiden: Brill. ISBN 978-90-04-37565-9.
