= Ivan Talovac =

Croato-Hungarian nobleman

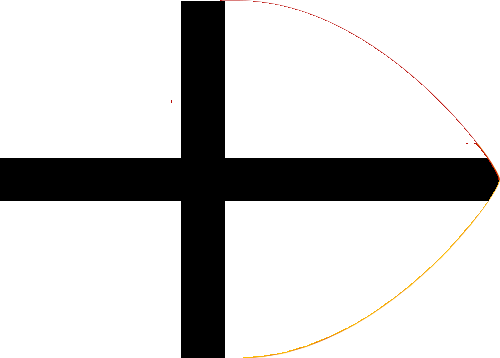
- Died: 1445; Pakrac (?)
- Other names: Joannes Talocz, Thallöczy
- Occupation: prior of Vrana (1439-1445)

Ivan Talovac (Hungarian: Tallóci János) was a 15th-century Croatian nobleman, a member of the Talovac noble family. He served as prior of Vrana from 1439 to 1445 (until his death), as the first governor of Pakrac in Slavonia, and was a member of the Order of the Knights of Saint John.

== Family ==
Ivan Talovac was a member of the Talovac family who were Hungarian vassals and an influential family in the Croatian region of Cetina. He was of Croatian origin. His brother was Matija or Matko Talovac, who served at the Serbian court of Stefan Lazarević who was a Hungarian vassal at that time.

== Military officer ==
Talovac became castellan of Nándorfehérvár, then Hungarian-held modern-day Belgrade, in 1440 at the time his brother Matko served as Ban of Slavonia (from 1435). His brother Franko Talovac (Hungarian: Frank Thallóczi alias de Ragusio) succeeded him in the position of castellan of Nándorfehérvár. Another brother of him, Petar Talovac, was also Ban of Croatia. It is possible that Talovac managed to achieve the position of the governor of Nándorfehérvár thanks to the connections of Talovac's family at the Hungarian court, besides his own merits.

In 1440 Talovac was a successful military officer as the commander of Hungarian forces mostly consisting of local Serbs during the Ottoman siege of Belgrade. Besides Talovac's forces (around 500 men) from Croatia, the garrison was enforced with Czech and Italian mercenaries who were archers. The local Serb population also assisted defenders Ivan was not immediately aware of the size of the Ottoman forces and initially had intention to defeat them on the open battlefield. When he went out of the castle and realized that his forces are heavily outnumbered by the Ottomans, he retreated to the city. During this battle rifles were used against the Ottomans for the first time in history by Talovac's forces.

== Later career ==
After 1441 Talovac was župan of the Dubica Župa. In December 1442 he was mentioned as count of Cetina in Croatia. Talovac was also the prior of Vrana, a very important position, in period between 1439 and 1445. He was killed in a battle in 1445.

== Sources ==
- Čubrilović, Vasa (1974). Istorija Beograda: Stari, srednji i novi vek. Prosveta.
- Stojković, Sreten J. (1893). Na lepom srpskom Dunavu, od Beograda do Radujevca. Izdanje knjižare D. M. Corića.
- Поповић, Душан Ј (1964). Beograd kroz vekove. Туристичка штампа.
- Elezović, Gliša; Škrivanić, Gavro A. (1956). Kako su Turci posle više opsada zauzeli Beograd. Naučna knjiga.
- Sakcinski, Ivan (1886). Priorat Vranski sa Vitezi Templari i Hospitalci Sv. Ivana u Hrvatskoj. Tisak Dioničke Tiskare.
- Zagrebu, Hrvatsko archeološko društvo u (1911). Viestnik Hrvatskoga arheološkoga društva.
