= Matko Talovac =

Croatian nobleman, Ban of Slavonia

- Born: late 14th century Korčula, Kingdom of Croatia
- Died: after 20 November 1444; Prodavić, Slavonia
- Occupation(s): Ban of Slavonia, Ban of Croatia

Matko Talovac (Latin: Mathkoni de Thallowcz, Hungarian: Tallóci Matkó) or Matija Talovac, was a Croatian nobleman, a member of the Talovac noble family. He served as Ban (Viceroy) of Slavonia from 1435 and Ban of Croatia from 1436, until his death in 1444 or 1445.

== Family ==
Matko Talovac was born in the island of Korčula at the end of the 14th century. About that time or in the early 15th century, the Talovac family moved to the city of Dubrovnik. In contemporary sources, Matko is also called "Matko of Dubrovnik" (Mathico de Aragouse). The Talovac family was influential in the region of Cetina in the 15th century.

Matko's brother Petar Talovac was the ban of Croatia and Dalmatia from 1438 to 1453. His second brother Franko (Franjo) was the ban of Severin, prefect of Temeš and captain of Nándorfehérvár (modern-day Belgrade). His third brother Ivan was the prior of Vrana (1439-1445). Accepting the royal gifts of lands, the Talovac brothers were for a time the most powerful lords in all of the Croatian lands. Their rule extended from Nándorfehérvár to Senj and from the Drava to the Neretva.

== Service ==
Matko served at the court of Serbian Despot Stefan Lazarević. He was in his service from 1416, according to a contemporary document from Dubrovnik. After Stefan's death in 1427, he joined Hungarian and Croatian King Sigismund and was in 1430 appointed Count of Keve and Castellan of Hungarian-held Belgrade. He was also given control of the forts of Srebrenik, Grabovac, and Brčko, in the region of Usora. Matko participated in a number of battles against the Ottoman Empire in Serbia. In service to Emperor Sigmund he was named the steward of the Zagreb bishopric in 1433. In the following year, he was named prior of Vrana, a title he held until 1439.

Matko was appointed ban of all Slavonia in October 1435, and Ban of Croatia and Dalmatia in May 1436. He held the title of Croatian ban together with Stephen III Frankopan from 1436–1437, with Petar Talovac from 1437–1444, and with Petar and Franko Talovac until his death. His brothers Ivan and Franko succeeded him on the position of castellan of Nándorfehérvár.

He held land in Topolovica (old sources call it Thallowch, Talloca, Tallowcz, Tallocz, Tallovec, Tallovez or Talloucz), given to him by Sigismund from which he took the name Talovac. His rule came at a time of rapturous Ottoman incursions into Croatian territory and internal fighting of feudal lords.

The exact date of Matko's death is not known. He probably died in late 1444 or the beginning of 1445, in his fort of Prodavić (modern-day Virje in Croatia).

== Sources ==
- Čubrilović, Vasa (1974). Istorija Beograda: Stari, srednji i novi vek. Prosveta.
- Dugački, Vlatka; Regan, Krešimir (2018). "Rod Talovaca ili Talovačkih i njihova ostavština u Bjelovarsko-bilogorskoj županiji" [The family of Talovac and their legacy in Bjelovar-Bilogora County]. Papers of the Institute for Scientific Research and Artistic Work in Bjelovar (in Croatian) (12). Leksikografski zavod Miroslav Krleža: 139–157.
- Elezović, Gliša; Škrivanić, Gavro A. (1956). Kako su Turci posle više opsada zauzeli Beograd. Naučna knjiga.

Preceded by Hermann II of Celje	Ban of Slavonia; 1435–1444/1445	Succeeded by Frederick II of Celje; Ulrich II of Celje
Preceded by Stephen III Frankopan	Ban of Croatia; 1436–1444/1445	Succeeded by Petar Talovac
