= Francesco Antonio Bertucci =

- Born: Franjo Antun Brtučević; Hvar
- Died: Autumn 1626
- Other names: Bertuzzi, Bartuccius
- Occupations: Dalmatian friar, Knight Hospitaller, adventurer and an agent of the Holy Roman Empire
- Known for: gaining support of the Holy Roman Empire and Pope for his plans to organise the Holy League against the Ottomans

Francesco Antonio Bertucci (Serbo-Croatian: Franjo Antun Brtučević, fl. 1595), was a Dalmatian Capuchin and Knight Hospitaller of disputed origin who served as the titular prior of the commandry of the Order at the monastery located in Vrana, a town in present-day Croatia. He is known for his remarkably consistent efforts to turn Habsburg-Ottoman Long War into crusade of Christian alliance against the Ottomans.

Originally from the town of Hvar, Bertucci was a relative of the Dalmatian poets Jerolim (Gerolamo) and Hortenzije Brtučević (Ortensio Bertucci).

Bertucci was a member of the Holy League of Pope Clement VIII.

In 1592, Bertucci was in Rome where he received the Pope's order to catch and kill Marco Sciarra, the leader of rebels, which he did in April 1593.

== Plans for Anti-Ottoman crusade ==
Bertucci was at the heart of 1596 plans for the uprising in the eastern Adriatic region. According to some suggestions, the main reason for his anti-Ottoman activities were his plans to recapture the Priory of Vrana from Ottomans.

The contemporary Venetian sources and later sources that rely on them considered Bertucci as papal agent, while some other sources simply considered him as an adventurer who managed to achieve access to the Pope through emperor Ferdinand II. Elisabeth Springer, an Austrian scholar who studied the career of Bertucci, emphasize that Bertucci's earlier attempts to access the pope (before he gained support of Ferdinand II) aimed to convince him to inspire general anti-Ottoman uprising in the Balkans and organize an anti-Ottoman crusade (Holy League), were not successful. Springer further concluded that Bertucci was actually an agent of the Holy Roman Empire who initially gained the support of Archduke Ferdinand of Graz and later Emperor Ferdinand II and members of his court, for his anti-Ottoman plans. According to Bertuccis plan, the rebels (including Uskoks) would first capture Klis, Herceg Novi and Scutari from the Ottomans. That would trigger a large Ottoman naval expedition into the north Adriatic and draw Venetians, who otherwise refused to join the crusade, to join the alliance against the Ottomans.

In the early 1590s the seat of anti-Ottoman conspiracy of Bertucci and his associates was in Ragusa. According to some rumours, the Republic of Ragusa was ready to expel them because the Ottomans offered them some benefits if they did. The seat of anti-Ottoman conspiracy was then moved to Split.

In 1595 Bertucci tried to convince the Metropolitan of Cetinje Rufim Njeguš to accept union with Catholic Church.

== Battle of Klis ==
On 7 April 1596 a group of Uskoks who were Habsburg citizens and about thirty Venetian citizens attacked the Ottoman-held fortress of Klis (Battle of Klis (1596)) and captured it with the support of some members of the Ottoman garrison. The Habsburgs and Papal State joint troops, led personally by Antonio Bertucci, were sent to reinforce weak Christian garrison in the newly captured fortress. The releaf troops were supplied from the port of Senj. The Ottoman forces first defeated reinforcement troops and then reoccupied Klis. The Habsburg general who was supposed to lead relief troops blamed Bertucci for this defeat. Bertucci was captured during this battle and briefly held in Ottoman captivity until he was ransomed. This defeat had a negative influence on his further attempts to convince Balkan Christian rulers to rebel against the Ottomans.

== Sources ==
- Klaić, Vjekoslav (1973). Povjest Hrvata: od najstarijih vremena do svršetka xix. stoljeća. Tisak i naklada knjižare L. Hartmana.
- Krokar, James P. (1973). "New Means to an Old End: Early Modern Maps in the Service of an Anti-Ottoman Crusade". Imago Mundi. 60: 23–38. doi:10.1080/03085690701669277. S2CID 162294068.
- zadruga (1993). Istorija srpskog naroda: knj. Od najstarijih vremena do Maričke bitke (1371). Srpska književna zadruga.
