= Franko Talovac =

Croatian nobleman

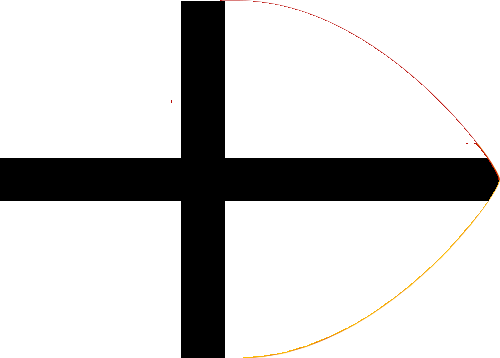
- Flag of Talovac at the battle of Varna

Ban of Severin
- Reign: 1436–1439
- Predecessor: Ladislaus Hagymás of Beregszó
- Successor: John Hunyadi, Jr.
- Known for: Diocesan administrator (Steward) of the Diocese of Zagreb and Archdiocese of Kalocsa (from 1433); Ban of Severin (1436–1439); Count of Temes (from 1437); Castellan of Nándorfehérvár
- Born: late 14th century Korčula, Kingdom of Croatia (now Croatia)
- Died: 1448; Kosovo field, Medieval Serbia (now Kosovo)
- Residence: Topolovica, Bjelovar-Bilogora County,
- Spouse: Jelena Jakšić of Kuželj
- Issue: Nikola, Ladislav, Matko II., Franjo and Anka

Franko Talovac or Franjo Talovac (in medieval sources: Francho Thallowcz, Tallocz, Tallovec; Hungarian: Frank Tallóci; born late 14th century – died 1448) was a Croatian nobleman, a member of the Talovac noble family. He held the dignity of Ban of Severin (1436–1439), Diocesan administrator (Steward) of the Diocese of Zagreb and Archdiocese of Kalocsa (from 1433), Count of Temes (from 1437) and Castellan of Nándorfehérvár in the associated kingdoms Hungary and Croatia.

== Biography ==
=== Family ===
Franko Talovac was born in Korčula (at the time within Kingdom of Croatia in personal union with Hungary, following the 1358 Treaty of Zadar) in the late 14th century as the son of Luka (‘’Lucha’’), a patrician from Korčula. He moved with his father and three brothers, Matko, Petar (Perko) and Ivan to Dubrovnik, where they were engaged in trade and eventually acquired citizenship of the Republic of Dubrovnik. Later he moved with his brothers to the north of Croatia.

He married Jelena Jakšić of Kuželj and they had five children (Nikola, Ladislav, Matko II, Franjo II and Anka) who succeeded him and managed to preserve a certain part of the family fortune.

=== Early life and military career ===
He entered the service of king Sigismund of Luxemburg and received new titles, estates and castles from him for his loyalty and military service, which he shared with his brothers. One of those estates was Talovac (then spelled Thallowc, Tallowcz, Tallocz, Tallovec, Tallovez or Talloucz), which was located southwest of the town of Virovitica in the former Bjelovar-Križevci County, several kilometers southeast of the similar-named present-day village of Topolovica (in the municipality of Veliki Grđevac).

In 1436 he became Ban of Severin (territory in present-day Romania) and from 1437 he carried the title of Count of Temes. In the same year he was appointed Castellan of Nándorfehérvár (present-day Belgrade in Serbia) along with his brother Ivan.

In his military career he distinguished himself in the Ottoman wars taking part in many battles, e.g. the Siege of Smederevo in 1437 and the siege of Nándorfehérvár. When the Ottomans besieged the latter from May to October 1440, he successfully commanded, together with his brother Ivan, the defense of the castle, so that besiegers eventually lifted the siege. Franco also defended some other strongholds and repulsed the Ottoman attacks, for instance, on Kevevára and Macsó, which significantly relieved the defence of Nándorfehérvár and some other strongholds.

Together with his eldest brother Matko, he was in 1433 appointed Diocesan administrator (Steward) of the Diocese of Zagreb and Archdiocese of Kalocsa.

=== Later life and death ===
Ottoman Campaigns of John Hunyadi, 1440–1456

In the dynastic struggles in 1440–1443, which took place between Vladislaus I Jagiellon and Ladislaus V Habsburg (Posthumous), Franko as well as his brothers sided with the former. But the crushing defeat suffered at the battle of Varna and the death of king Vladislav I in 1444 marked the beginning of a period of weakening family power. Franko took part in the battle along with his brother Petar and both survived. But the eldest brother Matko fell ill and soon died at the end of 1444 or beginning of 1445, while the younger brother Ivan was killed in a battle in Slavonia in 1445.

In the Serbian campaign 1443-1444 he took part in several conflicts against the Ottoman Empire. The brothers Franko and Petar distinguished themselves in the battles of Niš and Zlatica in 1443 as well as in the battle of Kunovica near Niška Banja at the beginning of 1444. In another campaign of the Hungarian army against the Turks, supreme commander John Hunyadi engaged Franko to participate in the second battle of Kosovo in 1448. Talovac commanded Hunjadi's military reserve in the battle. During the long and bloody three-day battle he lost his life.

== See also ==
- Croatia in personal union with Hungary
- List of Bans of Severin
