= Čačvina =

Settlement in Split-Dalmatia County, Croatia

- Settlement
- Interactive map of Čačvina
- Location within Croatia
- Coordinates: 43°36′43″N 16°47′20″E
- Country: Croatia
- County: Split-Dalmatia
- City: Trilj

Area
  - Total: 8.1 km^{2} (3.1 sq mi)

Population (2021)
  - Total: 59
  - Density: 7.3/km^{2} (19/sq mi)
- Time zone: UTC+1 (CET)
  - Summer (DST): UTC+2 (CEST)
- Postal code: 21240 Trilj
- Area code: +385 (0)21

Čačvina is a settlement in the City of Trilj in Croatia. In 2021, its population was 59.

== Geography ==
Čačvina is located on the edge of a small karst field at an altitude of 683 meters along the Trilj–Kamensko road that leads to Bosnia and Herzegovina. Its economy relies on agriculture, specifically sheep, cattle, and pig breeding.

== History ==
A nearby medieval Fortress of Čačvina developed along the ancient route connecting the Cetina region with southwestern Bosnia. Remains of a 1st-century ancient road are also in the vicinity. The Čačvina area was under the House of Šubić until 1322. The fortress on the left bank of the Cetina is mentioned from the mid-14th century under the Nelipčić family. From 1435, it was held by the Frankopans, from 1436 by the Talovci, and from 1459 by Herceg Stjepan Vukčić Kosača, who fought King Tomaš for it. The Ottomans controlled Čačvina from 1513 to 1718 as part of Sanjak of Herzegovina. It then became part of Venetian Dalmatia, and abandoned in the mid-18th century. The fortress was demolished during French rule in 1808.

== Demographics ==
Čačvina: Population trends 1857–2021
v

population	124		247	267	326	302		140	279	298	291	288	260	155	98	93	59
	1857	1869	1880	1890	1900	1910	1921	1931	1948	1953	1961	1971	1981	1991	2001	2011	2021

Sources: Croatian Bureau of Statistics publications

== Landmarks ==
Čačvina Fortress is a fortification at an altitude of 700 metres that guarded approach to interior Dalmatia from Bosnia since prehistory. The 18th-century Church of All Saints lies at the base of the fortress.

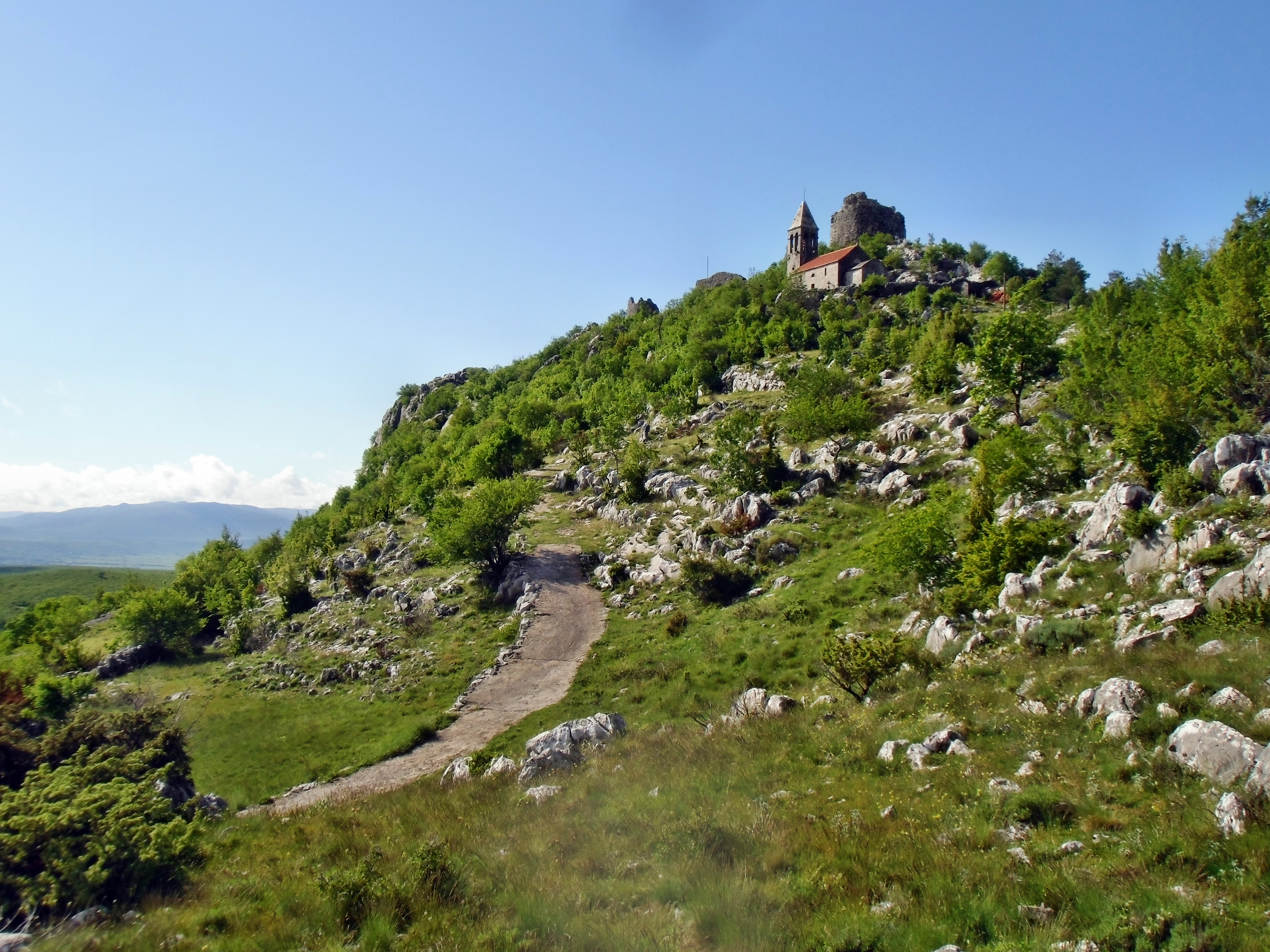
Fort Čačvina
