= Fort Čačvina =

Fortress in Dalmatia, Croatia

Coordinates: 43°36′30″N 16°47′58″E

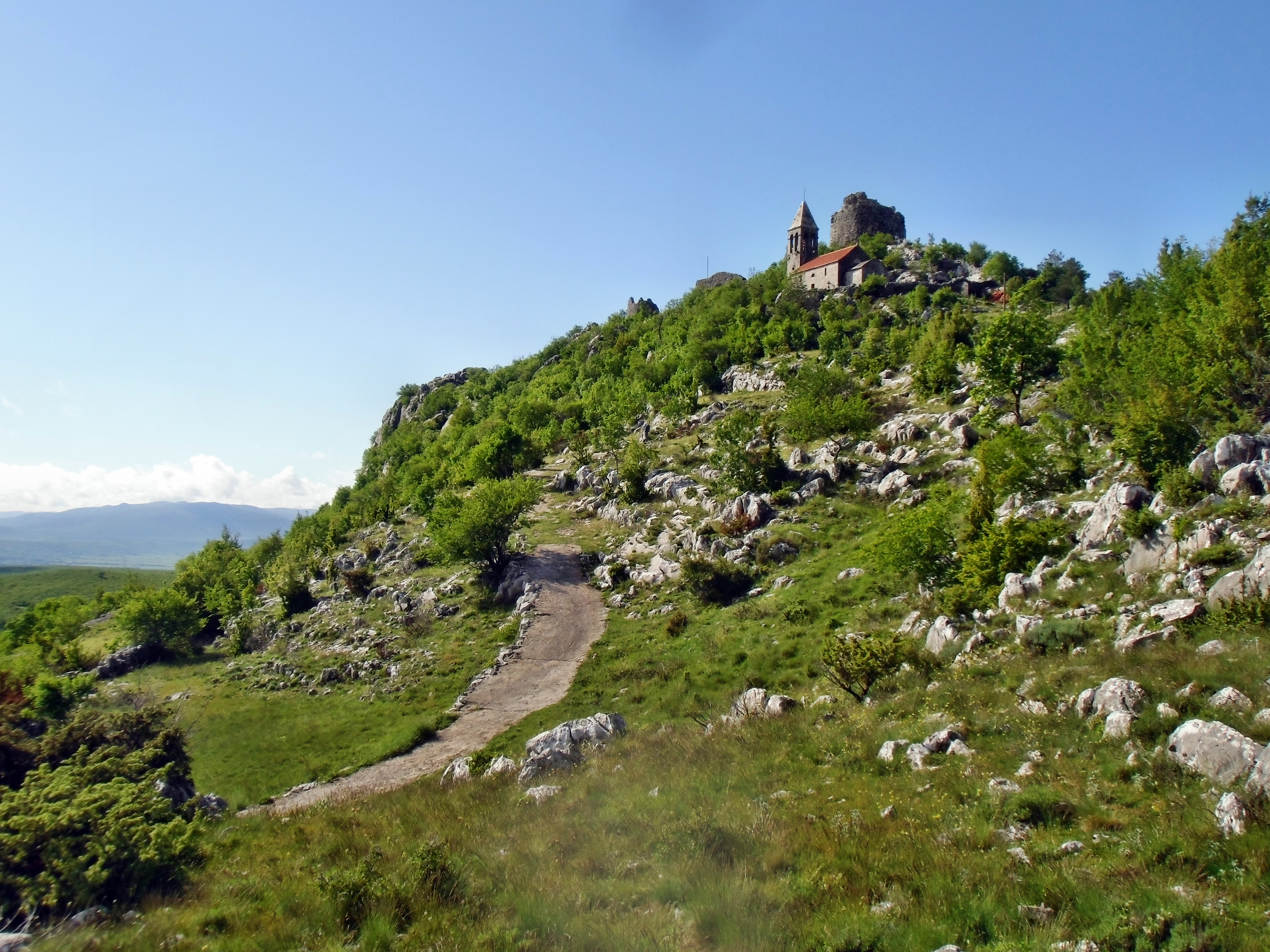
Fort Čačvina

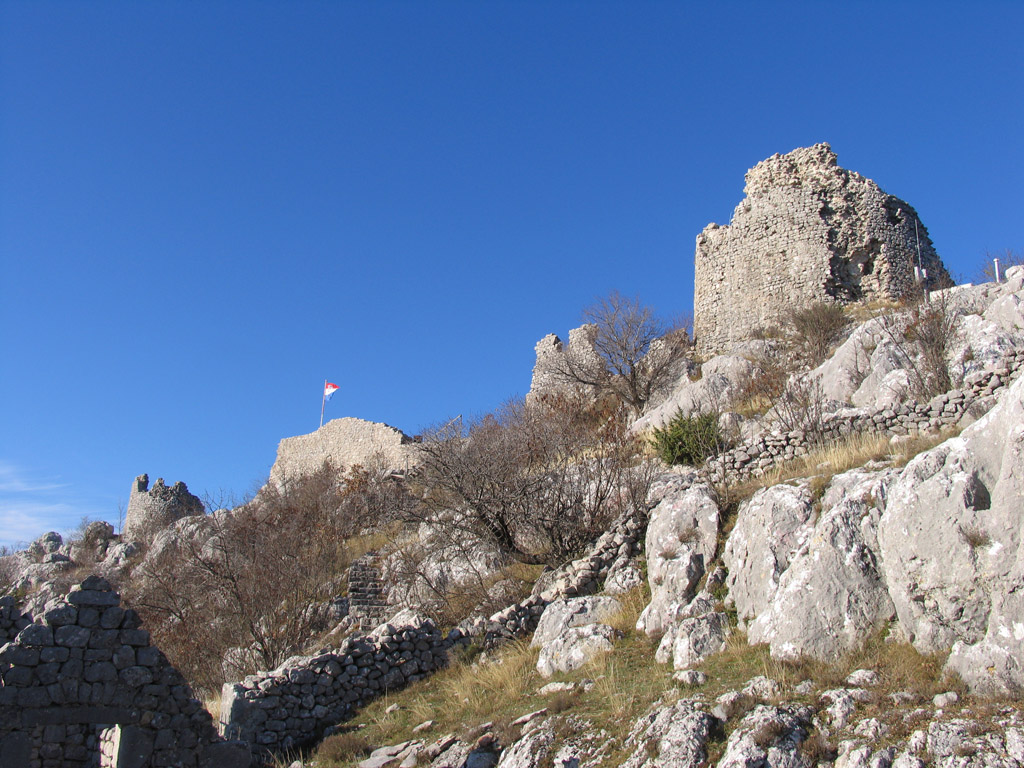
Towers of Fort Čačvina

Fort Čačvina is a medieval fortification, now in ruins, just above the village of Čačvina in modern-day Croatia. It was built on a hill at an altitude of 705 metres (2,313 ft) to control a key ancient route through the passages of the Dinaric Alps from coastal Dalmatia to Bosnia. Remains of a 1st-century ancient road have been found in the vicinity.

The fortress features two towers joined by a long courtyard. The larger, better-preserved east tower has an irregular circular exterior and an octagonal interior. The smaller west tower is less preserved. Archaeological evidence spans from late antiquity to the early 18th century, mainly the late Middle Ages. Below the fortress is an 18th-century old parish Church of All Saints with a facade bell tower.

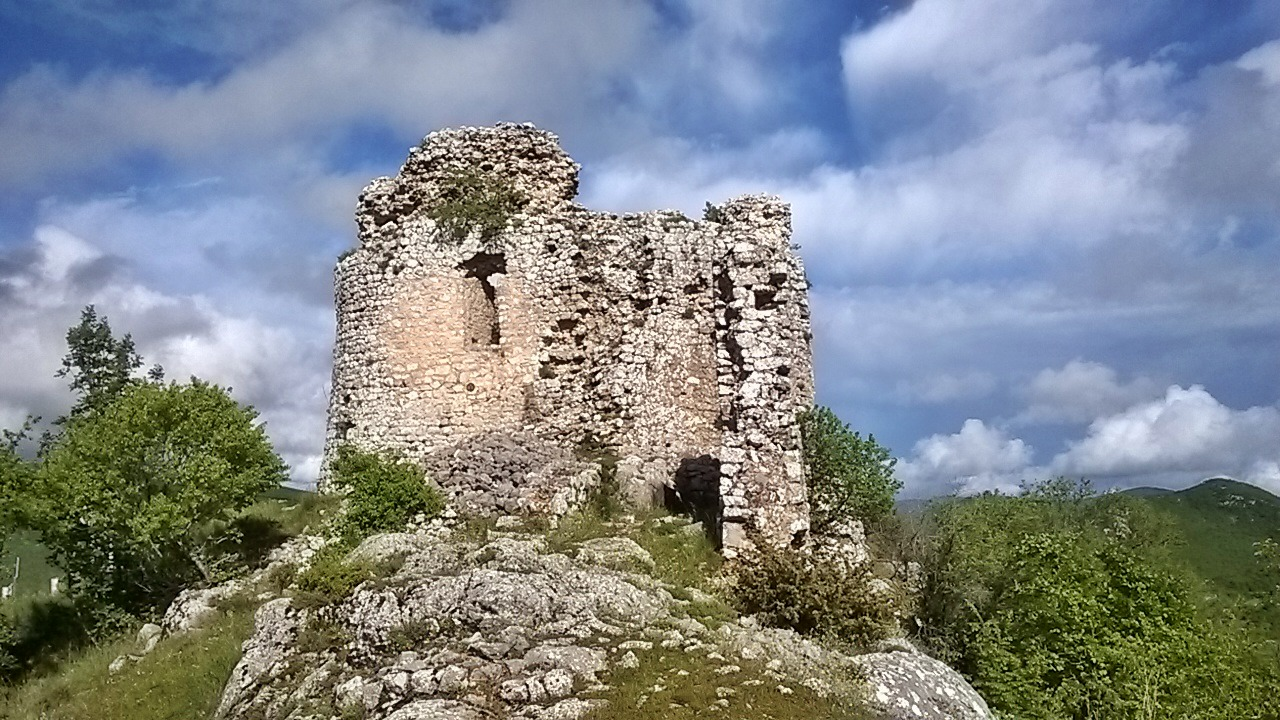
One of the Fort Čačvina towers

The area was under the House of Šubić until 1322. First recorded in 1371, the fortress belonged to the Nelipić family until the early 15th century. It was held by the Frankopans from 1435, then from 1436 by the Talovci, and from 1459 by Herceg Stjepan Vukčić Kosača, who fought King Tomaš for it. The Ottomans controlled Čačvina from 1513 to 1718 as part of Sanjak of Herzegovina. It then became part of Venetian Dalmatia, and abandoned in the mid-18th century. The fortress was demolished during French rule in 1808.

During the 1992–1997 archeological excavations a marble capital from late antiquity, stone and metal cannonballs, fragments of late medieval pottery and glass, metal tools, arrowheads, and bone crossbow pieces were found.

The fort and the Church of All Saints are protected as an immovable cultural property of Croatia.

== See also ==
- Fort Nutjak
