= Battle of Klis (1596) =

Battle during Long Turkish War

Battle for Klis
- Part of Long Turkish War
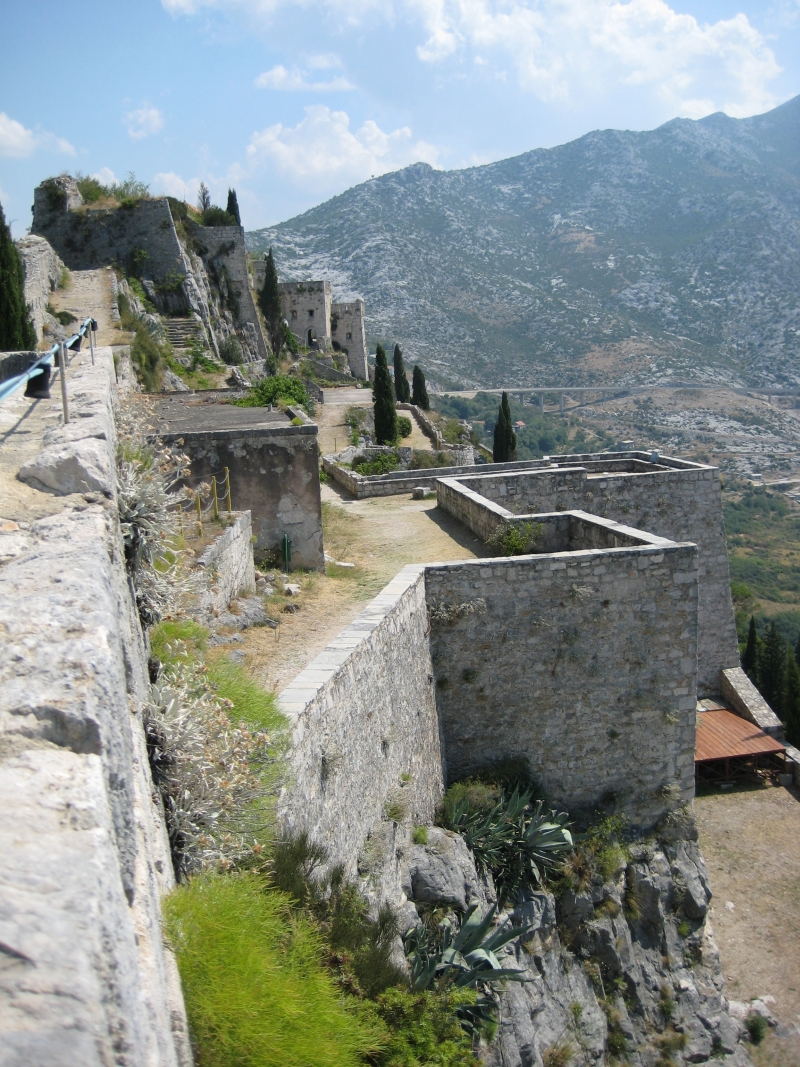
- Klis fortress in 2007
Date	6 April – 30 May 1596
Location	Fortress of Klis, Sanjak of Klis, Ottoman Empire (modern-day Croatia)
Result	Ottoman victory
Territorial changes	Klis quickly recaptured by the Ottomans

Belligerents
Holy Roman Empire; Kingdom of Croatia; Papal States; Republic of Venice	Ottoman Empire

Commanders and leaders
Irregular Christian forces from Split: Giovanni Alberti; Francesco Antonio Bertucci; Nikola Cindro Uskoks: voivode Nikola Lasinović; Ivo Senjanin Poljice forces: Pavao Papić Nikola Suđić	Sanjakbey Mustafa Pijadepašić Ibrahim-aga, captain of the Klis garrison

Units involved
30 Venetian irregulars from Split; 300 Uskoks; 200 men from Poljice unknown number of Joint Habsburg-Venetian relief forces	2,000 Sanjak of Klis three other Ottoman Sanjaks in Bosnia – 6,000 men (Sanjak of Krka)

Strength
600	8,000 men

Casualties and losses
Unknown	At least 400 members of Klis garrison were killed at least 210 Muslim civilians were killed

The Battle for Klis took place between Venetian irregulars from Split supported by Uskoks and relief Habsburg and Venetian Empire forces, and an Ottoman garrison, over the control of the fortress of Klis.

== Background ==
The fortress of Klis had a significant strategic position because its position was at the main entrance from the northeastern Adriatic coast into the territory of Ottoman-held Bosnia. The capture of Klis would leave this key entrance into Bosnia unguarded. Since the mid-16th century Klis slowly lost its prestige to Livno, where the sanjakbey of Klis resided, while the fortress of Klis was guarded by a garrison of 400 men commanded by a captain.

The heart of 1596 plans for the uprising in the eastern Adriatic region was Francesco Antonio Bertucci. According to some suggestions, the main reason for his anti-Ottoman activities were his plans to recapture the Priory of Vrana from the Ottomans. According to Bertucci's plan, the rebels (including Uskoks) would first capture Klis, Herceg Novi and Scutari from the Ottomans. That would trigger a large Ottoman naval expedition on the Adriatic northwards and draw the Venetians, who otherwise refused to join the crusade, to join the alliance against the Ottomans. Bertucci initially established the seat of the anti-Ottoman conspiracy in Ragusa. The Ragusans were worried because of the anti-Ottoman actions of Ragusan Jesuits. According to some rumours, the Republic of Ragusa was ready to expel Aleksandar Komulović because the Ottomans offered them some benefits if they did. The seat of anti-Ottoman conspiracy was then moved to Split. A member of Split Venetian nobility, Giovanni Alberti decided to capture Klis. Alberti argued with his brother Mateja over the preparations for the attack and Mateja informed the Ottomans about it.

== Battle ==
=== Christian capture of Klis ===
Ivo Senjanin was one of the commanders of the Uskok forces. Two Mihnić brothers and four Milošević brothers (Luka, Vujica, Martin and Matej) from Klis were among the people from Klis who helped the Christian forces to recapture Klis.

The capture began late at night on 6 April 1596 when a group of 30 citizens of Split with some help from inside of the fortress, attacked and killed all the guards of the fortress. Early on 7 April 1596 a group of Uskoks who were Habsburg citizens and about thirty Venetian citizens captured the Ottoman-held fortress of Klis with the support of some members of the Ottoman garrison.

At dawn this small group received substantial reinforcements when 300 Uskoks led by Nikola Lasinović, Ivan Vlatković and Bijanki came to help them. The reinforced Christian forces attacked the Ottomans who retreated to several houses in the lower part of the town, burning one granary during this attack. With all those reinforcements, the irregulars from Split managed to capture all of the fortress except tower Oprah where some 210 civilians found shelter. The Oprah tower was captured a day later, on 8 April 1596. The Uskoks were concerned that they would not be able to hold the fortress against the Ottoman counterattack they expected. Therefore, in the evening of 8 April 1596 they loaded food and prisoners on a boat in Žrnovnica to be transported to Senj. This left the garrison in Klis without food and made their position during the expected Ottoman siege much more difficult. According to some sources, the boat with food and prisoners was captured by Venetians near Šibenik.

The count of Poljice Pavao Papić and Nikola Suđić together with 200 men from Poljice came to reinforce the Christian garrison after Klis had already been captured.

When the Christian forces captured Klis they killed all members of its garrison.

=== Ottoman counterattack ===
Ibrahim-aga, the captain of the Klis fortress, was in Solin when he received news about the Christian capture of Klis. He rushed with his forces to recapture the fortress, but his attack was repulsed, and he had to retreat to Livno.

The Ottomans quickly organized strong forces and besieged Klis. The sanjakbey of the Sanjak of Klis Mustafa Pijadepašić quickly mobilized 600 men, both Muslims and Christians and on 12 April 1596 besieged Klis. The forces of three other Ottoman sanjaks joined them on 22 April and the number of men in the Ottoman forces rose to 8,000 in total.

The Ottoman besieging forces were supplied by the governor of the Venetian-held Split who warned the Ottomans that Uskoks were preparing for the capture of Klis earlier that year. Based on the instructions of the Venetian Senate to maintain good relations with the Ottomans, Venetian provveditore Benedetto Moro used every opportunity to help them. Some members of the besieged Christian forces who knew well the surrounding of the fortress, sneaked from the fortress during the night and went to Adriatic coast to meet with their friends and send desperate requests for help. On 24 April Uskok voivode Ivo Senjanin, Nikola Sugić and Ivan Matulić wrote to captain of Senj a letter in which they described the situation in Klis as desperate, the Christian garrison starving and requested help.

The joint Habsburg and Papal State troops, led personally by Antonio Bertucci, were sent to reinforce the weak Christian garrison in the newly captured fortress. The relief troops were supplied from the port of Senj. The Ottoman forces first defeated reinforcement troops and then reoccupied Klis. The Habsburg general who was supposed to lead the relief troops blamed Bertucci for this defeat. Bertucci was captured during this battle and briefly held in Ottoman captivity until he was ransomed.

On 31 May 1596 the besieged Christian forces had to retreat from Klis to Senj and Klis again fell into Ottoman hands. Many members of the Christian forces were killed while some of them were captured by the Ottomans and later ransomed from the Ottoman hands. Imprisoned and later ransomed Christian officers include Ivan Senjanin, Radič Miho, Stipanović Gašpar and Pavao Miovčić.

== Aftermath ==
Both Venetian and Ottoman forces organized numerous actions against Uskoks during next couple of years. The Ottomans plundered Christian population in Poljice, Klis and its surrounding which caused a wave of Christian emigration from this part of Dalmatia.

For his merits during this battle Ivo Senjanin was awarded with two mills in Žrnovnica by Austrian archduke Ferdinand. In next couple of years Uskoks undertook numerous attacks on caravans and ships of Ottoman Empire, Venice and Ragusa.

The Christian defeat had negative influence to his further attempts to convince Balkan Christian rulers to rebel against the Ottomans. The effects of the Battle of Klis to local population were much bigger than its actual historical importance.

Klis remained part of the Ottoman Empire until 1648 when the Venetians recaptured it.

== Legacy ==
In April 1996 the scientific simposium in honor of the 400th year since the Battle of Klis was held in Klis. The result of simposium was a 90-page publication about the battle.

== Sources ==
- Krokar, James P. (1973). "New Means to an Old End: Early Modern Maps in the Service of an Anti-Ottoman Crusade". Imago Mundi. 60: 23–38. doi:10.1080/03085690701669277. S2CID 162294068.
- zadruga (1993). Istorija srpskog naroda: knj. Od najstarijih vremena do Maričke bitke (1371). Srpska književna zadruga.
- hAnnracháin, Tadhg Ó (2015). Catholic Europe, 1592–1648: Centre and Peripheries. Oxford University Press. ISBN 978-0-19-927272-3.
- Klaić, Vjekoslav (1911). Povjest Hrvata: Dio 1. Četvrto doba: Vladanje kraljeva iz porodice Habsburga (1527-1740) 1. knj. Doba kraljeva Ferdinanda I., Maksimilijana i Rudolfa (1527-1608). Tisak i naklada knjižare L. Hartmana.
- Tomić, Jovan N. (1908). Grad Klis u 1596 godini. Srpska kraljevska akademija.
- Фрейденберг, М. М (1984). Дубровник и Османская империя (in Russian). Изд-во "Наука," Глав. ред. восточной лит-ры.
- Ćorović, Vladimir (1989). Abadon, anđeo uništenja: roman. Beogradski izdavačko-grafički zavod. ISBN 9788613003816.
- Sivric, Ivo (1982). The peasant culture of Bosnia and Herzegovina. Franciscan Herald Press. ISBN 978-0-8199-0850-6.
- Vrsalović, Dasen (1968). Povijest otoka Brača. Skupština općine Brač, Savjet za prosvjetu i kulturu.
- Marasović, Mario (2016). "Borbe za Klis u 16. i 17. stoljeću". Rostra (7): 135–156.
- Pera, Miroslav (1988). Poljički statut. Književni krug.
