= Petar Talovac =

Croatian nobleman

Petar Talovac (Hungarian: Tallóci Péter; died in 1453) was a Croatian nobleman, a member of the Talovac noble family. He was a vassal of the Croato-Hungarian king Sigismund who served first as administrator of the Archbishopric of Zagreb and then as Ban of Croatia and Dalmatia from 1438 until his death.

Petar and his brother Matko fought to obtain the Nelipić family holdings, with the former seizing their lands south of the Velebit. Talovac gained fame by defending the southern borders of the kingdom from the Ottoman Turks. His brother's death in 1445 made it difficult for him to hold the land south of the Velebit, but he succeeded in retaining most of it against the ambitions of the regent John Hunyadi, the Republic of Venice, King Thomas of Bosnia and the Bosnian magnate Stjepan Vukčić Kosača. He had two more brothers, Franko and Ivan.

He was married to Hedwig Garai and had two sons. Upon Talovac's death in 1453, the struggle to obtain his widow's hand in marriage and control over his lands led to an armed conflict between Thomas and Kosača.

== Bibliography ==
- Ćirković, Sima (1964). Историја средњовековне босанске државе (in Serbo-Croatian). Srpska književna zadruga.

Political offices
Preceded by Stjepan Frankopan	Ban of Croatia and Dalmatia; 1436–1453 with Matko Talovac (1436–1445)	Succeeded by Franko Talovac
