= Battle of Kosovo (1448) =

Part of the Ottoman wars in Europe and Ottoman-Hungarian Wars

Coordinates: 42.63°N 21.12°E

Second Battle of Kosovo
- Part of the Ottoman wars in Europe and the Hungarian–Ottoman Wars
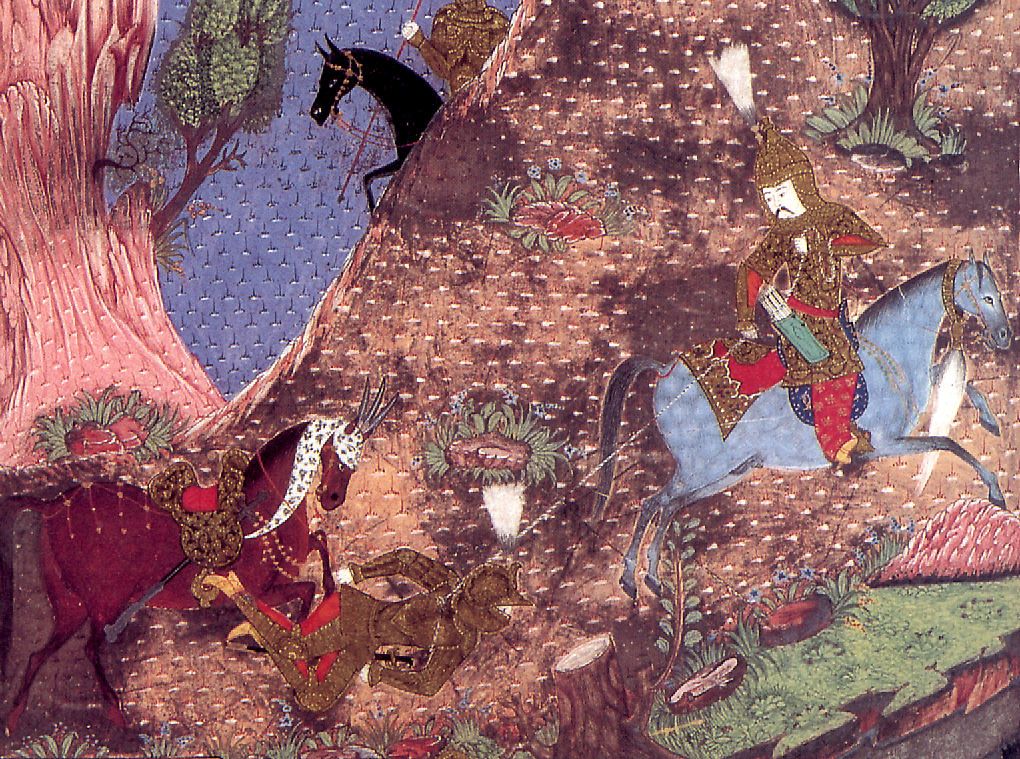
- A sipahi defeating a Hungarian knight with a lasso.
Date	17–20 October 1448 (O.S.) (3 days)
Location	Kosovo Field, Serbian Despotate
Result	Ottoman victory

Belligerents
Ottoman Empire supported by: Karamanids; Principality of Wallachia (Note: See the Wallachian army section)	Kingdom of Hungary; Kingdom of Croatia; Principality of Moldavia; Principality of Wallachia (Note: See the Wallachian army section) supported by: Grand Duchy of Lithuania

Commanders and leaders
(Ottoman Empire) Murad II (Ottoman Empire) Mehmed II	John Hunyadi; Michael Szilágyi; Franko Talovac † (Moldavia) Peter III (Wallachia) Vladislav II

Strength
50,000–60,000	31,000–47,000 (7,000 cavalry, 24,000–40,000 infantry)

Casualties and losses
4,000 (Note: The losses suffered by the two sides differ in the contemporary accounts. According to Laonikos Chalkokondyles 4,000 Turks dead against 17,000 enemies. According to Franz Babinger of the Hungarians around 17,000 died against 34,000 Turks. Antonio Bonfini offers the figure of 8,000 crusaders killed against 30,000 Turks. According to the anonymous of Constantinople the losses of the crusading army, including prisoners, were around 6,000–7,000 men.) or 34,000 to 35,000	6,000–17,000 17,000 (9,000 Hungarians, 2,000 Mercenaries, 6,000 Wallachians)

The Second Battle of Kosovo (Hungarian: második rigómezei csata, Turkish: İkinci Kosova Muharebesi) was a land battle between a Hungarian-led Crusader army and the Ottoman Empire at Kosovo field (the Field of Blackbirds) that took place from 17–20 October 1448. It was the culmination of a Hungarian offensive to avenge the defeat at the Battle of Varna four years earlier. In the three-day battle the Ottoman army under the command of Sultan Murad II defeated the Crusader army of regent John Hunyadi.

After the battle, the path was clear for the Turks to conquer Serbia and the other Balkan States; it also ended any hopes of saving Constantinople. The Hungarian kingdom no longer had the military and financial resources to mount an offensive against the Ottomans. With the end of the half-century-long Crusader threat to their European frontier, Murad's son Mehmed II was free to lay siege to Constantinople in 1453.

== Background ==
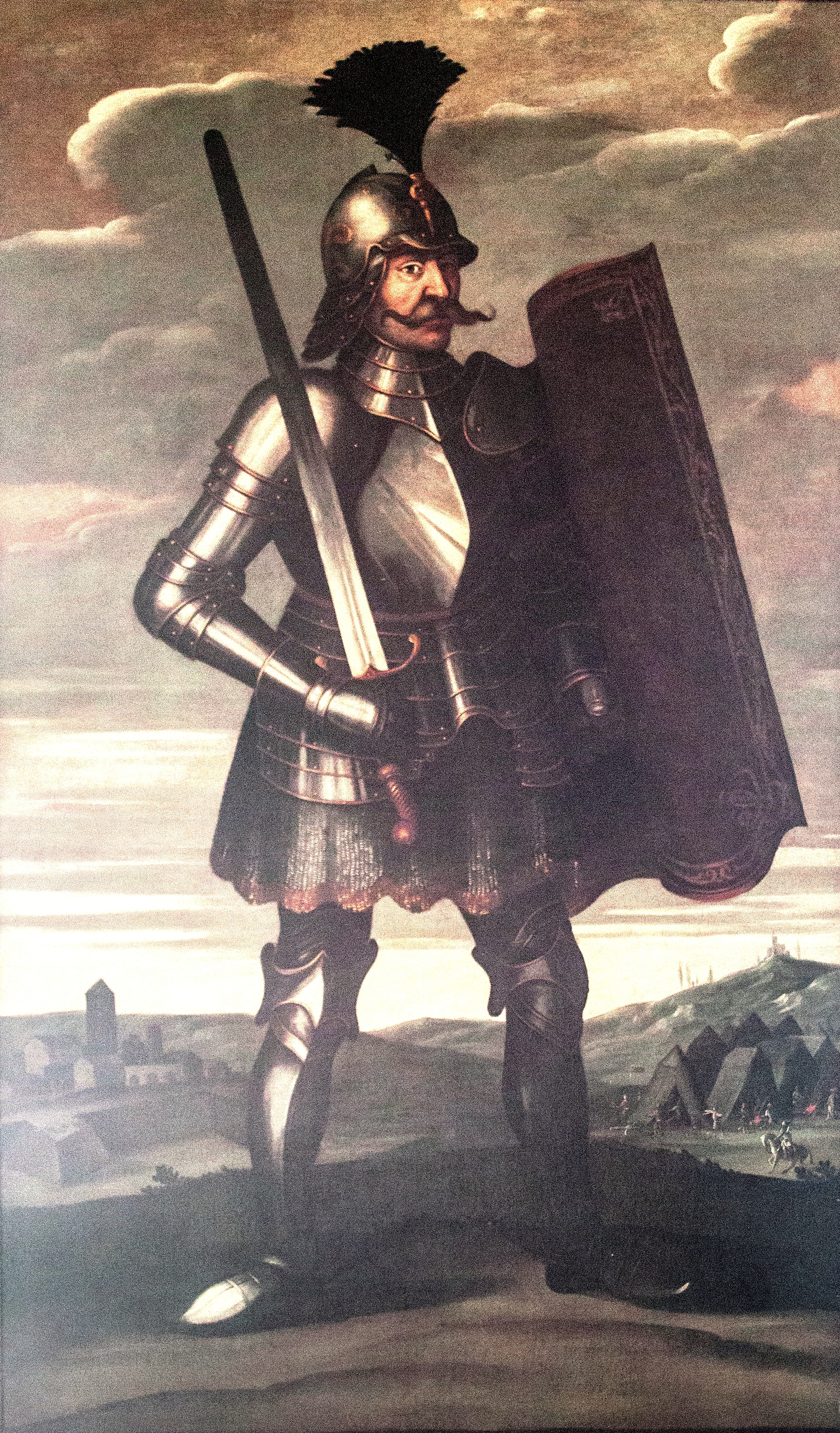
John Hunyadi, Regent-Governor of the Kingdom of Hungary in 1448

Anti-Ottoman campaigns of John Hunyadi, 1440–1456

In 1444, the Hungarian king, Władysław III of Poland, in breach of a ten-year truce that existed with the Ottoman Empire following the Peace of Szeged, launched a new crusade. Meeting the Ottoman forces at the Battle of Varna, the crusading army was destroyed and the king was killed. Two years later in 1446, Sultan Murad II returned to the Balkans seeking revenge for the treaty breaking that preceded the battle. That year his army breached the Hexamilion wall and ravaged the Peloponnese after which, following the proclamation of a new crusade by Pope Nicholas V, Murad invaded Albania, conquering the fortress of Svetigrad. Meanwhile, four years after his defeat at Varna, John Hunyadi, the richest landowner in Hungary, had joined forces with Albania's forces in an alliance that also included Serbia and Bosnia. Resolved to defeat the Ottoman army, Hunyadi raised an army of 24,000 men, including 4,000–8,000 Wallachians and 3,000 Moldavians, his Hungarian cavalry supplemented by German and Bohemian infantry mercenaries. Hunyadi's strategy was based on an expected revolt of the Balkan peoples, a surprise attack, and the destruction of the main force of the Ottomans in a single battle after linking up with his allies.

As Hunyadi wrote to the Pope before the battle, his principal goal was, if possible with international assistance, to defeat the Ottomans in a decisive battle, continue the war on Ottoman territory until its final conclusion, and expel the Ottomans from Europe.

They are exceedingly strong both in material resources and in numbers, and it is with them that we must measure our arms, and I fear that the war we have begun against the Turks will have to be waged against the whole of Asia... We shall bring it to an end only if we remain at the heels of the defeated enemy, and if we do not relent until the expulsion of the enemy from Europe has fulfilled our hopes... At present, Your Blessedness commands an army that can match them in pay, and commands soldiers who burn with the desire to avenge the grief inflicted upon their homes, who stand not in temporary, but in permanent arms against our eternal enemies, who will never be reconciled with the Christian name. Let only support not be withheld, so that, having achieved our goal, a liberated Europe, its faith restored, may proclaim the glory and splendor of the Holy See.

— A letter issued by John Vitéz, in the name of John Hunyadi, Governor of Hungary, to Pope Nicholas V (17 September 1448)

In September 1448, Hunyadi led his forces across the Danube and camped them in Serbia next to Kovin, just outside the Serbian capital of Smederevo. For a full month the Hungarians stayed encamped awaiting their German, Wallachian, Bohemian and Albanian allies. The news of the crusader threat forced Murad to abandon his campaign against Albania. Believing the strength of his army to be inadequate to face the crusaders, Murad retreated back to Sofia to stockpile resources necessary for the campaign and receive reinforcements. While gathering the necessary provisions in Sofia, news reached the army that a Wallachian force had crossed the Danube and attacked Ottoman positions in Nicopolis. A unit of Akinjis was dispatched to respond to the attack, which succeeded in ambushing and dispersing the Wallachians, taking many prisoners in the process. The POWs captured during the ambush were sent to Sofia, where the news of the victory had increased morale among the Ottoman troops before their march towards the crusader army. Meanwhile, the Albanian army under Skanderbeg was delayed as it was prevented from linking up with Hunyadi's army by the Ottomans and their allies. It is believed that the Albanian army was delayed by Serbian despot Đurađ Branković, whose army occupied the mountain passes on the Serbian-Albanian border, and by a Venetian attack on northern Albania. The Serbs had declined joining Hunyadi's forces due to an earlier truce with the Turks. Branković's exact role is disputed. As a result, Skanderbeg ravaged and pillaged Branković's domains as punishment for deserting the Christian cause, whereas Hunyadi decided not to wait for Skanderbeg and his reinforcements to open the battle.

== Battle ==
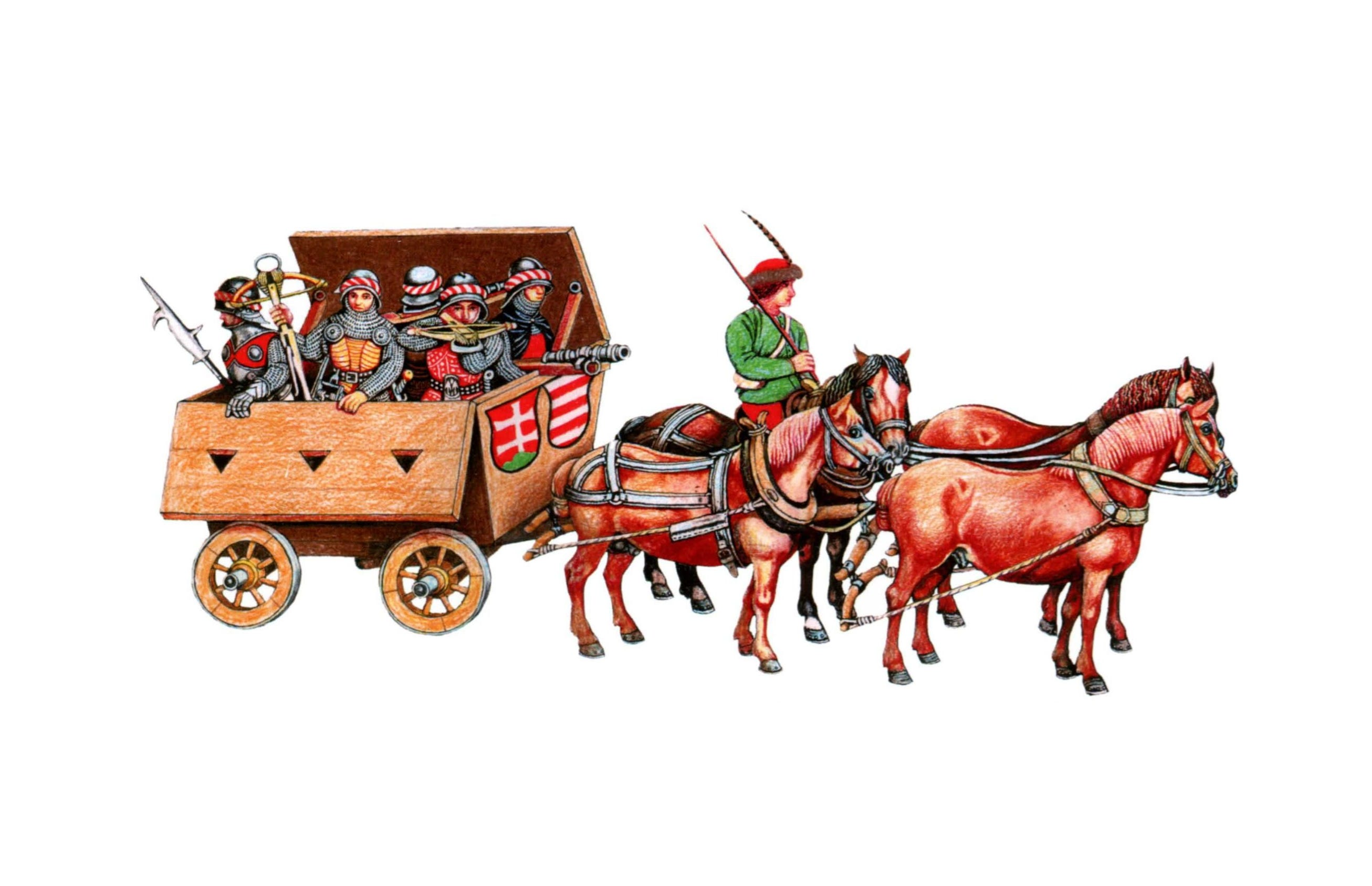
Hungarian wagon fort, middle of 15th century

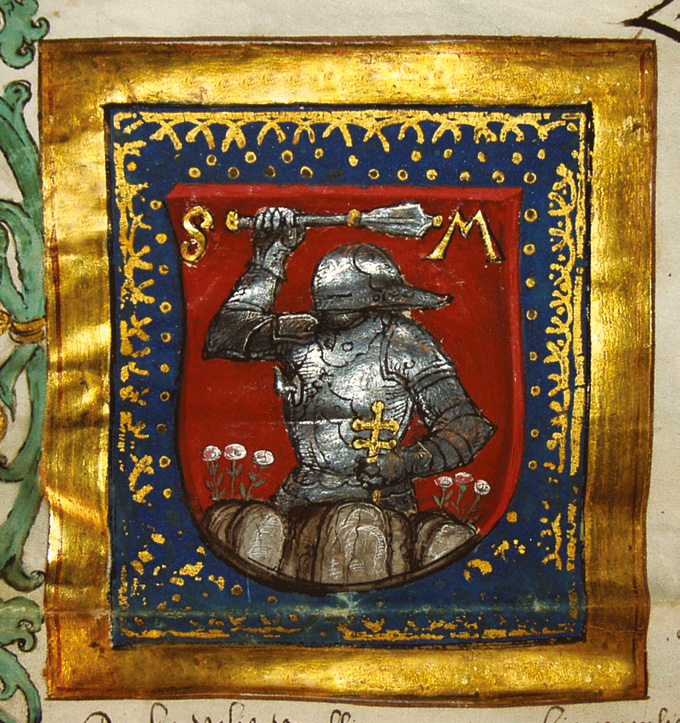
15th-century Hungarian heavily armoured soldier with mace

The battlefield was the same as that on which Sultan Murad I and Prince Lazar of Serbia had met their deaths during the First Battle of Kosovo in 1389. On this occasion, the Ottomans had achieved a victory over the Serbs and Hungarians, while John Hunyadi had failed to heed the warning.

The Crusaders, numbering 22,000–30,000 arrived at Kosovo Field (the site of the first Battle of Kosovo in 1389, between Serbs and Ottomans) facing an Ottoman army of 40,000–60,000 men. Sultan Murad personally commanded a large section of cannoneers and janissaries, while his son and would-be successor, 16-year-old Mehmed, who faced battle for the first time, led the Anatolian troops at the right wing. Hunyadi commanded the center of his army in the battle, while the crusader left wing was made up of Wallachians. The Hungarians had a long barrage cannons. Calculating that he would need more than 40,000 men to defeat the Ottomans, the Hungarian regent sought to join up with anti-Ottoman Albanian forces. The Ottomans in their base at Sofia received word of the Crusader army's march route and subsequently began readying their men.

Having failed to locate the main Ottoman army, whom he believed to still be at their capital in Edirne, Hunyadi was caught by surprise on the 17th of October when the Ottoman army appeared in front of his men at Kosovo Field. He constructed a tabor wagon fort at Plementina hill from which to fight the Ottomans, who built their own stockade in response. The battle opened when Hunyadi attacked the Ottoman flanks with mixed cavalry (light and heavy). The Turkish flanks, consisting of soldiers from Rumelia and Anatolia, were losing until the Turkish light cavalry arrived to reinforce them. Cavalry skirmishing on the flanks of the stockades during the first two days and a Crusader night-time attack using their wagons and guns against the Sultan's central position on the night of 18/19 October produced much bloodshed but no conclusive results. The Christian flanks were subsequently routed and the survivors retreated back to Hunyadi's main force. On 19 October Murad II used his sipahi cavalry from Thessaly to envelop the cavalry on the Crusader left flank, along with a general assault all along the line to distract Hunyadi from the primary effort. The manoeuvre worked and the Wallachian, Moldavian, and Hungarian cavalry were cut down by the sipahis, who took no prisoners.

When Hunyadi saw the defeat of his flanks, he attacked with his main force, composed of knights and light infantry. The janissary corps were not successful at stopping the attack; the cavalry made progress through the Turkish centre, but were eventually stopped at the Turkish camp. When the main attack was halted, the Turkish infantry regrouped and successfully drove the Hungarian knights back. The light cavalry, who now lacked the knights' support, were also overcome. Much of the crusader army then retreated to their camp. On the 20th of October, the Wallachians deserted to the Ottoman side after being offered terms from Murad, leaving Hunyadi mostly defenceless.

With Murad II personally observing the struggle, the Janissaries attacked and killed everyone left in the stockade. Hunyadi fled, but was later captured by the Serbs. During the night, Turkish infantry fired missiles at the Hungarians, who replied with cannon fire. On the next day, a final assault destroyed the remaining troops of the Hungarian army.

== Aftermath ==
The Christian Balkan states were unable to resist the Ottomans after this defeat, eventually falling one after the other under the control of the Ottoman Empire. Hunyadi was captured by Branković in retaliation for the damage perpetrated by the Hungarian army in Serbia. Hunyadi's release was negotiated against a ransom of 100,000 florins, the return of the domains that Hunyadi had revocated from Branković, and the engagement of Hunyadi's heir to Branković's daughter, other sources cite the restitution of the despot's estates in Hungary while leaving Hunyadi's elder son László at Smederevo as a hostage. For the remainder of his reign Hunyadi successfully defended the Kingdom of Hungary against Ottoman campaigns. As punishment for lending its support to Hunyadi, Murad attacked and submitted Wallachia in 1449, followed by Albania in 1450 where Skanderbeg continued to resist, breaking Murad's siege of the Castle of Krujë in 1451. That year Murad died replaced by his 19-year-old son Mehmed II who, after securing Constantinople in 1453, launched a new military campaign against Serbia in 1454.

== Wallachian army ==
While some sources record the Wallachians allegedly switched to the Ottoman side on day 3 of the battle, Antoche does not fully accept the claim that they defected, regarding it instead as an exaggeration.
