= Battle of Varna =

Battle in the Crusade of Varna

- Part of the Crusade of Varna and the Hungarian–Ottoman Wars
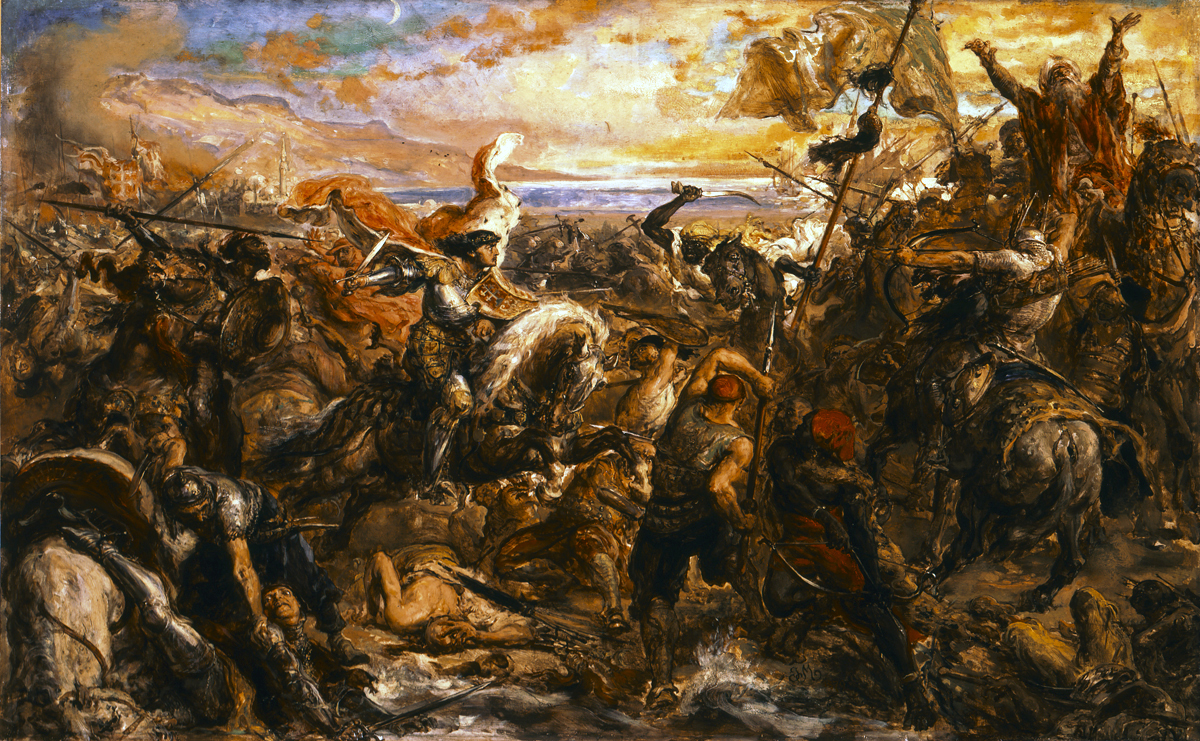
- The battle of Varna (1879) by Jan Matejko; The episode of King Władysław attack on the Ottoman camp
| Date | November 10, 1444; 582 years ago |
| Location | Near Varna, Ottoman Empire; Present-day Bulgaria 43°13′N 27°53′E |
| Result | Ottoman victory |

Belligerents
| Ottoman Empire | Kingdom of Hungary; Kingdom of Croatia; Kingdom of Poland; Principality of Wallachia; Teutonic Order |

Commanders and leaders
| (Ottoman Empire) Murad II (Ottoman Empire) Mehmed II (Ottoman Empire) Şehabeddin Pasha (Ottoman Empire) Karaca Pasha (Ottoman Empire) Karaca Bey † | Władysław III (MIA); John Hunyadi; Michael Szilágyi; Stephen III Báthory †; Simon Rozgonyi †; John de Dominis †; Franko Talovac (Wallachia) Mircea II; Julian Cesarini †; Jan Čapek; Fruzhin |

Strength
| 50,000–60,000; 40,000–50,000 Anatolian troops; 10,000 Rumelian troops | 20,000; 6,000 Hungarians; 5,000 troops by Hunyadi; 4,000 Polish cavalry; 4,000 Wallachian cavalry; 1,000 Crusaders recruited by Cesarini; 44,000–55,000; 30,000 Hungarian and Polish troops (15,000 cavalry, 15,000 infantry); 4,000–10,000 Wallachian troops; 10,000–15,000 troops- Lithuanians, Croats, Moldavians, Serbs, Bosnians, Bulgarians, Teutonic Knights and Papal troops |

Casualties and losses
| Heavy Up to 7,000 killed | Heavy 40,000–51,000 killed or captured |
- Location within Bulgaria Battle of Varna (Black Sea)

The Battle of Varna took place on 10 November 1444 near Varna in what is today eastern Bulgaria. The Ottoman army under Sultan Murad II (who did not actually rule the sultanate at the time) defeated the Crusaders commanded by King Władysław III of Poland and Hungary, John Hunyadi (acting as commander of the combined Christian forces) and Mircea II of Wallachia. It was the final battle of the unsuccessful Crusade of Varna, a last-ditch effort to prevent further Ottoman expansion into the Balkans.

== Background ==
Anti-Ottoman Campaigns of John Hunyadi, 1440–1456

The Hungarian Kingdom fell into crisis after the death of King Sigismund in 1437. His son-in-law and successor, King Albert, ruled for only two years and died in 1439, leaving his widow Elizabeth with an unborn child, Ladislaus the Posthumous. The Hungarian noblemen then called the young King Władysław III of Poland to the throne of Hungary, expecting his aid in defense against the Ottomans. After his Hungarian coronation, he never went back to his homeland again, assuming rule of the Hungarian Kingdom next to the influential nobleman John Hunyadi.

After failed expeditions in 1440–1442 against Belgrade and Transylvania and the defeats of the Turks during Hunyadi's "long campaign" in 1442–1443, the Ottoman sultan Murad II signed a ten-year truce with Hungary. After he had made peace with the Karaman Emirate in Anatolia in August 1444, he resigned the throne to his twelve-year-old son Mehmed II.

Cesarini insisted that the Hungarian King Władysław III should break the treaty, arguing that it was not valid due to the fact that it had been made with infidels. Hungary co-operated with Venice and Pope Eugene IV to organize a new crusader army led by Hunyadi and Władysław III. On receipt of this news, Çandarlı Halil Pasha recalled Murad II against the Christian Coalition, even though Mehmed II did not accept this and wanted to fight himself. As a result, Murad II commanded the Ottoman army.

== Preparations ==
The mixed Papal army was composed mainly of Hungarian, Polish, Bohemian (whose combined armies numbered 16,000) and Wallachian (4,000) forces, with smaller detachments of papal troops, Teutonic Knights, Bosnians, Croats, Bulgarians, Lithuanians, and Ruthenians. Troops from Croatia and Bosnia were led by Croatian nobleman Franko Talovac.

Papal, Venetian and Burgundian ships under Alvise Loredan had blockaded the Dardanelles as the Hungarian army was to advance on Varna, while a second flotilla comprising six ships (two Burgundian, two Ragusan and two Byzantine) blockaded the Bosphorus. Both failed, and the main Ottoman force from Asia, including the sultan, crossed the Bosphorus on 18 October 1444. The Hungarian advance was rapid, Ottoman fortresses were bypassed, while local Bulgarians from Vidin, Oryahovo, and Nicopolis joined the army (Fruzhin, son of Ivan Shishman, also participated in the campaign with his own guard). On 10 October near Nicopolis, some 7,000 Wallachian cavalrymen under Mircea II, one of Vlad Dracul's sons, also joined.

Armenian refugees in the Kingdom of Hungary also took part in the wars of their new country against the Ottomans as early as the battle of Varna in 1444, when some Armenians were seen amongst the Christian forces.

== Deployment ==
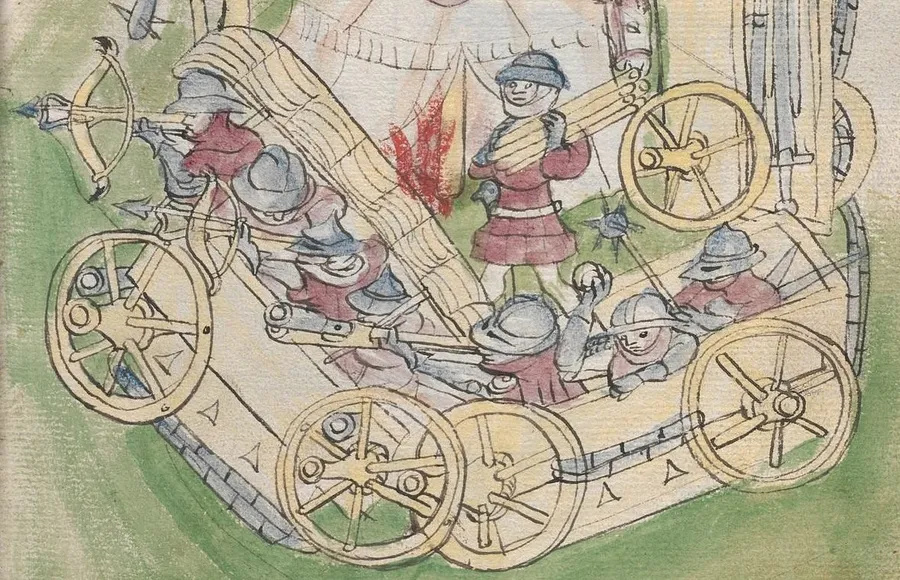
The Hussite Wagenburg – an old sketch from the 15th century.

Late on November 9, a large Ottoman army of around 40,000 or 60,000 men approached Varna from the west. At a supreme military council called by Hunyadi during the night, the papal legate, cardinal Julian Cesarini, insisted on a quick withdrawal. However, the Christians were caught between the Black Sea, Lake Varna, the steep wooded slopes of the Franga Plateau (356 m high), and the enemy. Cesarini then proposed a defense using the Wagenburg of the Hussites until the arrival of the Christian fleet. The Hungarian magnates and the Croatian and Czech commanders backed him, but the young (20-year-old) Władysław and Hunyadi rejected the defensive tactics. Hunyadi declared: "To escape is impossible, to surrender is unthinkable. Let us fight with bravery and honor our arms." Władysław accepted this position and gave him the command. Andreas del Palatio states that Hunyadi commanded the "Wallachian army" indicating a large Romanian component in Hunyadi's personal army.

In the morning of 10 November, Hunyadi deployed the army of some 20,000 crusaders as an arc between Lake Varna and the Franga plateau; the line was about 3.5 km long. Two banners with a total of 3,500 men from the king's Polish and Hungarian bodyguards, Hungarian royal mercenaries, and banners of Hungarian nobles held the center. The Wallachian cavalry was left in reserve behind the center.

The right flank that lined up the hill towards the village of Kamenar numbered 6,500 men in 5 banners. Dalmatian John de Dominis, Bishop of Varadin with his personal banner led the force; Cesarini commanded a banner of German mercenaries and a Bosnian one. The Bishop of Eger Simon Rozgonyi led his own banner, and the military governor of Slavonia, ban Franko Talovac, commanded one Croatian banner.

The left flank, a total of 5,000 men in 5 banners, was led by Michael Szilágyi, Hunyadi's brother in law, and was made up of Hunyadi's Transylvanians, Bulgarians, German mercenaries and banners of Hungarian magnates. Behind the Hungarians, closer to the Black Sea and the lake, was the Wagenburg, defended by 300 or 600 Czech and Ruthenian mercenaries under hetman Ceyka, along with Poles, Lithuanians and Wallachians. Every wagon was crewed with 7 to 10 soldiers and the Wagenburg was equipped with bombards.

The Ottoman center included the Janissaries and levies from Rumelia deployed around two Thracian burial mounds. Murad observed and directed the battle from one of them. The Janissaries dug in behind ditches and two palisades. The right wing consisted of Kapikulus and Sipahis from Rumelia, and the left wing was made up by Akıncıs, Sipahis from Anatolia, and other forces. Janissary archers and Akıncı light cavalry were deployed on the Franga plateau.

== Battle ==
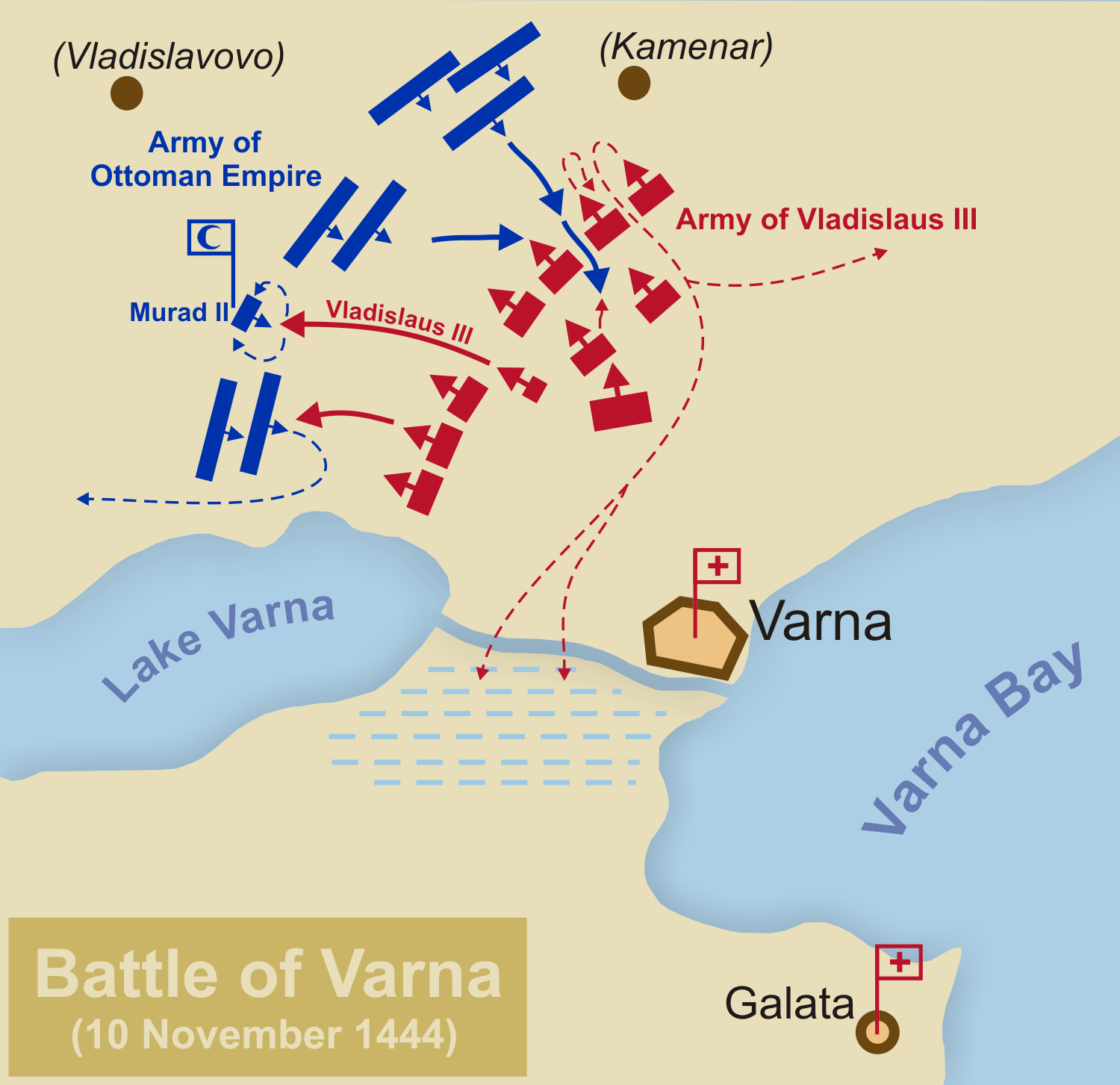
Movements of the forces during the battle.

The light Ottoman cavalry assaulted the Croats of ban Franco Talotsi. Christians from the left riposted with bombards and firearms and stopped the attack. Christian soldiers chased the Ottomans in a disorderly pursuit. The Anatolian cavalry ambushed them from the flank. The Christian right wing attempted to flee to the small fortress of Galata on the other side of Varna Bay, but most of them were slain in the marshland around Varna Lake and the River Devnya, where Cesarini also met his end. Only ban Talotsi's troops managed to withdraw behind the Wagenburg.

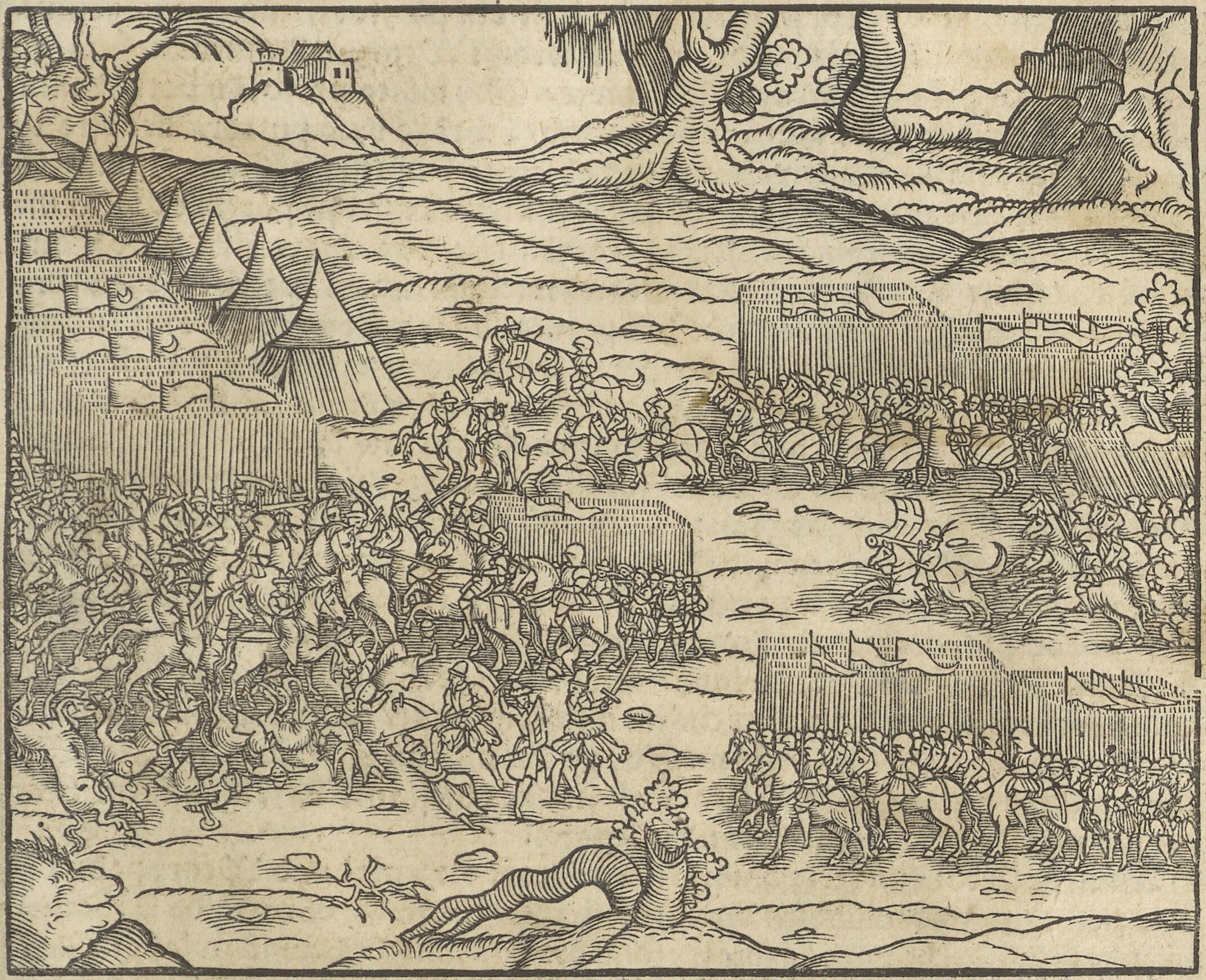
A scene from the Battle of Varna (1444) on the Kronika wszystkiego świata of Marcin Bielski, published in 1564.

The other Ottoman flank assaulted the Hungarians and Bulgarians of Michael Szilagyi. Their push was stopped and turned back; then Sipahis attacked again. Hunyadi decided to help and advised Władysław to wait until he returned; then advanced with two cavalry companies. The young king, ignoring Hunyadi's advice, rushed 500 of his Polish knights against the Ottoman center. They attempted to overrun the Janissary infantry and take Murad prisoner, and almost succeeded, but in front of Murad's tent Władysław's horse either fell into a trap or was stabbed.

According to three Turkish chroniclers (Neşri, Sadeddin Effendi and anonymous one), the king was supposedly beheaded by mercenary whose name was claimed to "KaradĪa Khizr", "KodĪa Chyzyr", "KodĪa Khizr" or "KodĪa Hyzyr"; however it is contradicted by personal memorandum of Murad II, which says Władysław survived the battle and was executed later in the Ottoman captivity. The young ruler's alleged death was not witnessed by any of his Polish or Hungarian men, and Ottomans did not present his body, leaving uncertainty about his ultimate fate and unconfirmed rumors about his possible survival; he nevertheless did not return to any of his kingdoms and was assumed to have fallen in battle.

On his return, Hunyadi tried frantically to salvage the king's body, but all he could accomplish was to organize the retreat of the remains of his army; it suffered thousands of casualties in the chaos, and was virtually annihilated. Neither the head nor body of the king were ever found. The minnesinger Michael Beheim wrote a song based on the story of Hans Mergest, who spent 16 years in Ottoman captivity after the battle.

== Aftermath ==
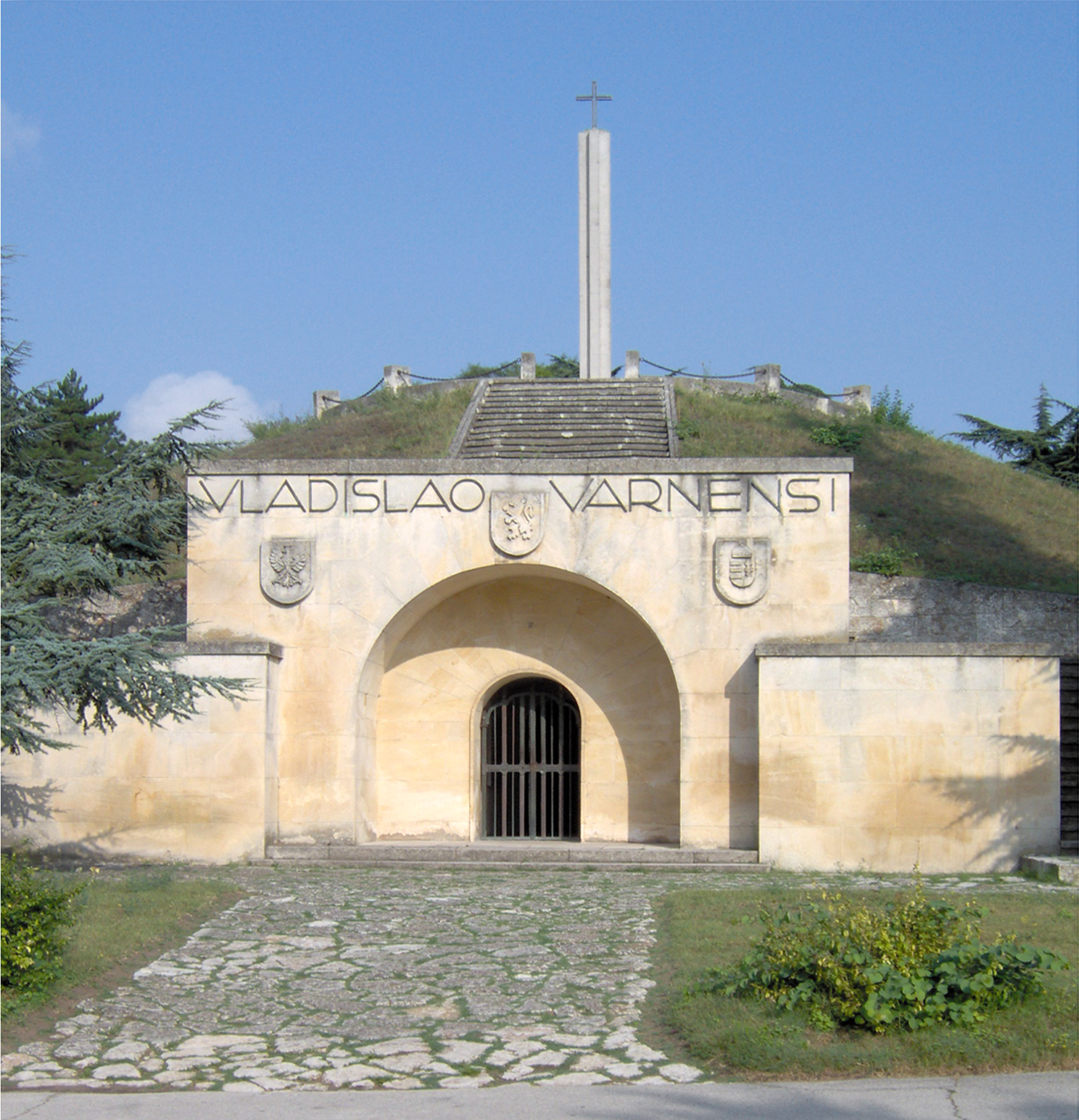
The Memorial of the Battle in Varna, built on an ancient Thracian mound tomb, bearing the name of the fallen king.

Hunyadi reached the Danube but was captured by Vlad Dracul in Wallachia and imprisoned as insurance in case of Ottoman retaliation or for a high ransom. He was released in exchange for a large amount of money when Hungarian nobles loyal to Hunyadi began to threaten Vlad Dracul with a campaign against him. Another version of the story is that he was mistakenly captured by Wallachian border guards, who didn't recognize him, and released by Vlad Dracul once they met face to face. After the death of Władysław III, Hunyadi became one of the most important and powerful members of the Hungarian nobility, becoming the Governor of Hungary on 5 June 1446. He was later made a Duke by the Pope in 1447.

Hungarian nobles found it hard to believe that both their king and Cesarini had died, leading to spies being sent south of the Danube, but no information was found other than what was already known.

The presumed death of Władysław III left Hungary in the hands of the four-year-old Ladislaus Posthumous of Bohemia and Hungary. He was succeeded in Poland by Casimir IV Jagiellon after a three-year interregnum.

The Ottoman victory in Varna, followed by the Ottoman victory in the Second Battle of Kosovo in 1448, deterred the European states from sending any substantial military assistance to the Byzantines during the Ottoman siege of Constantinople in 1453. Hunyadi signed a three-year truce with the Ottoman central government in 1451.

Only the European victory at Belgrade would stop the Ottomans from conquering large parts of Europe. Hungary would be safe for another 70 years after this victory until the Hungarian army was crushed by the Ottomans at the Battle of Mohács in 1526, which would lead to the end of Hungary as an independent united kingdom for almost 400 years.

== Legacy ==
In the aftermath, the Ottomans had removed a significant opposition to their expansion into central and eastern Europe; subsequent battles forced a large number of Europeans to become Ottoman subjects.

The fallen Polish king was named Ladislaus of Varna (Władysław III Warneńczyk) in memory of the battle.

The Battle of Varna is commemorated on the Tomb of the Unknown Soldier, Warsaw, with the inscription "WARNA 10 XI 1444".

The earliest possible start date of the grand strategy game Europa Universalis IV is intentionally set one day after the battle.

The Hungarian book series about John Hunyadi was adapted into a television miniseries, Rise of the Raven, released in 2025. The series also depicts the Battle of Varna, dramatizing the key events and strategies involved in the conflict.

== Sources ==
- Ervin Liptai (1984), Magyarország hadtörténete I. Zrínyi Katonai Kiadó, Budapest. ISBN 963-326-320-4 – (in Hungarian)
- Jefferson, John (2012). The Holy Wars of King Wladislas and Sultan Murad: The Ottoman-Christian Conflict from 1438–1444. Leiden: Brill Publishers. ISBN 978-90-04-21904-5.
- Pálosfalvi, Tamás (2018). From Nicopolis to Mohács: A History of Ottoman-Hungarian Warfare, 1389–1526. The Ottoman Empire and Its Heritage: Politics, Society and Economy 63. Leiden: Brill. ISBN 978-90-04-37565-9.
- Pogăciaș, Andrei (2015). "John Hunyadi and the Late Crusade". In Sabaté, Flocel (ed.). Life and Religion in the Middle Ages. Cambridge Scholars Publishing. ISBN 9781443881654.
- Setton, Kenneth M. (1978). The Papacy and the Levant (1204–1571), Volume II: The Fifteenth Century. Vol. 2. Philadelphia: The American Philosophical Society. ISBN 0-87169-127-2.
- Święch, Zbigniew (1995). Klątwy, mikroby i uczeni. Tom 3, część 1: Ostatni Krzyżowiec Europy. Oddychający sarkofag – astralne życie Warneńczyka? (in Polish). Wydawnictwo Wawelskie. ISBN 83-85347-09-7.
