= Priory of Vrana =

- prioratus Auranae
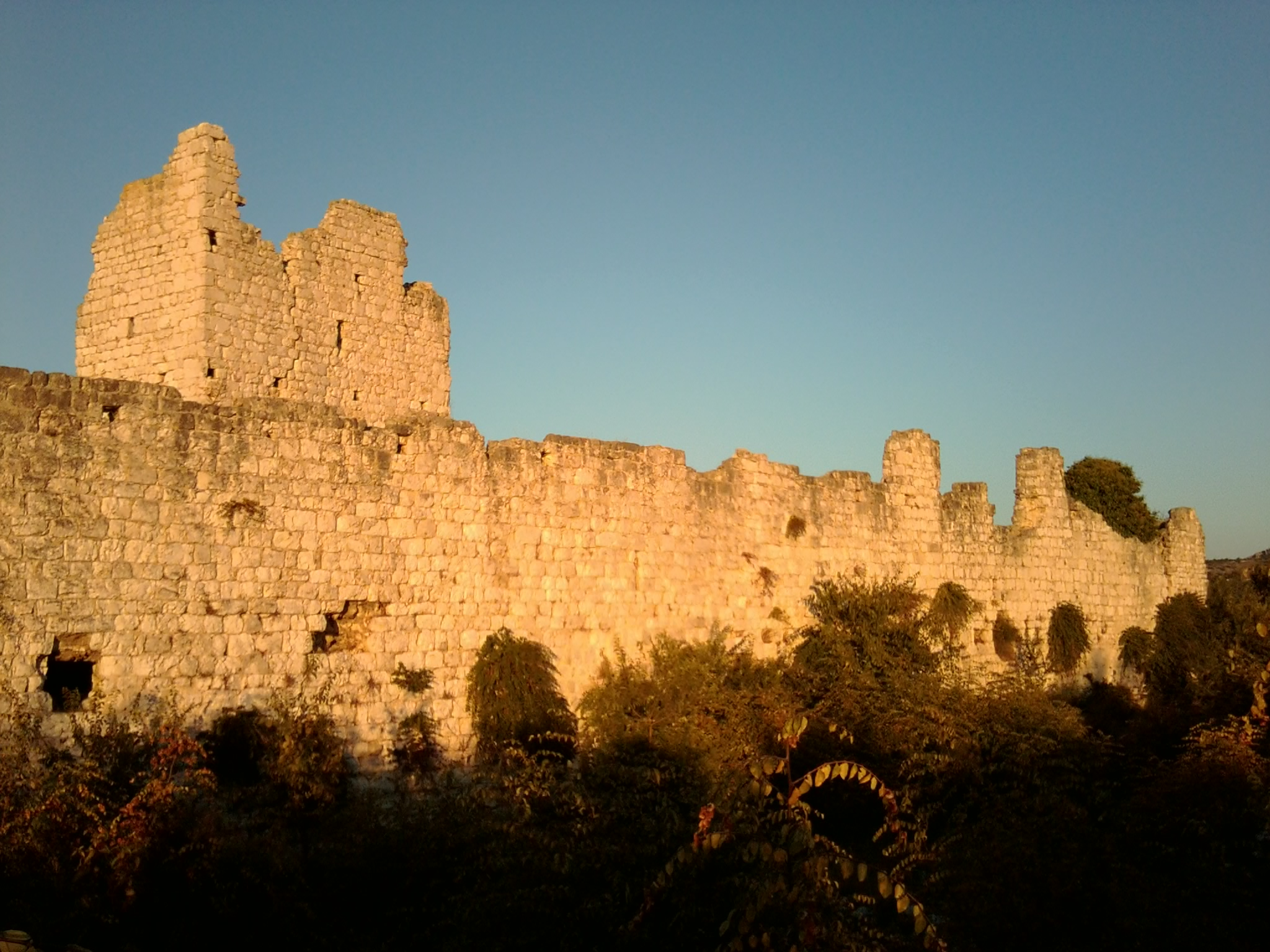
- Remains of monastery walls and tower.
- Interactive map of Priory of Vrana

Monastery information
- Other names: Stari grad Vrana, Gradina
- Order: Benedictines Holy See Knights Templars Knights Hospitaller
- Established: 9th century
- Disestablished: 17th century (demolished by Venetians)

The Priory of Vrana (Latin: prioratus Auranae, Hungarian: vránai perjelség, Croatian: vranski priorat) is a ruined monastery near the Croatian town of Vrana. During the medieval period the monastery is mentioned in historical sources since 11th century as fortress of Vrana (castrum Auranae) and Benedictine monastery.

== History ==
=== Background ===
In 1076, Croatian King Demetrius Zvonimir granted the monastery of St. Gregory in Vrana to Pope Gregory VII. The monastery was used as a residence for papal legates visiting Croatia. In the 12th century, the Knights Hospitaller and the Templars had a significant influence in the Kingdom of Croatia. The Templars established the "province of Hungary and Slavonia" in the 1160s, which covered Croatia and the Kingdom of Hungary. Around this period, the Templars gained the Vrana monastery. According to historian Angelo de Benvenuti, it was Hungarian King Béla II who established two Templar priories, the Priory of Bela, in the town of Bela near Varaždin, and the Priory of Vrana which was subordinated to the former. The historian Josip Kolanović considered that it was the Holy See that gave Vrana to the Templars. After Templars took over the complex, the monastery was fortified by strong three-layered walls, moat and a drawbridge, whose remains are visible to this day.

The Hungarian, and later Hungarian-Slavonian priory, was not autonomous langue. Until middle of 13th century and since first third of the 14th century the Italian grand prior was in charge for its affairs, although in many cases it was counted as one of the German "provinces".

The head of priory was equal to the bishops in hierarchy of the order and entitled to permanent seat in the royal council and in the House of Lords. The seat of the priory was in a short period in the Dalmatian town Vrana. After the town fell into Venetian hands in 1409, the priory had nothing to do with Vrana and all of its estates were limited to Hungarian territory.

=== Templar monastery ===
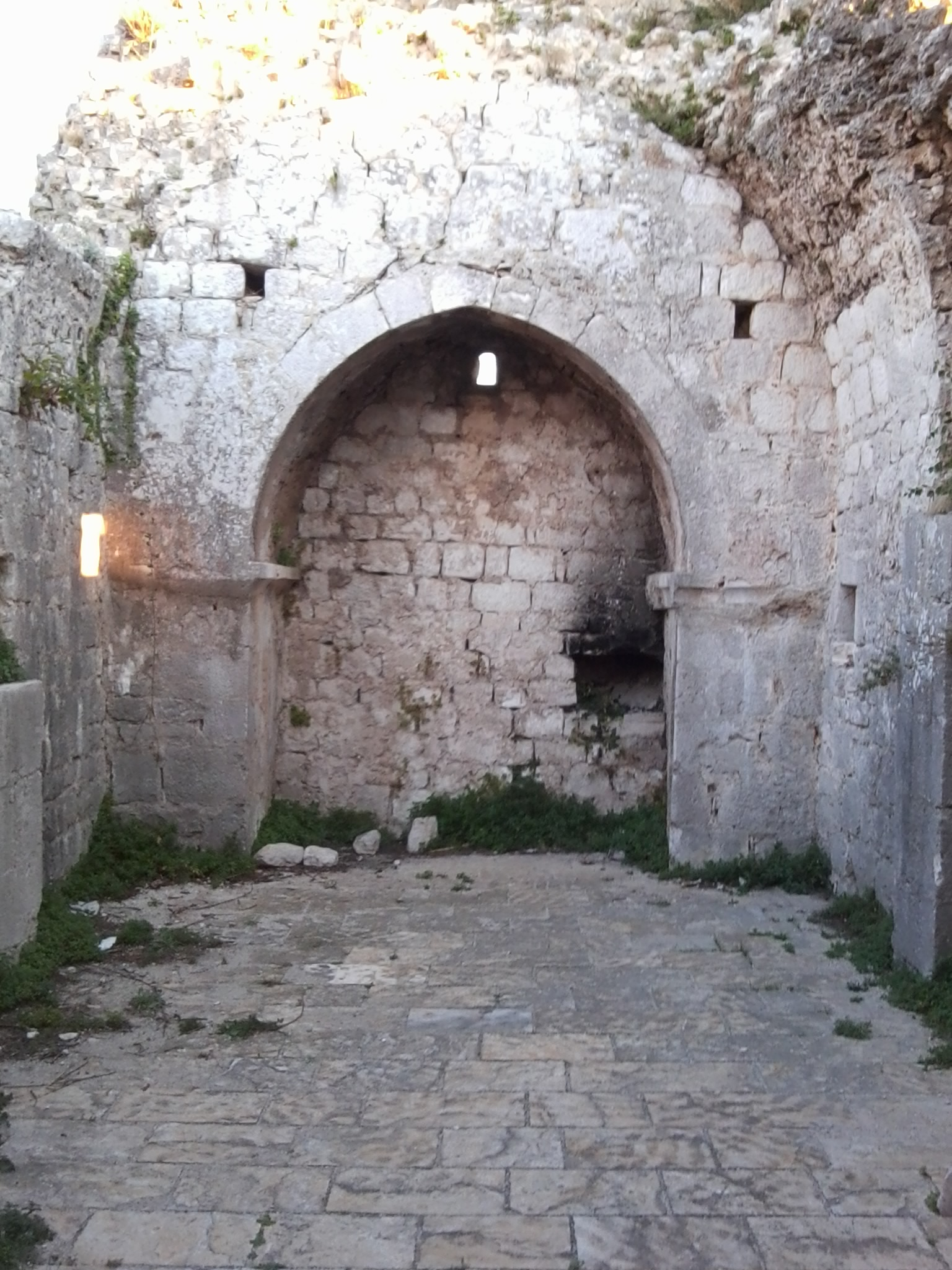
Gothic arch in monastery's chapel remains.

Vrana monastery was the most important possession of Templars in the whole region. The templars improved defence of the monastery by improving its existing fortifications. They expanded its possessions in Dalmatia and Croatia.

Since middle of the 13th century the Hungarian priories of the Knights Hospitalers suffered many blows to their strength. The severe blow to their strength was anarchy in period at the turn of 13th and 14th century. After the Chinon Parchment in 1308 and Vox in excelso in 1312 the houses and other property of Templars were transferred to the Knight Hospitalers, including the Priory of Vrana, which gained a predominant role among Hungarian priories.

=== Under control of Hungarian Knights Hospitalers ===
After taking the priory of Vrana from Templars, the Hungarian perceptories of the Order of Hospitallers established it as their priory.

Around 1380, when the Western Schism began, Hungarian king Louis I of Hungary appointed Croatian knight John of Palisna, as prior of Vrana. Since this appointment the King of Hungary appointed all succeeding priors of Vrana. Palisna bear the title of the "Hungarian-Slavonian prior" since 1379 although he was officially appointed as prior only in 1382.

The Order of Knights Hospitaller was among the major landowners in the Kingdom of Hungary. On the account of the income from estates given to the priory, the prior was obliged to participate and support the Hungarian king in wars. John of Palisna has participated in the Battle of Kosovo in 1389.

During the 15th century all priories of Vrana were Hungarian noblemen, not knights but secular persons, appointed for a lifetime. At the end of 15th century the priory collected taxes from more than 2,400 households in the territory of Csurgo, Karaševo, Božjakovina, Pakrac, Čaklovac, Lešnik, Rasošja, Trnava, Dubica, Gradačac and many other.

=== Under Venetian control ===
In 1402, troops loyal to Ladislaus of Naples captured Vrana, but Hospitalers still remained inside.However, by 1408, Ladislaus of Naples sold Dalmatia to the Venice, and thus Vrana too came under Venerian rule. Venice held a garrison of some 100 men with 30 horses in Vrana. They had also built additional fortifications around Vrana. After Klis fell to the Ottomans in 1538, the Ottomans also entered Vrana without resistance.

=== Under the Ottoman control ===
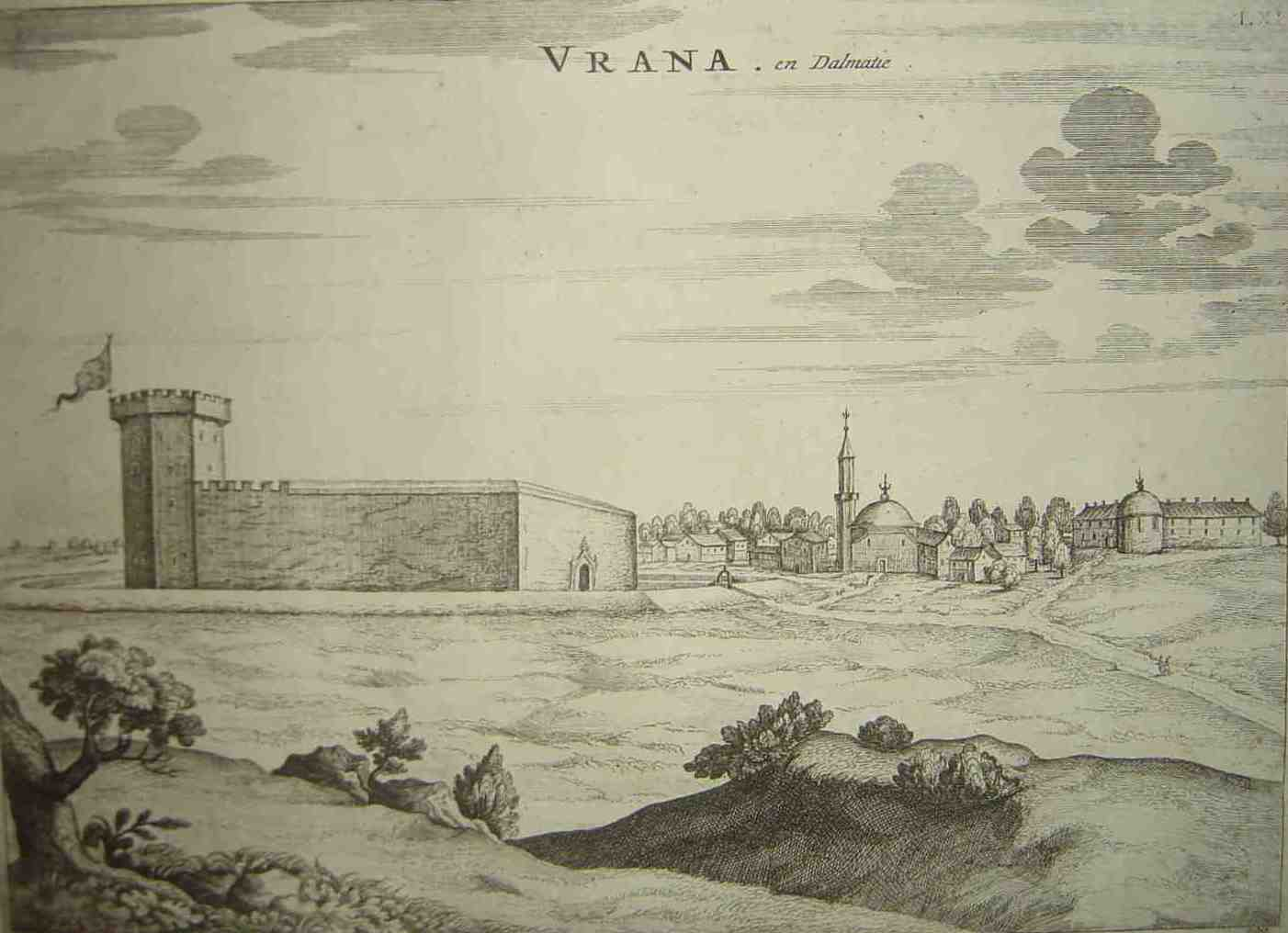
Fortress of Vrana, as it was in the 16th century, while under Ottoman control.

The heart of 1596 plans for the uprising in the eastern Adriatic region was Francesco Antonio Bertucci. According to some suggestions, the main reason for his anti-Ottoman activities were his plans to recapture the Priory of Vrana from the Ottomans. According to Bertucci's plan, the rebels (including Uskoks) would first capture Klis, Herceg Novi and Scutari from the Ottomans. That would trigger a large Ottoman naval expedition on the Adriatic northwards and draw the Venetians, who otherwise refused to join the crusade, to join the alliance against the Ottomans. This plan started with the Battle of Klis in 1596 which ended with brief capture and looting of the Klis and priory.

=== Croatian War of Independence ===
During the Croatian War of Independence, the monastery remains served as defensive outpost for Croatian Army.

== List of priors and other officials ==
=== Twelfth–thirteenth century ===
Term	Incumbent	Monarch	Notes	Source
1186–1193	Martin	Béla III	"preceptor", "prior"	
1208	unknown	Andrew II	"prior"; mentioned without name	
1216	B.	Andrew II	"procurator"	
1216	Pethe	Andrew II	"magister"	
1217	P.	Andrew II	"prior"	
1222	unknown	Andrew II	"prior"; mentioned without name	
1225	unknown	Andrew II	"procurator"; mentioned without name	
1225	Rembald	Andrew II	"procurator"	

=== Fourteenth century ===
Term	Incumbent	Monarch	Notes	Source
c. 1312	Loquetus	Charles I	"magister domorum [...] per Hungariam et Sclavoniam"	
c. 1315	Roland of Gragnana	Charles I	"magister per Hungariam et Sclavoniam"	
c. 1319	Francis of Gragnana	Charles I	"magister cruciferorum domus hospitalis Jerosolimitane, dominus de Gran, procurator per Hungariam et Sclavoniam generalis in persona nostri superioris magni magistri"	

== Sources ==
- C. Tóth, Norbert; Horváth, Richárd; Neumann, Tibor; Pálosfalvi, Tamás (2016). Magyarország világi archontológiája, 1458–1526, I. Főpapok és bárók [Secular Archontology of Hungary, 1458–1526, Volume I: Prelates and Barons] (in Hungarian). MTA Bölcsészettudományi Kutatóközpont Történettudományi Intézete. ISBN 978-963-4160-35-9.
- Engel, Pál (1996). Magyarország világi archontológiája, 1301–1457, I. [Secular Archontology of Hungary, 1301–1457, Volume I] (in Hungarian). História, MTA Történettudományi Intézete. ISBN 963-8312-44-0.
- Engel, Pál (2001). The Realm of St Stephen: A History of Medieval Hungary, 895–1526. I.B. Tauris Publishers. ISBN 1-86064-061-3.
- Hunyadi, Zsolt (2002). "Cruciferi domus hospitalis per Hungáriám et Sclavoniam... A johanniták Magyarországon a 14. század végéig [Cruciferi domus hospitalis per Hungáriám et Sclavoniam... The Hospitallers in Hungary up to the End of the Fourteenth Century]". Aetas. 17 (4). AETAS Könyv- és Lapkiadó Egyesület: 52–76. ISSN 0237-7934.
- Krokar, James P. (1973). "New Means to an Old End: Early Modern Maps in the Service of an Anti-Ottoman Crusade". Imago Mundi. 60: 23–38. doi:10.1080/03085690701669277.
- Hunyadi, Zsolt; Laszlovszky, J¢zsef (1 January 2001). The Crusades and the Military Orders: Expanding the Frontiers of Medieval Latin Christianity. Central European University Press. ISBN 978-963-9241-42-8.
- Burgtorf, Jochen; Nicholson, Helen J. (2006). International Mobility in the Military Orders (twelfth to Fifteenth Centuries): Traveling on Christ's Business. University of Alabama Press. ISBN 978-0-8173-1512-2.
- Kolanović, Josip (1971). "Vrana i Templari". In Novak, Grga; Maštrović, Vjekoslav (eds.). Povijest Vrane. Institut Jugoslavenske akademije znanosti i umjetnosti.
- Sire, Henry J. A. (1994). "The priory of Vrana: the Order of St John in Croatia". In Upton-Ward, Judi (ed.). The Military Orders: On land and by Sea. Ashgate Publishing, Ltd. ISBN 9780754662877.
