= Topolovica, Bjelovar-Bilogora County =

Topolovica
- Village
- Location within Croatia
- Coordinates: 45°46′57″N 17°13′37″E
- Country: Croatia
- County: Bjelovar-Bilogora County
- Municipality: Veliki Grđevac

Area
  - Total: 2.9 sq mi (7.6 km^{2})
- Elevation: 486 ft (148 m)

Population (2021)
  - Total: 20
  - Density: 6.8/sq mi (2.6/km^{2})
- Time zone: UTC+1 (CET)
  - Summer (DST): UTC+2 (CEST)
- Postal code: 43270 Veliki Grđevac
- Area code: 043
- Vehicle registration: DA

Topolovica is a village in the municipality Veliki Grđevac, Bjelovar-Bilogora County in Croatia.

== Demographics ==
According to the 2021 census, its population was 20.

According to the 2001 census, there were 14 inhabitants in 7 family households.
