= Hungarian–Ottoman War (1437–1442) =

Conflict in the Balkans

- Part of Hungarian–Ottoman Wars
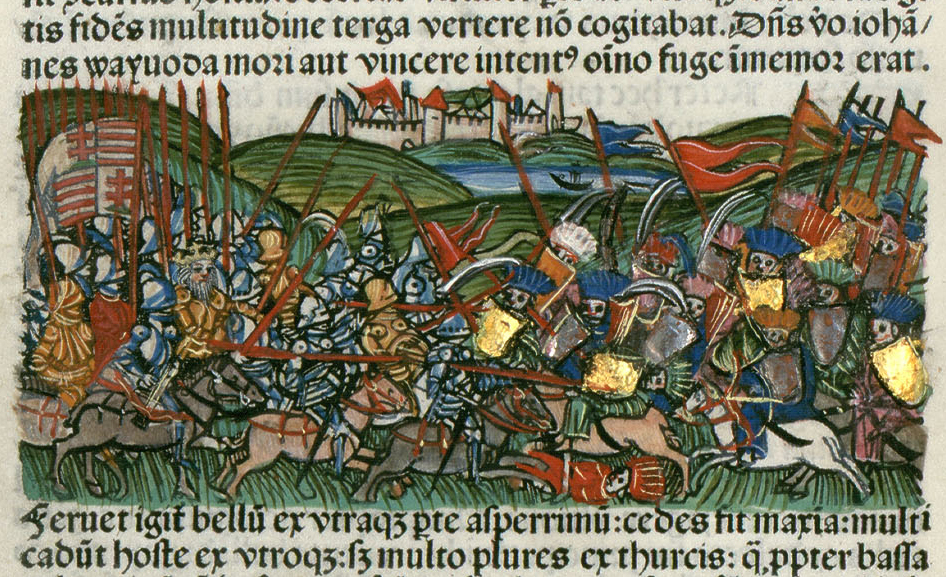
- Battle of the Iron Gates
| Date | 1437–1442 |
| Location | Smederevo, Belgrade, Sibiu, Iron Gates, Balkans, Kingdom of Hungary |
| Result | Hungarian victory |
| Territorial changes | The Ottoman Empire temporarily loses control of Principality of Wallachia |

Belligerents
| Kingdom of Hungary; Kingdom of Croatia; Serbian Despotate; Kingdom of Poland; Taborites; Principality of Wallachia Basarab side | Ottoman Empire; Principality of Wallachia Vlad's side |

Commanders and leaders
| Sigismund # Albrecht # John Hunyadi; Nicholas of Ilok; Michael Ország; Stephen Rozgonyi; Ivan Talovac; Franko Talovac; Đurađ Branković; Lazar Branković; Władysław III; Jan Jiskra of Brandýs (Wallachia) Basarab II | (Ottoman Empire) Murad II (Ottoman Empire) Şehabeddin Pasha (Ottoman Empire) Isa Bey (Ottoman Empire) Ali Bey (Ottoman Empire) Mezid Bey † (Wallachia) Vlad II |

Strength
| 1437–1442: 30,000–32,000+ (Note: 12,000 Transylvanian campaign of 1438 3,000-5,000 Siege of Belgrade (1440) 15,000 Battle of the Ialomița) | 1437–1442: 90,000–151,000+ (Note: 20,000 Transylvanian campaign of 1438 35,000 Siege of Belgrade (1440) 16,000 Battle of the Iron Gate 19,000–80,000 Battle of the Ialomița) |

Casualties and losses
| Total : 3,000+ (Note: 3,000 Battle of the Iron Gate Heavy casualties Battle of the Ialomița) | Total : 100,000–117,000+ (Note: 40,000 Battle of Smederevo (1437) 17,000 Siege of Belgrade (1440) 15,000–20,000 Battle of the Iron Gate 28,000–40,000 Battle of the Ialomița) |
- 70,000 Hungarian civilians enslaved

The Hungarian–Ottoman War (1437–1442) was the seventh confrontation between the Kingdom of Hungary and the Ottoman Empire in the Balkans. The war ended with a Hungarian victory after a decisive clash at Iron Gates in 1442 where the Hungarian forces under John Hunyadi's command defeated a large Ottoman army.

== Background ==
The Ottoman commanders, continuously pressured Sultan Murad II to take decisive action against the princes along the Danube and later against Hungary. Among these commanders, Isa Bey Ishaković stood out as the most influential, commanding troops on the Serbian border. He accused King Sigismund of Luxembourg and Đurađ Branković of instigating rebellions in Anatolia. Eventually, Murad yielded to the demands of these instigators and, in early 1437, demanded the surrender of Szendrő from Branković. However, Branković refused and instead fortified the castle, entrusting its defense to his son while fleeing with his youngest son, Lazar Branković, and their wealth to their estates in Hungary.

== War ==
=== Siege of Smederevo (1437) ===
Murad, aiming to catch Branković off guard with a swift advance, marched towards Serbia with a large army before June and besieged Smederevo. Thanks to Brankovic's valiant defense, relief troops managed to arrive in time. Lawrence Héderváry, the newly appointed Palatine of Hungary, ordered the Hungarian army under Pongrácz of Szentmiklós to intervene near Belgrade upon learning of the danger. In late June, several thousand Taborite mercenaries hired by Sigismund in Bohemia joined this army, sailing down the Danube under John Jiskra of Brandýs' command from Pozsony to join the conflict. With this reinforcement, Pongrácz secretly approached Smederevo in early July and achieved a surprising victory over Murad's army. John Hunyadi's Transylvanian auxiliary troops also played a crucial role, arriving just in time to contribute to the success.

It is rumored that the Ottomans suffered 40,000 casualties in the battle, prompting the remaining forces to hastily retreat from Serbia. Detailed records of the battle's course are lacking, but it is believed that Hunyadi's strategic brilliance and leadership were instrumental in the victory. Meanwhile, another hostile group invaded Transylvania but was defeated by László Csáki, the victorious voivode, and his forces. Sigismund, dealing with the Hussite Wars in Prague at the time, learned of the victory on July 17 through four captured enemy leaders sent to him by the palatine.

Murad II's failure at Smederevo in 1437 haunted him, prompting immediate action upon his return from Asia Minor to Europe in the summer of 1438. He mobilized to invade the Banat of Severin and Transylvania. Leading an Ottoman raiding army, Ali Bey Evrenosoğlu, the son of Evrenos, who had faced defeat in the 1432 invasion, marched forward with the voluntary assistance of Vlad II Dracul, the Wallachian voivode disloyal to Hungary. The Ottoman-Wallachian forces crossed the Danube at Szörényvár, advancing through Orșova-Karánsebes and the Iron Gates, encountering significant resistance near Sebeș. While Vlad Dracul persuaded the citizens to surrender, an unnamed Hungarian nobleman retreated with his family to a city tower, preparing for a determined defense. Despite their efforts, the Turks failed to take the tower by storm and resorted to setting a large fire around it. Upon finding no signs of life, the enemy assumed great treasures were hidden within. However, they discovered only a 16-year-old survivor, who, after 20 years of enslavement, vividly recounted his experiences and insights into Ottoman customs and morals upon his return to his homeland.

Part of the enemy force retreated from Sebeș to Mediaș, capturing it, while the rest besieged Sibiu. Thanks to the valiant defense, the Turks, after eight days of futile attempts, turned towards Transylvania. After devastating the suburbs of Brașov, they departed through the Törzburg Pass, leaving behind a trail of plunder and 70,000 unfortunate captives. Upon hearing of the invasion, Desiderius Losonci, the Transylvanian voivode, ordered mobilization, but the nobility's reluctance to fulfill their defense duties forced him to prioritize evacuating people and livestock from the affected regions. After the enemy withdrawal, the voivode sought to punish lords and nobles who failed to take up arms, but Queen Elizabeth of Luxembourg's pardon upon her return from Bohemia spared them and restored their estates.

With the looming threat of an Ottoman invasion the following year, the country's estates urged Albert II to return from negotiations in Wrocław. Only John Hunyadi, distinguished in battles against the Hussites, was sent back with a significant army to defend the southern territories. Despite repeated calls, Albert's return was delayed until after he suffered a leg injury during a carnival celebration. His late return in March was met with reproaches from the divided national estates amidst growing Ottoman threats. Following the diet of Buda, Albert promptly took action to protect the southern regions as the Turks had indeed carried out their threats from the previous year, pouring a massive army into Serbia, raising concerns of an invasion into Hungarian territory.

The Banat of Severin was deemed the most vulnerable part of the country due to its elongated shape, exposing it to enemy attacks from the east, under Ottoman control in Wallachia, as well as from the south and west. Albert had already dispatched John Hunyadi and his brother, who had shown prowess in military matters, to this strategically crucial region. Additionally, citing the severity of the threat, he called upon the nobility to take up arms, with Szeged and the lower Tisza region designated as rallying points for the army. However, compliance with the diet's resolution was slow and reluctant, mainly because the poorer nobles, oppressed by the magnates, sought to shift the burden of military service onto the king, arguing that the danger could be repelled by royal banners and hired mercenaries.

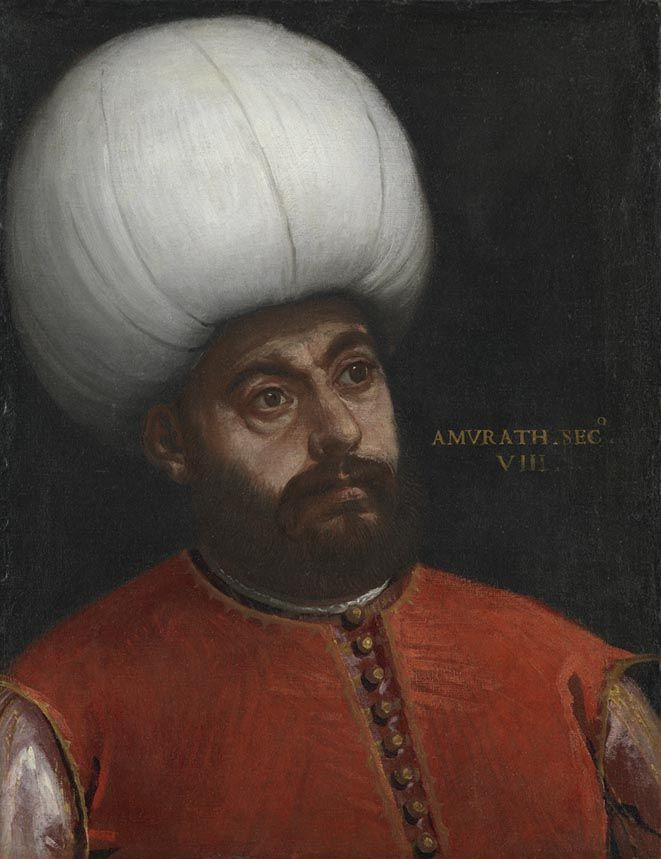
Sultan Murad II

=== Murad II's campaign against Serbia ===
However, events soon contradicted these unfounded assumptions. Sultan Murad II set out at the end of May with a formidable army, allegedly numbering 130,000 soldiers, primarily to occupy Serbia, devastating the Morava region. Đurađ Branković, the Serbian despot, aware of Murad's merciless nature, followed the same tactic as in 1437, he fled to Hungary with his younger son and whatever treasures he could gather, entrusting the defense of his country, especially the fortress of Smederevo, to his son. The Ottoman army, after occupying the Morava region of Serbia in June, immediately began the siege of Smederevo. Meanwhile, some raiding parties, crossing the Danube, harassed the population of Hungary up to the region around Timișoara, which the Hunyadi brothers, with their forces from the Banat of Severin, could barely contain.

This was the situation when the king and queen arrived at the camp near Szeged at the end of July, where they learned that the troops called to arms were only slowly assembling, and within their ranks, there was a high degree of indiscipline and dissatisfaction. The surviving records indicate that although the nobility, the Serbian despot, bishops from Veszprém, Vác, and Syrmia eagerly joined the royal pair with their armies, the lower nobility and county militias, seeing the arbitrary departure of the magnates, no longer considered themselves obligated to fight and dispersed. Only about 6,000 men remained in the king's camp under the leadership of Michael Ország, Stephen Rozgonyi, and the two Hunyadis. With this force, Albert intended to reinforce the border fortresses, especially Belgrade, Petrovaradin, Stari Slankamen, and Ilok, while he himself planned to return home. Before leaving Titel, he held a war council with the surrounding magnates and nobles, where they decided to renew the campaign against the Ottomans the following year. Albert promised at this time that he would personally organize and lead the army to be raised, and the 31 nobles present at the council pledged to fully support the king in collecting the aforementioned tax. They also agreed that anyone who dared to oppose it would face punishment by forfeiture of life and property.

After this, Albert, already affected by the prevailing contagion in the camp, returned to Buda. Here, he soon fell seriously ill, exacerbated by his attempts to quench his burning thirst with excessive consumption of watermelons. His illness increasingly filled him with an irresistible desire to revisit Vienna, the place of his birth and happy childhood, but he became so ill in Neszmély on the way there that, sensing his imminent death, he managed to draft his last will and testament. Four days later, on October 27, 1439, he died. In his will, he designated his unborn child, if his wife gave birth to a son, as his successor, entrusting the guardianship of the child to a council composed of three Hungarian, three Czech, and two Austrian magnates, and a representative from the city of Prague, with Pressburg designated as the residence of the successor. He did not favor his wife, Elizabeth, whom he knew to be capricious, weak, and conniving, and therefore unsuitable for governance, as his successor on the Hungarian, Austrian, and Czech thrones. He did not consider it acceptable that, amidst such difficult and complex circumstances, with the three countries at odds with each other and the throne, they should fall under the capricious rule of a weak, biased, and easily influenced woman. In contrast, in the event of the birth of a son, the dying king at least hoped that the alliance of the three heterogeneous countries would remain viable.

=== Władysław III of Poland becomes king of Hungary ===
On the feast day of St. Alexis, King Władysław headed to the church of Alba Regalis early on Sunday morning. Upon arrival, he found the church already bustling with a large crowd, necessitating the removal of all but the clergy, nobles, and elder knights for the smooth execution of the coronation ceremony. Citizens of Buda were also granted entry, as was customary, given their right to partake in armed coronations of Hungarian kings and carry the kingdom's standard. As Cardinal Dionysius, Archbishop of Esztergom, commenced the high mass invoking the Holy Spirit, King Władysław shed his royal garments and received blessings and anointing. He then adorned himself with various regal symbols, each carrying significant historical weight, notably the apostolic cross purportedly given to St. Stephen by the pope in honor of Hungary's embrace of Christianity.

As Elizabeth of Luxembourg repudiated Władysław's claim to Hungary, she had the Holy Crown of Hungary stolen by a lady-in-waiting (Helene Kottanner) from safekeeping at Visegrád for her son, Ladislaus the Posthumous. It was replaced by a reliquary crown for Władysław's coronation. The assembled knighthood, overseeing the ceremony, ensured its solemnity. Following the coronation, Władysław, following tradition, proceeded to the church of Sts. Peter and Paul to administer justice, a symbolic gesture underscoring the primacy of justice in his reign. His subsequent horseback tour around the city, culminating in a display of his readiness to defend Hungary from all threats, further reinforced his commitment to his people's welfare. Returning to the royal castle, Władysław hosted a lavish feast for dignitaries from both realms, concluding the day with joyful celebrations, dances, and games, marking the auspicious beginning of his reign as King of Hungary.

=== First Ottoman Siege of Belgrade ===
As different factions within Hungary clashed with each other domestically, Sultan Murad took advantage of the discord by deploying a substantial force to besiege Belgrade, a critical fortress positioned at the junction of the lower Sava and Danube rivers, in early 1440. Leading the defense of Belgrade was Ivan Talovac, a native of Ragusa. Upon learning of the approaching Turkish army, he engaged them with a portion of his garrison before retreating back into the fortress due to their overwhelming numbers. Sultan Murad II then laid siege to the fortress, surrounding it both by land and from the Danube with a fleet of about 100 ships. Despite breaching the walls using cannons and heavy machinery, the Turks faced staunch resistance from Ivan Talovac and his determined defenders, who repelled their attacks for weeks. Talovac's effective use of artillery, as described by contemporary accounts, played a crucial role in thwarting the Turkish onslaught. Frustrated by the lack of progress, Sultan Murad attempted to bribe the garrison into surrendering, but the Hungarians remained steadfast in their loyalty and courage. Unable to break their resolve, the Turks resorted to digging a tunnel beneath the walls, a plan that was foiled by Talovac's counter-tunneling and a strategically timed explosion that decimated the enemy forces underground.

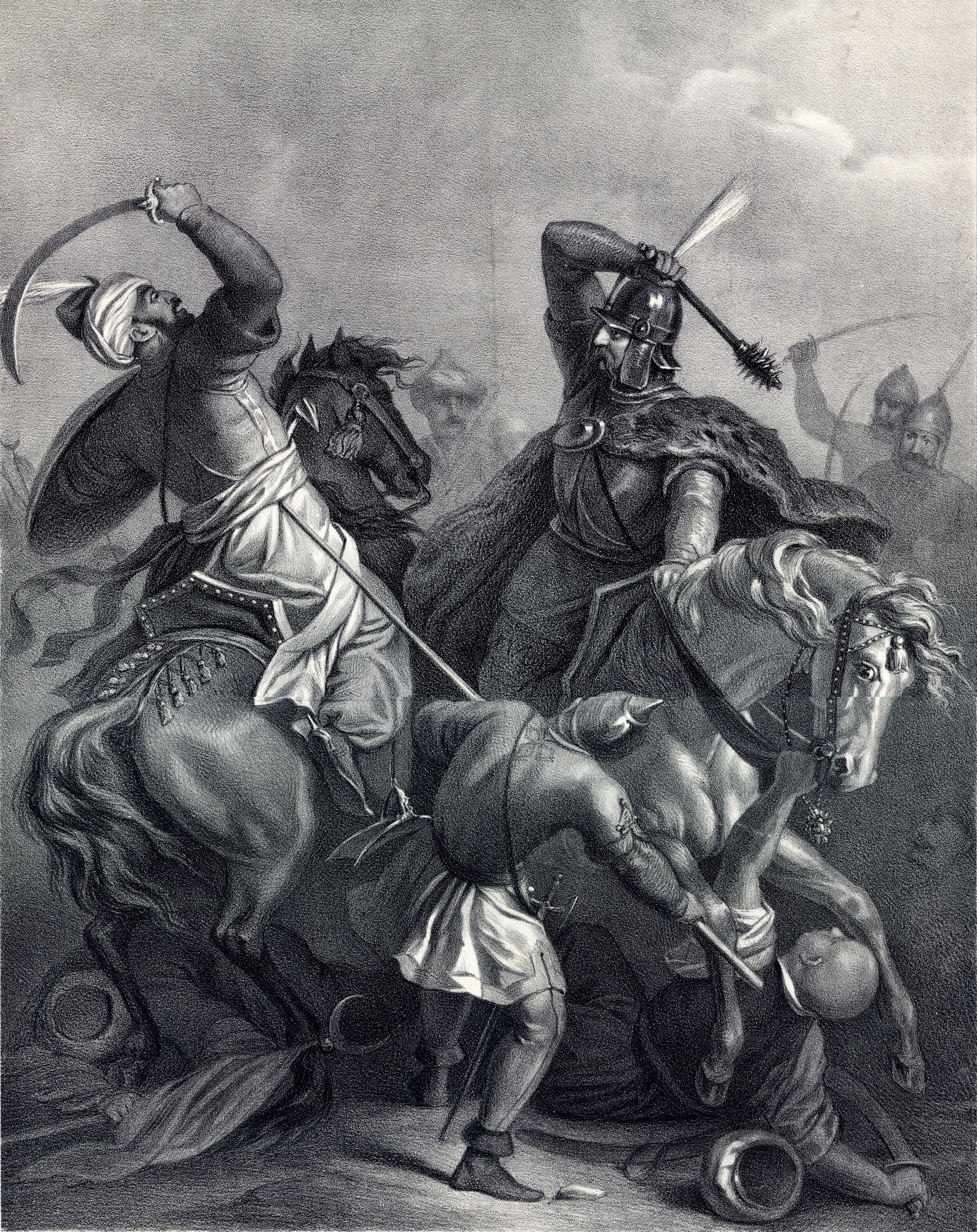
John Hunyadi in battle against the Ottomans

Despite efforts by King Władysław III of Poland envoy to halt the siege, Sultan Murad intensified his attacks, both on land and water. However, the defenders' skill and determination once again prevailed, repelling the Ottoman forces with devastating losses. The sultan, faced with mutiny among his troops, eventually ordered a retreat, concealing the defeat by offering to hand over Belgrade voluntarily as a sign of friendship. With the failed siege behind him, Sultan Murad returned to Adrianople from Belgrade with a host of captives, marking a significant setback in his campaign. Following the conflict at Szeged, John Hunyadi refrained from direct involvement in the recent internal disputes. King Władysław entrusted him with the defense of the southern regions, appointing him as Ban of Severin, Count of Temes, and Voivode of Transylvania, while also assigning him the role of Captain of the Plains. In light of his new responsibilities, Hunyadi established his main headquarters at Belgrade, which faced constant harassment from Ottoman forces in the surrounding area. Despite frequent incursions, Hunyadi successfully repelled the invaders, even as some of their raiding parties crossed the Sava and Danube rivers.

When Isa Bey Ishaković, the commander of Szendrő Castle, entertained the idea of seizing Belgrade, despite the fortress's reputation for withstanding previous assaults, Hunyadi took action. Calling upon his ally Nicholas of Ilok in Transylvania, they mobilized Ilok's regiment and a significant portion of Belgrade garrison to confront the impending threat. Their encounter occurred near Császártöltés, marked by the telltale smoke of burning villages signaling the enemy's approach. Despite an initial push from Isa Bey vanguard that drove back the Hungarian front lines, Hunyadi and Ilok's heavy cavalry stood firm, eventually launching a powerful counter-offensive. Their determined assault shattered the Turkish main force, causing Isa's ranks to falter and ultimately leading to a breakthrough in the enemy's lines.

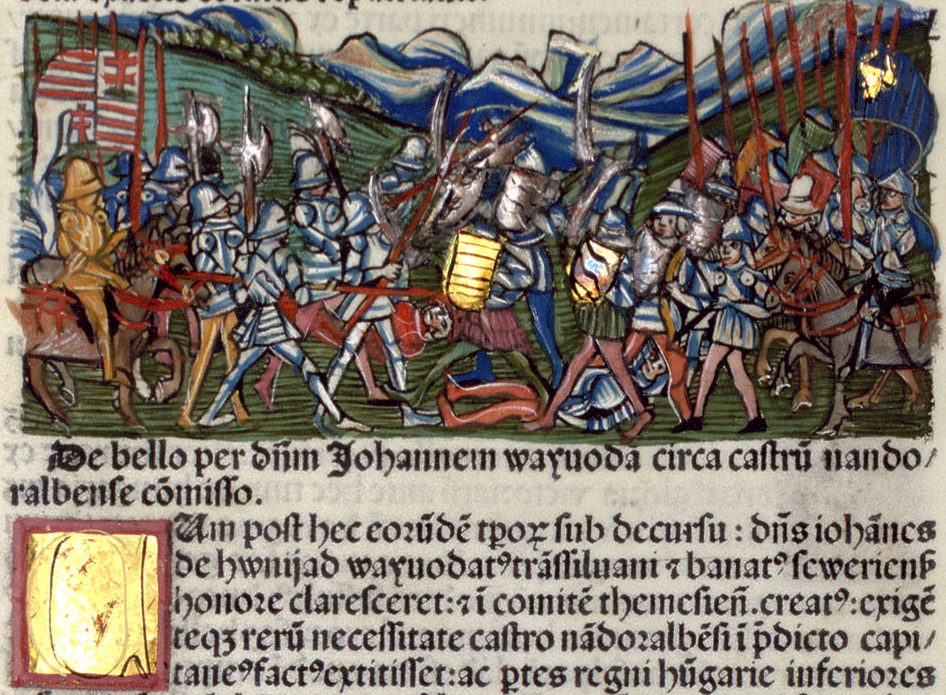
Battle between John Hunyadi and Ottomans after the siege of Belgrade

Faced with mounting casualties and a precarious position, Isa Bey ordered a retreat. However, the withdrawal quickly devolved into chaos as his troops fell into disorder, pursued relentlessly by Hunyadi's forces all the way to Szendrő. Having routed the enemy, Hunyadi returned to Belgrade with captives and plunder seized from the defeated foe. Furious over the recent setback at Belgrade, Sultan Murad took decisive action in the spring of 1442 by dispatching Mezid Pasha, one of his seasoned commanders, with a formidable army comprising mainly European sipahis, estimated at around 80,000 soldiers by historians. Their mission extended beyond mere conquest, it aimed at pillaging and seizing riches. Upon receiving word of the Turkish advance, Nicholas of Ilok, rallied the Transylvanian nobility to arms and alerted John Hunyadi, stationed at Belgrade, of the imminent threat. Aware of the vulnerability along the Danube-Sava line, Hunyadi personally journeyed to Transylvania without a retinue. However, upon his arrival at Alba Iulia, the designated rendezvous point, Ottoman raiding parties had already ravaged the upper Maros River valley, leaving Ilok with meager armed support. Many, fatigued by relentless storms, failed to mobilize in time, while others, caught off guard by the sudden enemy incursion, couldn't reach the assembly point, falling prey to marauding Turkish bands en route or during their preparations at home. In such dire circumstances, Hunyadi found himself perplexed in Alba Iulia when reports arrived of returning Turkish forces emerging from the Maros area in small contingents.

=== Confusion over the location of the 1442 battles ===
The battle in Transylvania within the Kingdom of Hungary between Hunyadi and Mezid Bey: Older historiography places at Szeben, while modern historiography places the battle at the Iron Gate Pass (Vaskapu in Hungarian).

The battle between Hunyadi and Şehabeddin Pasha: Older historiography places at the Iron Gate Pass in Transylvania, while modern historiography places the battle at the Ialomiţa River in Wallachia. The exact place is still a matter of much debate among historians. American historian John Jefferson suggests a battlefield on the Danube near the modern town of Călărași in southern Romania.

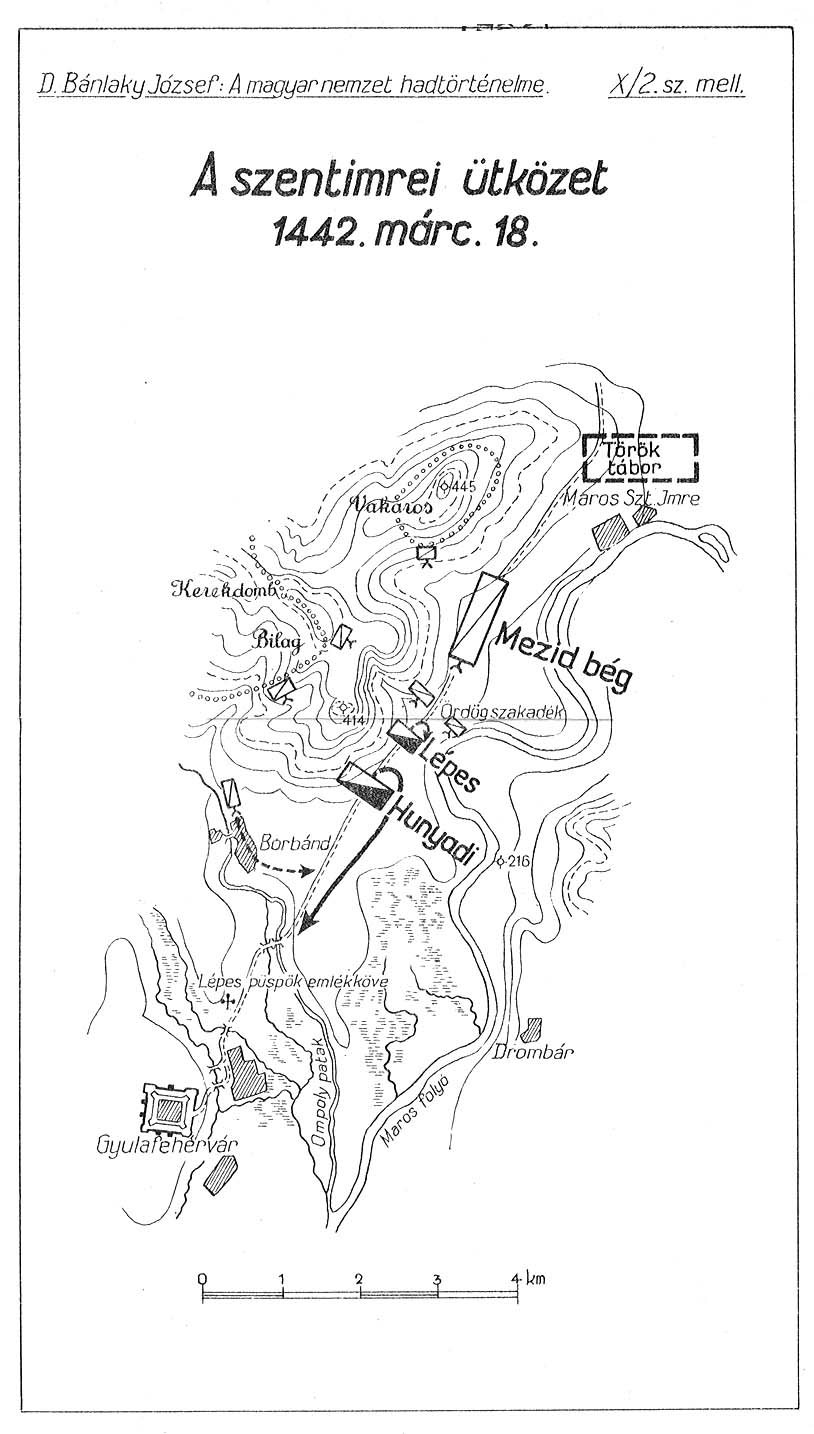
Battle of Santimbru

=== Battle of Marosszentimre ===
György Lépes, the valiant bishop of Transylvania, urged Hunyadi, typically composed and calculated in his actions, to seize the moment and confront the Turks with their modest forces. Driven by their initial fervor rather than strategic deliberation, Hunyadi and Lépes hastily assembled their troops, motivated more by the pursuit of glory than the disparity in enemy numbers, and launched an audacious attack against the Ottoman forces. Upon reaching the Ampoi Creek, the Ottoman vanguard was spotted near Alba Iulia, prompting Lépes to initiate an assault. The initial skirmish favored the Hungarians, compelling the enemy vanguard to hastily retreat towards Sântimbru. Lépes pursued them fervently, with Hunyadi closely following suit. As they approached the Ravine, Lépes encountered fresh enemy reinforcements, prompting Hunyadi to recognize the imminent arrival of Mezid Pasha's main force. Faced with overwhelming odds and the encroaching threat on their flanks and rear, Hunyadi wisely opted against engagement, ordering a strategic retreat. With most of his forces, he successfully broke through the Turkish encirclement, but tragically, Lépes, dismounted during the crossing of the Ampoi, fell victim to the relentless pursuit of the Turks. Mezid Pasha opted not to pursue the retreating Hungarians towards Alba Iulia. Instead, he redirected his forces towards Sibiu, laying siege to the city with the intent of seizing its riches.

=== Siege of Hermannstadt ===
Following the unsuccessful initial assault on Sibiu, Mezid Pasha opted to besiege and systematically bombard the city. However, the inhabitants of Sibiu and the fortress garrison, fully aware of the grim fate awaiting them if the enemy prevailed, mounted a fierce defense, thwarting the Turks at every turn. Upon learning of this, Hunyadi expedited the mobilization of forces stationed at Alba Iulia. Accompanied by Nicholas of Ilok, he set out on March 23, 1442, to relieve Sibiu. Though the army under his command was not large, it was courageous and determined, under Hunyadi's firm leadership. Some units were armed with firearms, and cannons accompanied the army. Upon hearing of Hunyadi's approach, the overconfident Mezid allegedly exclaimed in joy:

Let John come, our victory will be even greater!

=== Battle of the Iron Gate ===
Mezid was determined to capture Hunyadi, already a feared figure among Turkish troops, and offered substantial rewards for his capture, dead or alive. Upon learning of Mezid Pasha's intentions, Hunyadi devised a plan to turn the situation to his advantage. He entrusted his attire, arms, and horse to Simon Kemény for the upcoming battle, ensuring Kemény's safety as much as possible. Additionally, he assigned 500 distinguished warriors as a personal guard to Kemény and entrusted him with command, while Hunyadi himself, leading the heavy cavalry, remained in reserve nearby. As Mezid Pasha advanced with his forces, neglecting the weaker forces left to observe Sibiu, the exact location of their battle formation cannot be determined. However, the battle took place near a village close to Sibiu, most likely in the vicinity of modern-day Malá Tŕňa, where the terrain favored cavalry combat. At the outset of the battle, it became clear that the majority of Turkish forces were pressing towards Kemény's group, indicating the Turkish leadership's singular focus on capturing the presumed leader.

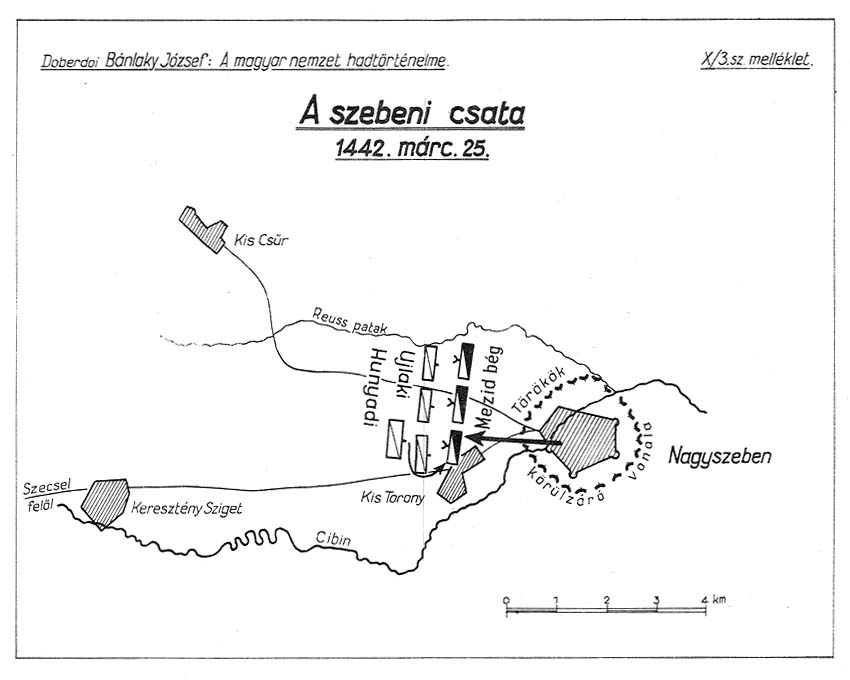
Battle of Hermannstadt

As the battle unfolded around Kemény, Hunyadi led his reserves and broke through the flank of the large enemy mass engaged with Kemény's group. Simultaneously, the citizens of Sibiu liberated Hungarian prisoners from the Ottoman camp and attacked the enemy rear. Despite threats from all sides, the Ottoman army persisted, exerting immense force on Kemény. However, the cheers of the Turks upon Kemény's fall soon turned to cries of distress as Hunyadi and the citizens of Sibiu ruthlessly decimated them. Surrounded on three sides, the Ototman army found itself in dire straits. The confusion escalated when Mezid Pasha and his son fell, allegedly slain by László Cserei. With their leaders gone, the resistance of the Turkish army waned, intensifying the Hungarian slaughter. Eventually, the remaining troops fled in disarray. The victors seized the entire camp, laden with treasures and spoils, and freed all the prisoners gathered by the raiding parties in Transylvania. Hungarian light cavalry pursued the fleeing Turks to the mountains, leaving Turkish corpses strewn along the road. Medieval writers estimate the number of fallen Turks at 20,000, while the Hungarians lost only 3,000 men.

Mezid Pasha's defeat in Sibiu and the complete surrender of the Wallachian and Moldavian rulers greatly angered and provoked Sultan Murad, who decided to launch a comprehensive punitive campaign against Hungary the following year, intending to lead it personally. To swiftly avenge the defection of the rulers and the setback in Transylvania, Murad entrusted one of his esteemed commanders, Hadım Şehabeddin, with the task of punishing Wallachia and Transylvania, with strict orders not to return until both regions were conquered. Şehabeddin, leading the Rumelian army along with select troops from six Anatolian districts, estimated to be around 80,000 men according to historians, crossed the Danube near Nikopol in June 1442. Dividing his forces into two groups, he wreaked havoc in Wallachia, leaving it virtually desolated. Wallachian voivode Vlad II Dracul, seeing resistance as futile, retreated with his forces into the mountains, where most of the Wallachian population sought refuge.

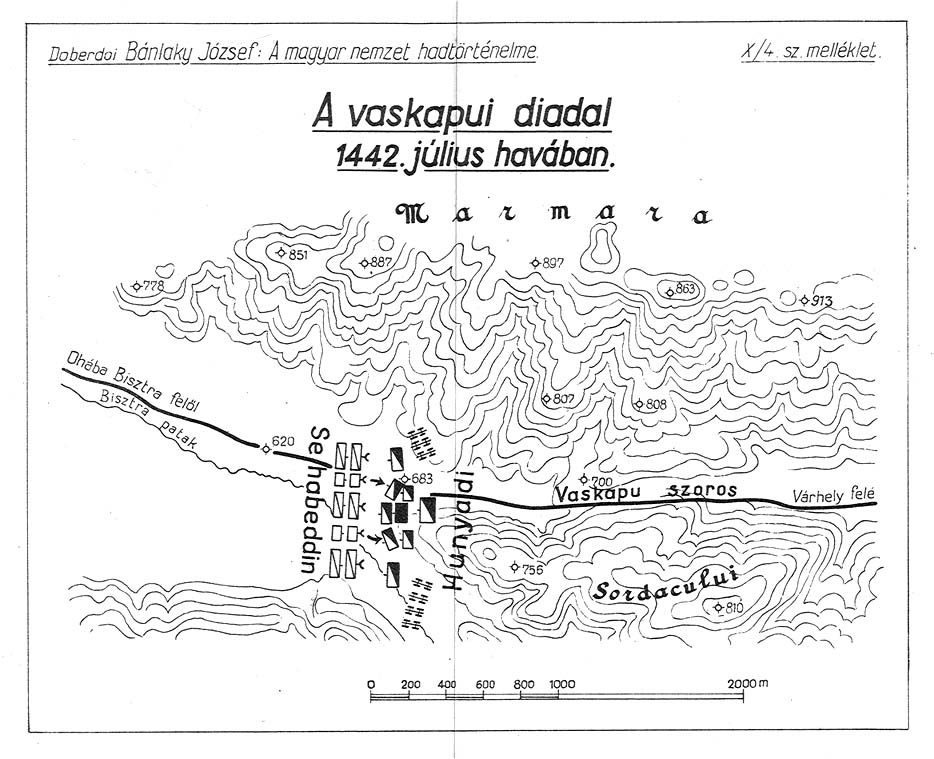
Battle of the Iron Gates

=== Battle of the Ialomiţa ===
After devastating Wallachia, Şehabeddin regrouped his army to march into Transylvania, boasting that merely displaying his turban would make the enemy flee for days. Choosing an alternate route through the Banat of Severin instead of the Transylvanian border mountains, Şehabeddin aimed to enter Transylvania through the Iron Gates. Upon hearing of the Ottoman army's presence in Wallachia, John Hunyadi quickly mobilized Transylvanian forces near Sibiu. Learning that the Ottoman army had diverted towards Orșova, Hunyadi advanced parallel to them along the northern edge of the Transylvanian border mountains, aiming to block their invasion into Transylvania or Hungary, even if it meant a battle of life and death. Though Hunyadi's forces numbered only around 15,000, they were fervent and disciplined warriors inspired by recent victories.

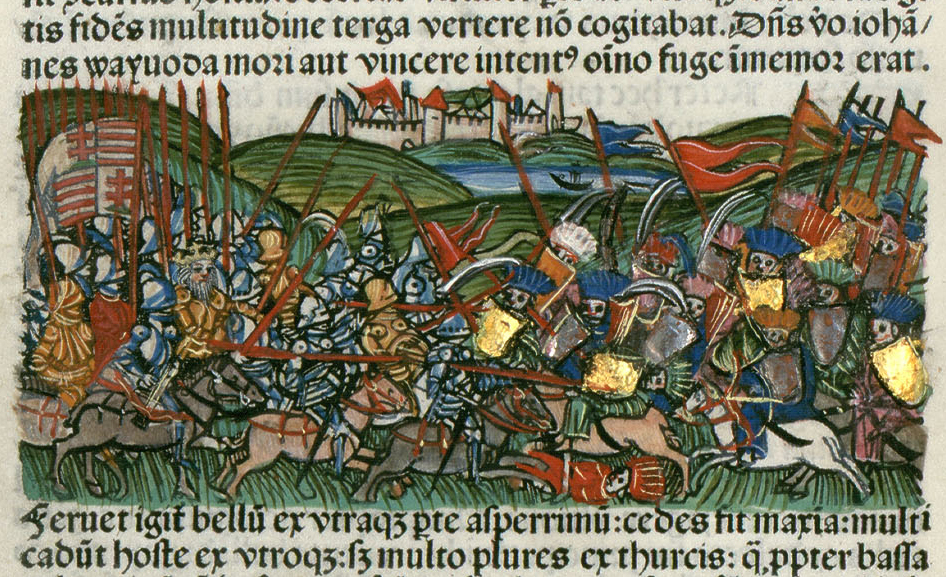
The battle of John Hunyadi at the Iron Gates

The vanguard of both armies likely met near the confluence of the Bistra River into the Timiș. While Sehabeddin's raiding parties encountered minimal resistance, Hunyadi covertly followed the main Ottoman army until they reached a suitable spot. Then, Hunyadi descended from the mountains to block their path, surprising Sehabeddin, who fortified his position east of Orșova and west of Bistra, indicating mutual respect between the commanders. On the day of battle, Hunyadi fervently prayed before leading his forces into an attack, initially targeting the center to break through the enemy's unwieldy masses. Despite initial Ottoman resistance, Hunyadi's strategic maneuvers led to chaos among the Ottoman ranks, culminating in a decisive victory. Sehabeddin and many Ottoman commanders fell, and a significant portion of the Ottoman army perished or were captured.

== Aftermath ==
After regrouping, Hunyadi led his army into Wallachia, dismissing Vlad II Dracul and installing Dan III in his place. He also sent envoys to Władysław III of Poland, offering tribute and complete submission. Returning to Hungary via Bulgaria, Hunyadi further solidified his reputation as a formidable leader. When Sehabeddin set course for Hungary, Sultan Murad attempted peace negotiations with Władysław, but news of Hunyadi's victory dashed any hopes of reconciliation.The Turkish embassy left Buda empty-handed, signaling the triumph of Hunyadi and the Hungarian forces.

== See also ==
- John Hunyadi
- Hungarian–Ottoman War (1415–1419)
- War of the South Danube (1420–1432)
- Crusade of Varna
- Siege of Belgrade (1440)

== Sources ==
- Ágoston, Gábor (2023). The Last Muslim Conquest. The Ottoman Empire and Its Wars in Europe. Princeton: University Press. ISBN 9780691205397.
- Joseph von Aschbach, Geschichte Kaiser Sigmunds, 2012 ISBN 3863825829
- Bánlaky József, A magyar nemzet hadtörténelme, vol 10, Budapest
- Johann Christian Engel, Engel, Geschichte des Ungarischen Reichs, Inktank-Publishing ISBN 9783750105010
- Kupelwieser Leopold, Die Kämpfe Ungarns mit den Osmanen bis zur Schlacht bei Mohács, 1526, Legare Street Press 2023 ISBN 978-1-02-148851-0
- Zinkeisen Johann, Geschichte des osmanischen Reiches in Europa, BiblioBazaar 2009 ISBN 978-1-117-34319-8
- Pesty Frigyes: A Szörényi bánság és Szörény vármegye története, vol 3, Budapest 1878, ISBN 1245156918
- Długosz Jan, Roczniki czyli kroniki sławnego królestwa Polskiego, vol 12 ISBN 9788301160760
- Vjekoslav Kraić, Povjest Hrvata: Dio 1. Treće dova: Vladanje kraljeva iz raznih porodica (1301-1526) 1. knj. Anžuvinci i Sigismund do gubitka Dalmacije (1301-1409), 2010
- Magaš Branka, Croatia Through History: The Making of a European State, 2007 ISBN 9780863567759
- Jefferson, John (2012). The Holy Wars of King Wladislas and Sultan Murad: The Ottoman-Christian Conflict from 1438–1444. Leiden: Brill Publishers. ISBN 978-90-04-21904-5.
- Pálosfalvi, Tamás (2018). From Nicopolis to Mohács: A History of Ottoman-Hungarian Warfare, 1389–1526. The Ottoman Empire and Its Heritage: Politics, Society and Economy 63. Leiden: Brill. ISBN 978-90-04-37565-9.
