= Ahmed Bey Mosque =

Former mosque in Giannitsa, Greece

- Τζαμί Αχμέτ Μπέη
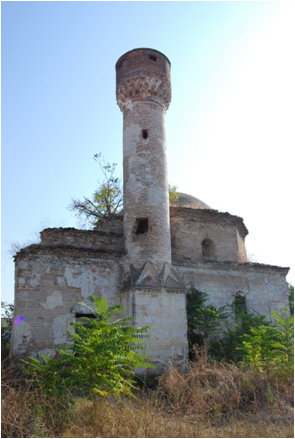
- The mosque in partial ruins

- Location of the former mosque in Greece

Religion
- Affiliation: Islam (former)
- Ecclesiastical or organisational status: Mosque (c. 1540–20th century)
- Status: Closed (in partial ruins)

Location
- Location: Giannitsa, Pella, Central Macedonia
- Country: Greece
- Interactive map of Ahmed Bey Mosque
- Coordinates: 40°47′40″N 22°24′32″E

Architecture
- Type: Mosque
- Style: Ottoman
- Founder: Ahmed Bey
- Completed: c. 1440s

Specifications
- Dome: 1 (partially collapsed)
- Dome height (outer): 7 m (23 ft)
- Minaret: 1
- Minaret height: 15.87 m (52.1 ft)
- Materials: Brick; stone

The Ahmed Bey Mosque (Greek: Τζαμί Αχμέτ Μπέη, from Turkish: Ahmet Bey Camii), also known as the Sheikh Ilahi Mosque (Greek: Τζαμί του Σεΐχη Ιλαχή), is a former mosque in the town of Giannitsa, in Central Macedonia, northern Greece. It was built in the 15th century, during the Ottoman era, by Ahmed Bey, the grandson of Gazi Evrenos, the conqueror of Thrace and Macedonia and founder of the town.

During the 20th century, the mosque was used for profane purposes and it is in very poor condition. Entrance to the former mosque is difficult due to all the plant life that covers it. It is one of the three surviving mosques in Giannitsa today, out of the twenty that existed once.

== History ==
The Ahmed Bey Mosque is one of the oldest mosques in Giannitsa and in Greece overall, built shortly before 1450 or during the second half of the fifteen century. The mosque took its name from one Ahmed Bey, the grandson of Gazi Evrenos who founded the town of Giannitsa. In its early years, it was a great place for pilgrimage as the grave of Sheikh Ilahi, a 15th-century scholar, was located there, along with the tomb of Gazi Evrenos himself. Following his death, Gazi Evrenos received honours similar to those of a saint, and the Muslim inhabitants of Giannitsa adorned his town with several monuments and institutions, such as tekkes, madrasas, and mosques.

In the twentieth century, the mosque was given to the Greek Army to use, which in turn gave it up to the local municipality along with the military camp that rose around it. Access to the mosque is not easy due to the abundant vegetation around and on the building, and perhaps due to this it was only registered as a monument in 1990.

== Architecture ==
The mosque features a simple design, and consists of a square hall prayer, a portico and a minaret. The mosque sports stony zones of three or four rows of bricks that form a building system of incomplete surrounding brick. In its interior the mihrab is preserved, and in some parts its decoration is still visible.

The minaret, which now stands at almost 16 metres, is preserved up to the balcony with the tip missing, but around half of the 7-metre-tall (23 ft) dome collapsed after an explosion in the 1970s; traces of painted decoration are nonetheless still visible.

Half-destroyed and struggling to stand, the mosque is in urgent need of restoration work, which have never been implemented, nor is there any plans for such works in the near future.

== Gallery ==
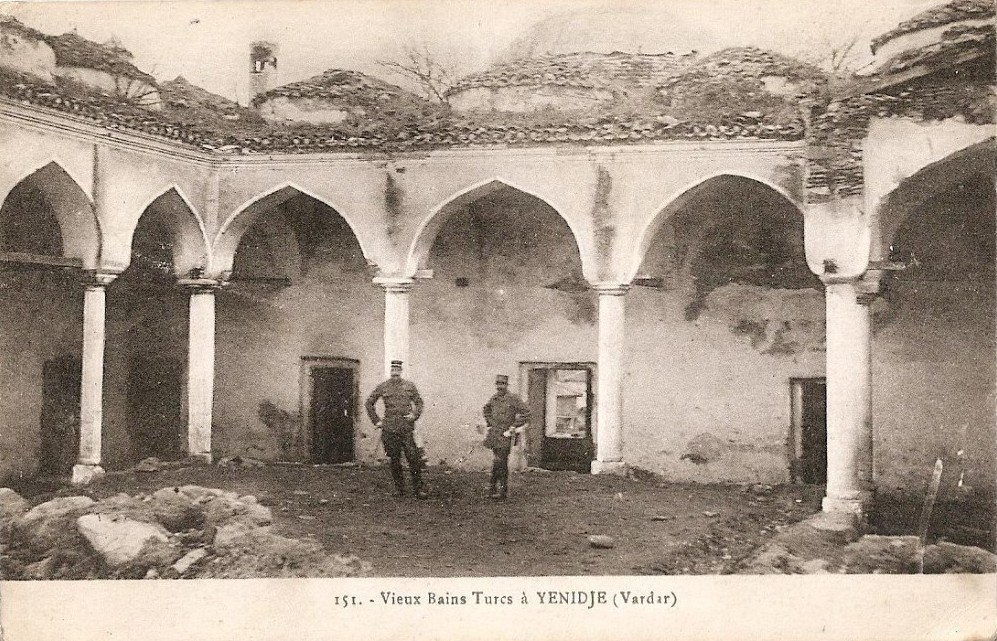
The old madrasa, now destroyed

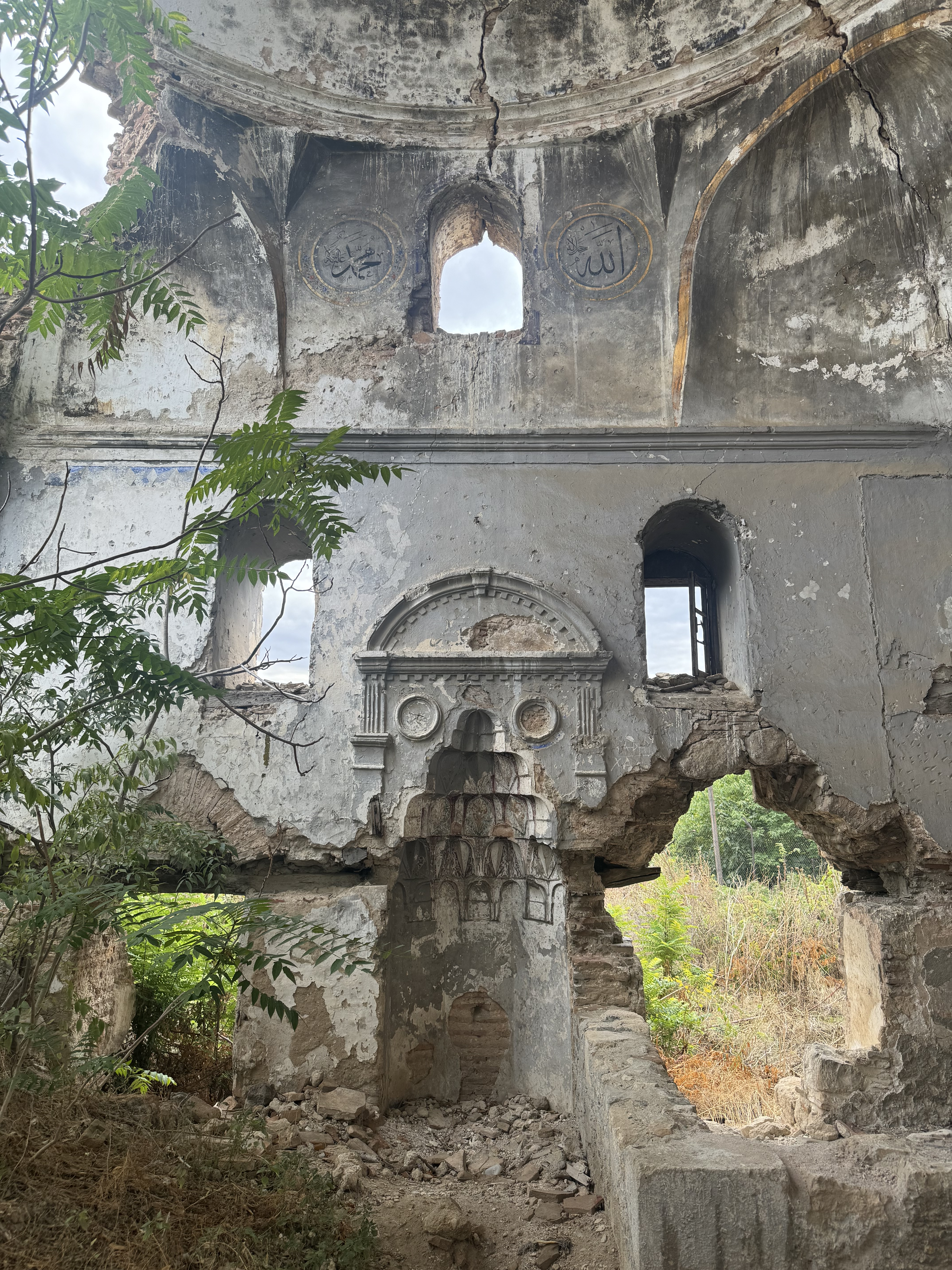
Interior of the mosque

== See also ==
- Islam in Greece
- List of former mosques in Greece
- Ottoman Greece

== Bibliography ==
- Ameen, Ahmed (2017). Islamic architecture in Greece: Mosques. Alexandria: Center for Islamic Civilization studies, Bibliotheca Alexandrina.
- Loukma, Maria; Stefanidou, Maria (2018). "Causes of deterioration of ottoman mosques". Islamic Heritage Architecture and Art II. Vol. 177. Southampton: WIT Press. ISBN 978-1-78466-251-6.
- Loukma, Maria (2019). Τεχνολογία, υλικά δόμησης και παθολογία σε θρησκευτικά κτήρια της οθωμανικής περιόδου [Technology, construction materials and pathology in religious buildings of the Ottoman period] (PDF) (Thesis) (in Greek). Thessaloniki: Aristotle University of Thessaloniki.
- Loukma, Maria; Stefanidou, Maria (2016). The Morphology and Typology of the Ottoman Mosques of Northern Greece (PDF) (Thesis). Greece: Laboratory of Building Materials, Aristotle University of Thessaloniki.
- Skiadaresis, Georgios (2012). The Ottoman monuments of Giannitsa. Ephorate of Antiquities of Pella.
- Stavridopoulos, Ioannis (2015). Μνημεία του άλλου: η διαχείριση της οθωμανικής πολιτιστική κληρονομιάς της Μακεδονίας από το 1912 έως σήμερα [Other People's Monuments: the Management of the Ottoman Cultural Heritage of Macedonia from 1912 to the present] (Thesis) (in Greek). Ioannina: University of Ioannina.
