= Myqerem Janina =

Albanian osmanologist

Mykerem or Myqerem bej Janina (Istanbul, 1890 – Tirana, 1989) was an Albanian osmanologist, whose most remarkable work was the translation of the Hicrî 835 tarihli Sûret-i defter-i sancak-i Arvanid (Copy of register for A.H. 835 in Sanjak of Albania), which had been first published at Ankara, in 1954, by Turkish historian, Halil İnalcık. He has also translated into Albanian several works from the Turkish humorist, Aziz Nesin.

== Life ==
Janina was born in Istanbul in 1890, son of Azmi bej Janina and Lalinur Vrioni. His father was from the Janina Albanian family and was a historian, as well as a local politician in different counties of the Ottoman Empire, whereas the mother hailed from the Vrioni family from Berat. Janina studied literature and history in Istanbul.

In 1954 he was sent to a labor camp in Kuç, Vlore by the communist regime, along other intellectuals. In 1960 he was given a translator job at the Institute of History of the Academy of Sciences of Albania in Tirana, where he translated, among other documents, the 1954 publication of Halil İnalcık's Register of the Sanjak of Albania, a demographic census that was completed by the Ottomans during 1431–1432. During his time at the Institute of History Janina was also able to mentor young Albanian osmanologists, such as Selami Pulaha, Kristaq Prifti, Gazmend Shpuza, Petrika Thëngjilli and Ferid Duka. He also became a lecturer of Osman Turkish at the University of Tirana.
