= Pavlo Kurtik =

Pavlo Kurtik Pal Kurti (Albanian)
- Occupation: Feudal lord
- Known for: Lord of Pavlo-Kurtik vilayet of the Ottoman Empire, one of few pre-Ottoman, Christian feudal lords.
- Title: senyör (seigneur)
- Military career
- Allegiance: Ottoman Empire
- Service years: ca. 1400–1432

Pavlo Kurtik (fl. 1431–1432, Albanian: Pal Kurti) was an Albanian or styled Slavo-Albanian feudal lord who held an Ottoman vilayet, an administrative unit in the Ottoman Empire similar to a county or shire, located between the Erzen and Shkumbin rivers in present-day Albania. While he was Christian, one of a few Christian lords in the Ottoman Empire, his sons converted in Islam and held various official titles throughout the Empire.

== History ==
In the 14th century, after the defeat of the Serbian Empire by the Ottomans, the Western Balkans became a collection of independent feudal states. After the Battle of Savra (1385) the Ottoman Empire absorbed the area of what is now the State of Albania. As an official in the Ottoman Empire Pavlo Kurtik is first mentioned in the first Ottoman defter (the official record of the Empire) of the Sanjak of Albania, dated 1431–1432. He entered Ottoman service shortly after 1400, and was one of few pre-Ottoman, Christian feudal lords along with his brother Karl Kurti(k). He governed over the vilayet of the same name (the Pavlo Kurtik vilayet) one of 9 vilayets of the Arvanit-ili province until 1466. In the 1431–1432 defter, Pavlo Kurtik held a timar of 26 villages subordinate to his son, Isa. The terms tahvil and vilayet-i Pavlo Kurtik shows that Pavlo Kurtik held the region before the Ottoman administration. His sons converted into Islam and became subaşi, a royal or administrative title in the Ottoman Empire similar to lord or sheriff, of various Ottoman subdivisions throughout Ottoman Albania.

== Family ==
The Kurti family was originally Christian, but it was Islamized in the second generation. Albanian historian Dhimitër Shuteriqi argued that the family originated from Krraba, and further theorised a connection to an 11th century nobleman named Vasil Kurtikios who had supported Alexios I Komnenos against the dux of Dyrrhachium.

Kurtik had the following descendants:

Unknown Wife	Pavlo Kurtik
Isa Beg Kurtik, Ottoman subaşi of Pavlo-Kurtik vilayet, converted into Islam.	Unknown Wife	Mustafa Kurtik, Ottoman subaşi of Berat vilayet, converted into Islam.	Unknown Wife
Ibrahim	Yusuf	Huseyin

== Annotations ==
1. Name: His given name is rendered Pavlo or Pavle (Albanian: Pal), his surname as Kurtik or Kurtić (Albanian: Kurti). His name in Albanian is Pal Kurti and it was common in that area and time to style names in the Slavic form "ic". His name in Serbian is Pavle Kurtić (Serbian Cyrillic: Павле Куртић).

== Bibliography ==
Notes

References

- Hrabak, Bogumil (1990). Širenje arbanaških stočara po ravnicama i slovenski ratari srednjovekovne Albanije (in Serbian). Cetinje: Zbornik radova sa međunarodnog naučnog skupa. (Serbian Latin version)
- Škrivanić, Gavro A. (1959). Imenik geografskikh naziva srednjovekovne Zete (in Serbo-Croatian). Podgorica.
- Kiel, Machiel (1990). Ottoman architecture in Albania, 1385–1912. Research Centre for Islamic History, Art and Culture. ISBN 9789290633303.
- İnalcık, Halil (1995). From empire to republic: essays on Ottoman and Turkish social history. Isis Press. ISBN 9789754280807.
- İnalcık, Halil (2005). Doğu Batı: makaleler, Volume 2 (in Turkish). Doğubatı. ISBN 9789758717422.
- İnalcık, Halil (Halil Inaldžik) (1953). Od Stefana Dušana do Osmanskog Carstva (PDF) (in Serbo-Croatian). Sarajevo: Štamparski Zavod "Veselin Masleša".
