= Pavlo-Kurtik =

Sanjak of Albania with Pavlo-Kurtik Vilayet

Pavlo-Kurtik (Turkish: vilayet-i Pavlo Kurtik) was an administrative unit within the sanjak of Albania, Ottoman Empire, which had jurisdiction to the south of Tirana, between the Erzen and Shkumbin rivers. It was one of 9 vilayets of the Arvanit-ili province until 1466. Pavlo-Kurtik was first mentioned in the first defter of the Sanjak of Albania (1431–1432).

== Geography ==
Pavlo-Kurtik had jurisdiction to the south of Tirana, between the Erzen and Shkumbin rivers.

== History ==
Pavlo Kurtik or Pal Kurti, stylized as Slavo-Albanian, entered Ottoman service shortly after 1400, and was one of few pre-Ottoman Christian feudal lords. The Kurtik family was originally Christian, but it was Islamized in the second generation.

== Demographics and administration ==
1431–1432 defter, researched by İnalcık, Halil

The vilayet of Pavlo-Kurtik had a majority of Christian spahi; it had 20 timars, of which 9 belonged to Christians. Of the Muslim timars, one is assigned to the kadı of Jenidže-kale (Bratušeš), and one to the dizdar. Five of them are assigned to the bey-kulu's (slaves of the emir), one to the spahi-oglan, one to the brother Ajas-Hamza beg, and one to Alija Karli-oglu. The timar of Isa, Pavlo Kurtik's son, is special. All the nine timars had no Islamic population for one or two decades. Two of the timariots were sons to great lords: Isa, son of Pavle Kurtik, and Ali, son of Karlo, who converted into Islam.

The timar of Isa Beg includes 107 villages with 1,225 households (families), with an income of 81,306 akçe. Thirty-six of these were of the vilayet of Balša, 2 of the vilayet of Kondo Miho, 18 of the land of Gonomajmo (Gonoma), and 26 were tahvil (assigned) to his father, Pavlo Kurtik; that is, Pavlo Kurtik personally held these 26 villages. The expression tahvil indicated an assignment of a current timar, but the term "vilayet-i Pavlo Kurtik" shows that Pavlo Kurtik was the holder of this region even earlier. The position of Isa Beg, Kurtik's son, who converted to Islam and was appointed subaşi of this province, was much greater. Another son, Mustafa, held a timar of 9,142 akçe in the Berat Vilayet.

Isa Beg's timars were not inspected or collected personally by the local emin, but managed and issued by Isa Beg himself. This shows that Isa Beg had some privileges. Alija, Karlo's son, also has the same privileges in his timar.

Alija's great timar had 30 villages, with an income of about 30,000 akçe. The timar was later given to Karlo's sons who remained Christian. Another son of Karlo, Muzak, held a little timar in Pavlo-Kurtik during the reign of Mehmed I. Hamza veled-i Karli, who was later a lord of a timar in Altun-ili (Ibalea), was most likely a son of Muzak.

One of the Christian spahi who held larger timars in Pavlo-Kurtik was Dimitri from Prespa, with 9,031 akçe. Dimitri took personal consent and gave his timar to his brother-in-law/son-in-law Ozgur (Sguras). In the defter of the sanjak of Avlona, Murad-beg, the son of Ozgur, holds a great timar in the same region, with 64,729 akçe.
