= Evrenosoğlu Ali Bey =

Ottoman military commander

- Evrenosoğlu Ali Bey
- Born: Bursa, Ottoman Empire
- Burial place: Courtyard of the Gazi Evrenos mosque in Yenitsá (Giannitsa in Greece)
- Military career
- Allegiance: Ottoman Empire
- Rank: Sanjak-bey
- Conflicts: Albanian Revolt of 1432–1436; Battle of Mediaş (1438); Siege of Belgrade (1440); Fall of Constantinople (1453); Siege of Belgrade (1456); Siege of Trebizond (1461); Battle of Buzău

Evrenosoğlu Ali Bey, known simply as Ali Bey, was an Ottoman military commander in the 15th century. He was one of the sons of Evrenos, an Ottoman general. During the 1430s he was sanjak-bey of the Sanjak of Albania who, after initial defeats, suppressed the Albanian Revolt of 1432–1436 with help of the forces commanded by Turahan Bey. In 1440 he participated in the unsuccessful Ottoman Siege of Belgrade.

== Origin ==
Ali Bey was a son of Ottoman commander Evrenos Bey. Οriginally, Evrenos Βey was a noble dignitary, a bey in the principality of Karasi, joining the Ottomans only after their conquest of the beylik in 1345. A Greek legend maintains that Evrenos' father was a certain Ornos, renegade Byzantine governor of Bursa (Prusa) who defected to the Ottomans, and then on to Karasi, after the Siege of Bursa, in 1326. The Evrenos family were certainly of non-Turkish origin. Stanford J. Shaw confirms this, stating that Evrenos was originally a Byzantine feudal prince in Anatolia who had entered Ottoman service following the capture of Bursa, converted to Islam, and later became a leading military commander under both Orhan and Murat. Joseph von Hammer regarded Evrenos as simply a Byzantine Greek convert to Islam.

== Albania ==
Ali Bey was sanjakbey of the Sanjak of Albania before 1432. When Ishak Bey captured Dagnum from Koja Zaharia in 1430 it was attached to the territory controlled by Ali Bey.

In the early phase of the Albanian Revolt, in the winter of 1432, Sultan Murat II gathered around 10.000 troops under Ali Bey, who marched along the Via Egnatia and reached the central valley of Shkumbin, where he was ambushed and defeated by forces under Gjergj Arianiti. In 1435-6 he followed Turahan Bey's campaign, which restored Ottoman rule in the region.

== Other campaigns ==
According to some legends Hunyadi was Evrenosoglu's groom. Hunyadi became intimate of the king of Hungary after he fled from Ali.

Evrenosoglu commanded an army which was sent to weaken Wallachia and Transylvania in 1438. In 1440 Ali Beg participated in the unsuccessful siege of Belgrade where he built a wall around the city and used it to hurl stones. According to Konstantin Mihailović, the title of bey and corresponding estate was promised to the Ottoman soldier who would wave Ottoman flag on the Belgrade walls. Although Evrenosoglu already had the title of bey at that time he decided to personally lead the assault to the walls of the Belgrade castle hoping to increase his already great reputation. When Murad II died in 1451, Ali Bey was dispatched by Mehmed II to execute Murad's son, Şehzade Küçük Ahmed.

Evrenosoglu was buried in the courtyard of the Gazi Evrenos mosque in Yenidje (modern Giannitsa in Greece).

== Sources ==
- Babinger, Franz (1992) [1978]. Mehmed the Conqueror and His Time. Bollingen Series 96. Translated from the German by Ralph Manheim. Edited, with a preface, by William C. Hickman. Princeton, New Jersey: Princeton University Press. ISBN 0-691-09900-6.
- Jefferson, John (17 August 2012). The Holy Wars of King Wladislas and Sultan Murad: The Ottoman-Christian Conflict from 1438-1444. BRILL. pp. 163, 244. ISBN 978-90-04-22925-9.

Preceded by ?	sanjak-bey of Albania; 1432–37	Succeeded by Yakup Bey
