= Siege of Belgrade (1440) =

1440 siege of the city of Belgrade by the Ottoman Empire

- Part of the Hungarian–Ottoman Wars and the Serbian–Ottoman wars
Date	end of April 1440 – October 1440
Location	Belgrade, Kingdom of Hungary
Result	Hungarian and Serbian victory

Belligerents
Ottoman Empire	Kingdom of Hungary; Serbian Despotate

Commanders and leaders
(Ottoman Empire) Murad II (Ottoman Empire) Ali Bey	Ivan Talovac

Strength
35,000; 100 ships	3,000–5,000

Casualties and losses
17,000 (early Christian sources); Extremely heavy casualties	Unknown

The siege of Belgrade was a long siege by the forces of the Ottoman Empire, lasted about six or seven months in 1440. Belgrade was an important fortified town of the Serbian Despotate and the key fortress of the Hungarian defense line after the Ottoman subjugation of Serbia in 1439. The siege ended with a dramatic final assault, the Ottomans were repelled, and after the failed assault the Turks gave up the siege and returned home.

== Background ==
The struggle over the throne of Hungary and Slavonia resulted in a civil war that provided the Ottomans with an opportunity for advancement. Seizing upon this opportunity, Sultan Murad II decided to capture Belgrade.

== Forces ==
The Belgrade castle was protected by the canons which were placed there during the period of Serbian Despot Stefan Lazarević. The Ottoman Army, commanded by Sultan Murad II and Ali Beg Evrenosoglu, built a wall around the city and used it to hurl stones at its fortifications. They also used cannons cast in Smederevo, the Despotate capital they had captured a year before.

The strength of the Belgrade garrison is unknown. Besides Talovac's banderij of around 500 men from Croatia, the garrison was enforced with Czech and Italian mercenary archers. The local Serb population also assisted defenders Talovac's forces had significant advantage because some of them used rifles, which was the first usage of the rifles against the Ottomans.

== Battle ==
Murad II approached Belgrade with his forces at the end of April 1440. Taloci was not immediately aware of the size of the Ottoman forces. He had initially intended to defeat them on the open battlefield, but when he realized his forces were heavily outnumbered, Taloci retreated to the city. Murad II ordered building of mobile towers and cannons of different sizes, fortified his position and besieged the city.

According to Konstantin Mihailović, the title of bey and a corresponding estate was promised to the Ottoman soldier who waved the Ottoman flag on the Belgrade walls. Although Evrenosoğlu already had the title of bey at that time, he decided to personally lead the assault on the walls of the Belgrade castle, in hopes of increasing his already great reputation.

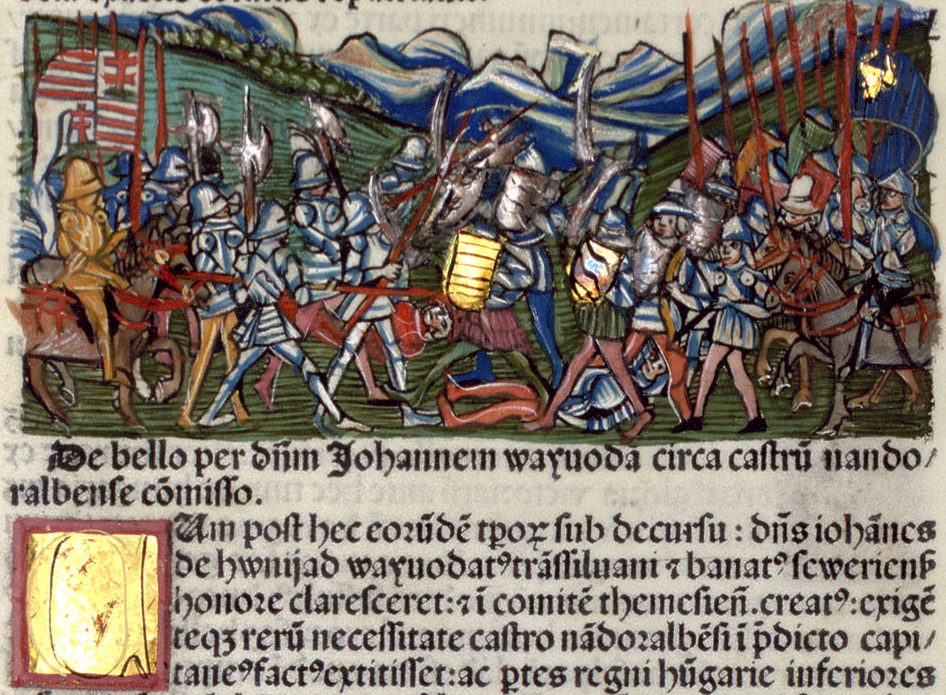
The battle of John Hunyadi in 1441 against the Ottomans who attacked Belgrade again after the Siege of Belgrade in 1440 (Chronica Hungarorum, 1488)

And when the enemy tunnel had reached within the walls of the fortress, up to the tunnel excavated by the fortress’s inhabitants, and the noise of those digging it was heard by the guards, at once fire was brought to set alight all the explosives that had been arranged. And its fierce flames and the smoke were the cause of the sudden death of every living thing, man and beast, inside the tunnel. When the sultan himself saw that this device would not help him capture the fortress, he returned home in confusion, having lost, or so it is said, 17,000 of his people, and having devoted seven months to the siege.

— Johannes Thuróczy: Chronica Hungarorum

== Sources ==
- Jefferson, John (2012). The Holy Wars of King Wladislas and Sultan Murad: The Ottoman-Christian Conflict from 1438–1444. Leiden: Brill Publishers. ISBN 978-90-04-21904-5.
