= Sanjak of Albania =

Ottoman administrative unit in the 15th century

Sanjak of Albania Sanxhaku i Arbërisë (Albanian)
- Sanjak of the Ottoman Empire
- 1415–1444
- Flag Coat of arms

- Capital: Gjirokastër (since 1419); Vlorë (since 1431)
- History
  - Established: 1415
  - Disestablished: 1444
Preceded by	Succeeded by
John Zenevisi; Lordship of Zeta	League of Lezhë
- Today part of: Albania; Greece

The Sanjak of Albania (Ottoman Turkish: سنجاق آرونید, romanized: Sancâk-ı Arvanid, or آرونید سنجاغی, Arvanid sancâğı; Albanian: Sanxhaku i Arbërisë or Sanxhaku i Shqipërisë) was a second-level administrative unit of the Ottoman Empire between 1415 and 1444. Its mandate included territories of modern central and southern Albania between Krujë to the Kalamas River in northwestern Greece.

== Background ==
During the 14th century, Ottoman rule began to extend over the Eastern Mediterranean and the Balkans. The divided nature of the Albania consisting of small, quarreling fiefdoms ruled by independent feudal lords and tribal chiefs meant that an Ottoman invasion was difficult to defend against. In 1385, the ruler of Durrës, Karl Thopia, appealed to the sultan for support against his rivals, the Balšić family. An Ottoman force quickly marched into Albania along the Via Egnatia and routed Balša II in the Battle of Savra. The principal Albanian clans soon swore fealty to the Ottoman Empire. The Ottomans allowed conquered Albanian clan chiefs to maintain their positions and property, but they had to pay tribute, send their sons to the Ottoman court as hostages, and provide the Ottoman army with auxiliary troops.

== History ==
The sanjak was established by 1415–17. After 1431, the capital of the sanjak seems to have been Vlorë.

In the 1431–32 period all rural and urban households and their property were registered in all ten districts of the Arvanid sanjak. The 1432 register shows that districts in the Sanjak of Albania were further divided on 335 timars, each composed by two or three villages. The Arvanid register is one of the earliest available land registers in Ottoman Empire's archives, and was published in 1954.

In 1432 Andrew Thopia and Gjergj Arianiti revolted against the empire. When the Albanian Revolt of 1432–36 began the sanjakbey of Albania was Ali Bey Evrenosoglu. The uprising was finally suppressed during the 1435–36 campaigns of Ali Bey and Turakhan Beg.

In 1437, when Teodor III Muzaka revolted against the Ottomans, the sanjak-bey of Albania was his son Yakup Bey. In 1437–38 Skanderbeg was appointed the subaşi of Krujë, after which Hizir Bey was again appointed to that position in November 1438. The first position of Hadim Sehabeddin Pasha outside the sultan's palace was the position of sanjakbey of the Sanjak of Albania, which he held until 1439 when he was appointed as beylerbey of the Rumelia Eyalet. When in 1441 Përmet was annexed to the sanjak of Albania, Yakup Bey is mentioned as its sanjakbey. He remained on the position of the sanjakbey of the Sanjak of Albania until September 1442 when he was killed as one of 16 Ottoman sanjakbeys under command of Hadim Sehabeddin Pasha who were all killed by Christian forces commanded by Janos Hunyadi in a battle near Ialomița River.

Hadim Suleiman Pasha was the sanjak-bey of Albania briefly before becoming the sanjak-bey of Smederevo.

The Sanjak of Albania was disestablished in 1444, after the League of Lezhë was formed. After Elbasan fell into Ottoman hands once again the construction of Elbasan Castle saw the establishment of the Sanjak of Elbasan. The new sanjak incorporated Isbat (Shpat) and Çermenika. At the same time the Sanjak of Avlona (Vlorë) was established with the sub-districts (kaza) of Skrapar, Përmet, Pogon, Tepelenë and Gjirokastër.

== Administration ==
The newly occupied Albanian lands were organized into the sancak-i Arvanid ("sanjak of the Arvanids"), a military-administrative district subject to the larger Rumelia Eyalet (Ottoman Balkans). The sanjak was subdivided into nine vilayets, sub-districts including a city and its surrounding villages, headed by beys. The vilayets in turn were subdivided into nahiyes under the supervision of a naib (district-judge). The Sanjak of Albania represents the first definition of Albania by the Ottoman Empire as a territorial unit, linking the Albanian language to a specific territory.

In 1431–32 the Ottoman governor Umur Bey compiled a defter (cadastral survey) in the sanjak, which stretched from Krujë in the north to the Kalamas river valley in the south.

1431–32 defter
Vilâyet	Seat	Notes
Ergirikasrı or Zenebis	Ergirikasrı (Gjirokastër)	
Klisura	Klisura (Këlcyrë)	
Kanina	Kanina (Kaninë)	
Belgrad	Belgrad (Berat)	
Tomorince	Tomorince (Tomorricë)	
İskrapar	İskrapar (Skrapar)	
Pavlo-Kurtik		20 timars (9 Christian).
Çartolos		
Akçahisar	Akçahisar (Krujë)	

=== Governors ===
- Ali Bey Evrenosoglu (c. 1432–37)
- Yakup Bey (1437–38)
- Hadım Şehabeddin (1438–39)
- Yakup Bey (fl. 1441–September 1442)
- Hadım Suleiman Pasha (?)

== Sources ==
- Altuğ, Uğur (2010). "Arvanid-İli'nde Hıristiyan Sipahiler". II. Murad Dönemine ait Tahrir Defterlerinin yayına hazırlanması ve bu malzemeye göre tımar sistemi, demografi, yerleşme ve topoğrafya üzerinde araştırmalar (in Turkish). Ankara.
- Anamali, Skënder (2002). Historia e popullit shqiptar në katër vëllime (in Albanian). Vol. I. Botimet Toena. OCLC 52411919.
- İnalcık, Halil (1954). Hicrî 835 tarihli Sûret-i defter-i sancak-i Arvanid (in Turkish). Ankara: Türk Tarih Kurumu Basımevi. OCLC 16745883.
- İnalcık, Halil (1995). From empire to republic: essays on Ottoman and Turkish social history. Isis Press. ISBN 978-975-428-080-7.
- Nicol, Donald M. (1984). The Despotate of Epiros 1267-1479: A Contribution to the History of Greece in the Middle Ages. Cambridge University Press. p. 204. ISBN 978-0-521-26190-6.
- Giakoumis, K. (2004). "The Ottoman Advance and Consolidation in Epiros and Albania During the Fourteenth and Fifteenth Centuries". Ηπειρωτικό Ημερολόγιο. 23: 217–244.
- Editorial Committee of the International Union of Academies (1960). THE ENCYCLOPAEDIA OF ISLAM: A–B. Vol. 1. London: E.J.Brill. pp. 654–655.
