= Evrenos =

Ottoman military commander (died 1417)

Gazi Haci Evrenos Bey
- Nickname: Gazi Baba
- Born: unknown
- Died: 1417 Yenice-i Vardar, Ottoman Empire (now Giannitsa, Greece)
- Buried: Mausoleum of Ghazi Evrenos, Giannitsa
- Allegiance: Ottoman Empire
- Conflicts: Battle of Kosovo (1389); Battle of Nicopolis (1396); Battle of Maritsa; Conquest of Keşan, İpsala, Komotini, Feres, Xanthi, Maroneia, Serres, Monastir, and, in 1397, Corinth
- Children: Ali Bey Evrenosoğlu; Evrenosoğlu İsa Bey; Hızırşah Bey; Yakub Bey; Beğce Bey; Süleyman Bey; Barak Bey

Evrenos or Evrenuz (Note: Byzantine sources mention him as Ἐβρενός, Ἀβρανέζης, Βρανέζης, Βρανεύς (?), Βρενέζ, Βρενέζης, Βρενές.) (died 1417, Yenice-i Vardar) was an Ottoman military commander and frontier lord active during the expansion of Ottoman power into the Balkans in the second half of the 14th century.

He served as a general under Süleyman Pasha, Murad I, Bayezid I, Süleyman Çelebi and Mehmed I, and played a central role in the Ottoman conquest and consolidation of large parts of Macedonia, Thrace, and central Greece.

== Birth and early life ==
The exact date and place of Evrenos Bey's birth are not recorded in contemporaneous Ottoman or Byzantine sources. No surviving chronicle, archival document, or inscription provides a definitive year of birth. As a result, modern scholarship treats his birth date as unknown.

Some later narratives and modern secondary accounts have suggested that Evrenos was born in 1288 and lived for more than a century. However, such claims are not supported by primary historical documentation and are generally regarded as legendary. According to modern historians, these accounts likely arose from the conflation of Evrenos Bey's own career with the military activities and offices held by his descendants, several of whom remained influential in the Balkans well into the 15th century.

== Career ==
Evrenos first appears in historical records as an Ottoman military commander operating in the Balkans during the mid-14th century. He participated in and led campaigns during the reigns of multiple Ottoman rulers, a fact that has contributed to later exaggerations of his lifespan.

He took part in major Ottoman victories, including the Battle of Kosovo (1389) and the Battle of Nicopolis (1396), and is credited with the conquest or incorporation of numerous towns and regions, including Keşan, İpsala, Komotini, Feres, Xanthi, Maroneia, Serres, Monastir, and Corinth in 1397. His activities were instrumental in establishing long-term Ottoman control over much of the southern Balkans.

== Identity and origin ==
Evrenos is also known in some sources by the name Gavrinos. Several historians have suggested that he may have been of Greek origin or descended from a Byzantine family that entered Ottoman service during the period of frontier expansion.

Byzantine sources preserve multiple variant forms of his name, reflecting both linguistic adaptation and the difficulty of identifying frontier figures across cultural and political boundaries.

== Death ==
Evrenos Bey died in 1417 in Yenice-i Vardar. His burial site, the Mausoleum of Ghazi Evrenos in present-day Giannitsa, remains extant and serves as one of the principal material attestations of his historical existence.

== Legacy ==
Evrenos founded a powerful family whose members, known as the Evrenosoğulları, continued to hold military and administrative positions in the Balkans for generations. The longevity of his family's prominence contributed significantly to later legendary portrayals of Evrenos himself as a figure of extraordinary lifespan and uninterrupted service.

== Biography ==
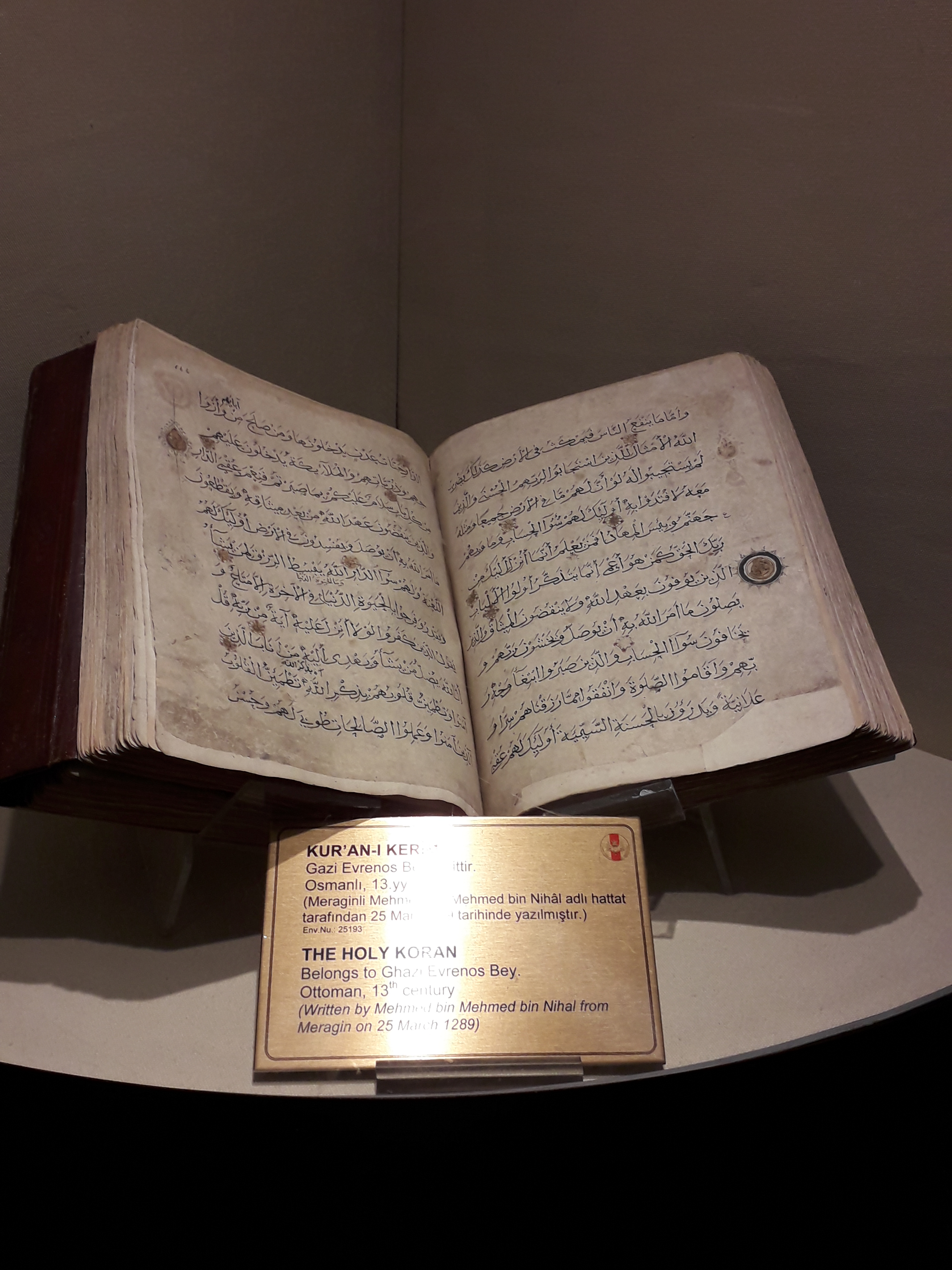
A copy of the Koran that belonged to Evrenos

Οriginally, Gazi Evrenos was a noble dignitary, a bey in the principality of Karasi, joining the Ottomans only after their conquest of the beylik in 1345. A Greek legend maintains that Evrenos' father was a certain Ornos, renegade Byzantine governor of Bursa (Prusa) who defected to the Ottomans, and then on to Karasi, after the Siege of Bursa, in 1326. Stanford J. Shaw states that Evrenos was originally a Byzantine Greek feudal prince in Anatolia who had entered Ottoman service following the capture of Bursa, converted to Islam, and later became a leading military commander under both Orhan and Murat. Joseph von Hammer regarded Evrenos as simply a Byzantine Greek convert to Islam. Peter Sugar considers the family to be of Greek origin as well. Turkish sources report that the family was of Turkish origin. However, others dismiss this, noting that the Evrenos family were certainly of non-Turkish origin.

Evrenos led important campaigns and battles in Bulgaria, Thessaly, and Serbia; after his participation in the 1362 Ottoman conquest of Adrianopolis, Evrenos was appointed uc beği (frontier warlord) of Thessaly. Evrenos built a hospice in Komotini following his conquest of the area in 1363. Later, Evrenos also led the conquest of Serres.

The most famous battle Evrenos participated in was the shattering victory of the battle of Maritsa, where a small Ottoman force launched a devastating night raid and routed over 50,000 Serbian Empire soldiers. Later, Evrenos and his Akinjis fought in the Battle of Kosovo (1389) and the Battle of Nicopolis (1396). Evrenos conquered Keşan, İpsala, Komotini, Feres, Xanthi, Maroneia, Monastir, and in 1397, Corinth. He founded the town Yenice-i Vardar, modern Giannitsa.

Gazi Evrenos died at an advanced age in Yenice-i Vardar. He was buried in a mausoleum there in 1417. The mausoleum survives but was badly damaged in the 19th century and served for a time as an agricultural store.

== Legacy ==
As one of the most successful Ottoman commanders, Evrenos acquired considerable wealth and founded numerous endowments (awqaf). Several monuments attributed to him survive in southeastern Europe. Of primary importance is his türbe (mausoleum) with its accompanying epitaph in Giannitsa. A hammam of Evrenos stands to the south of the mausoleum. Two other monuments stand in Greek Thrace.

Mausoleum pre-restoration

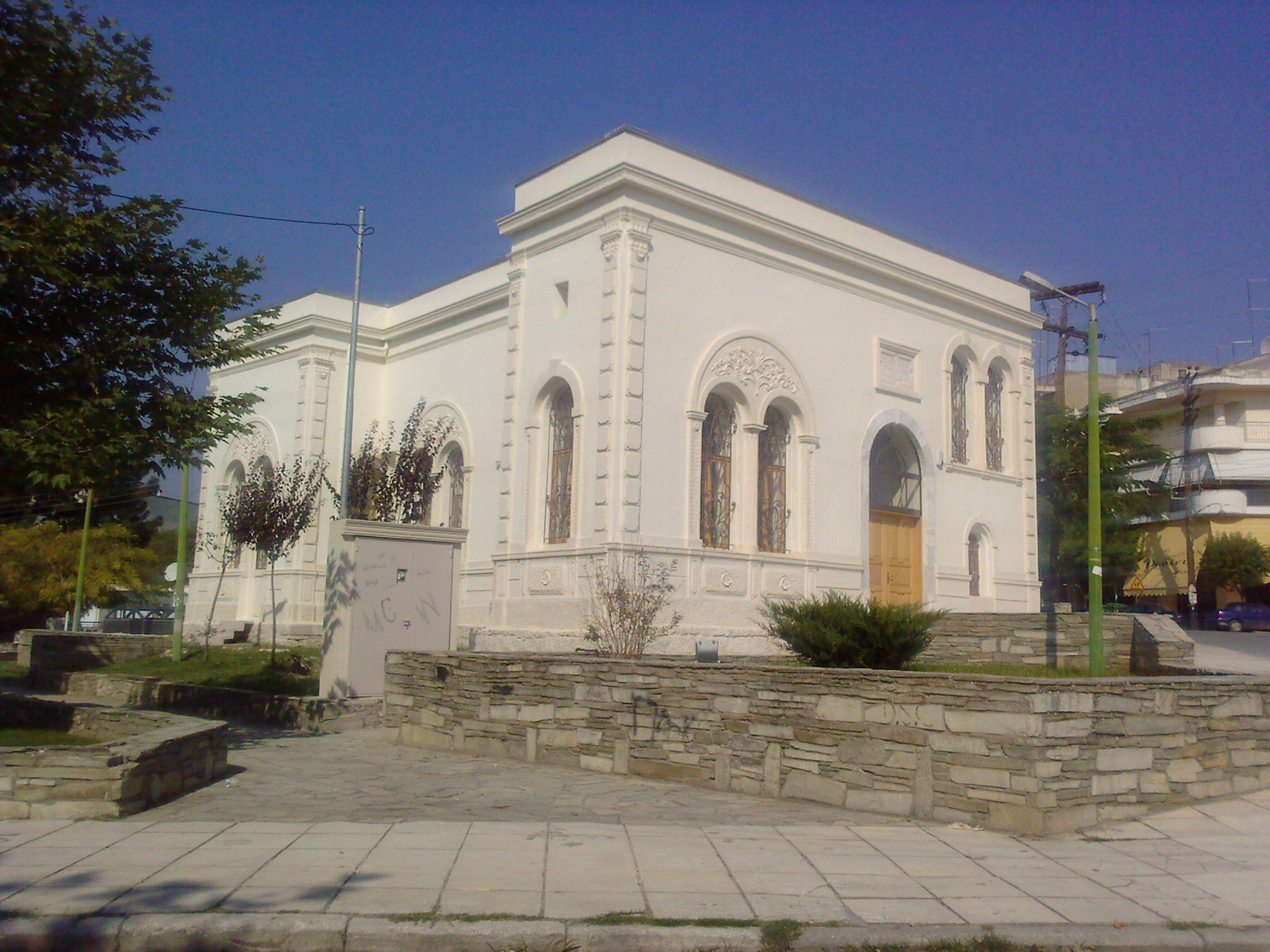
Mausoleum post-restoration

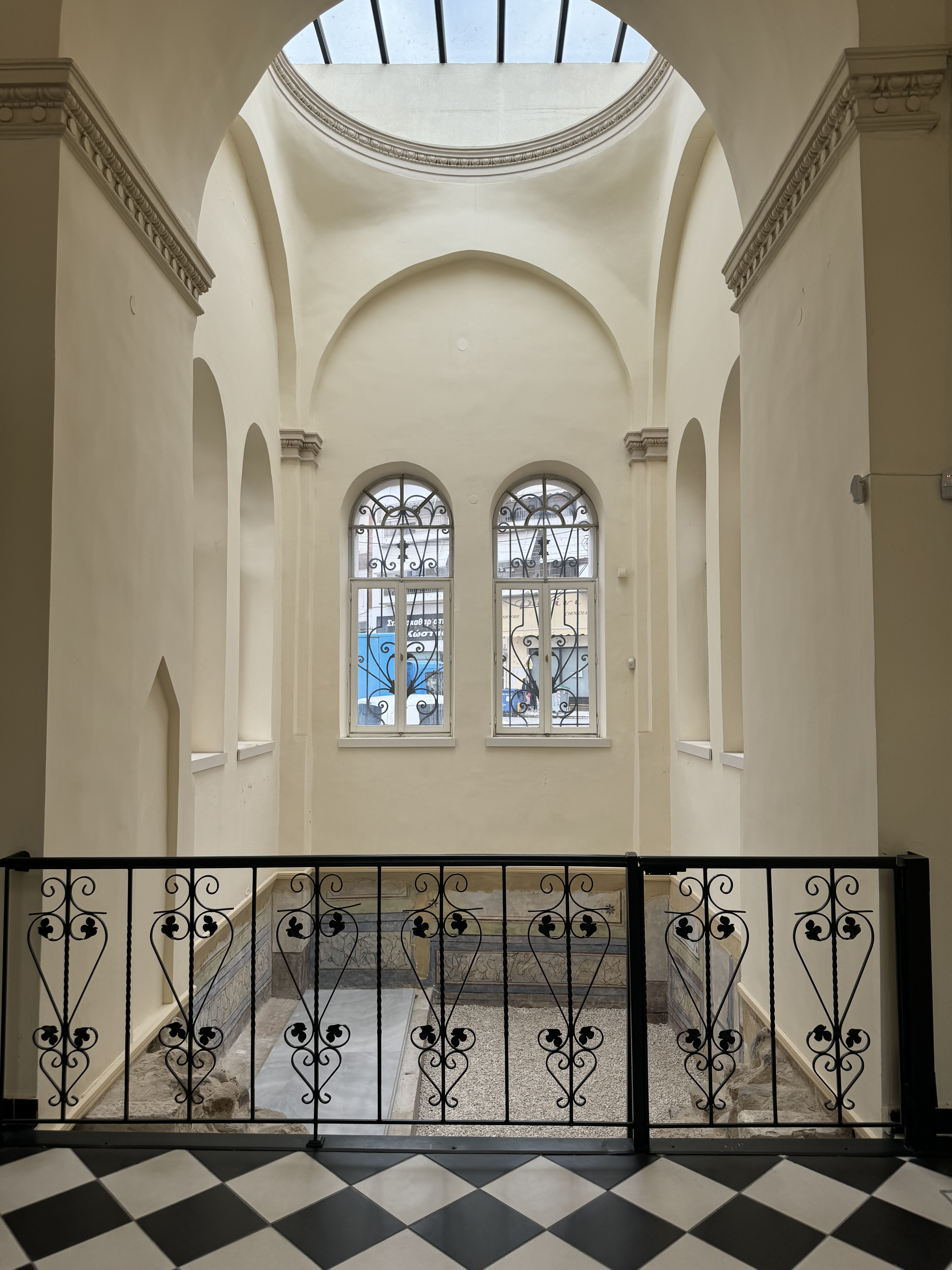
Burial area

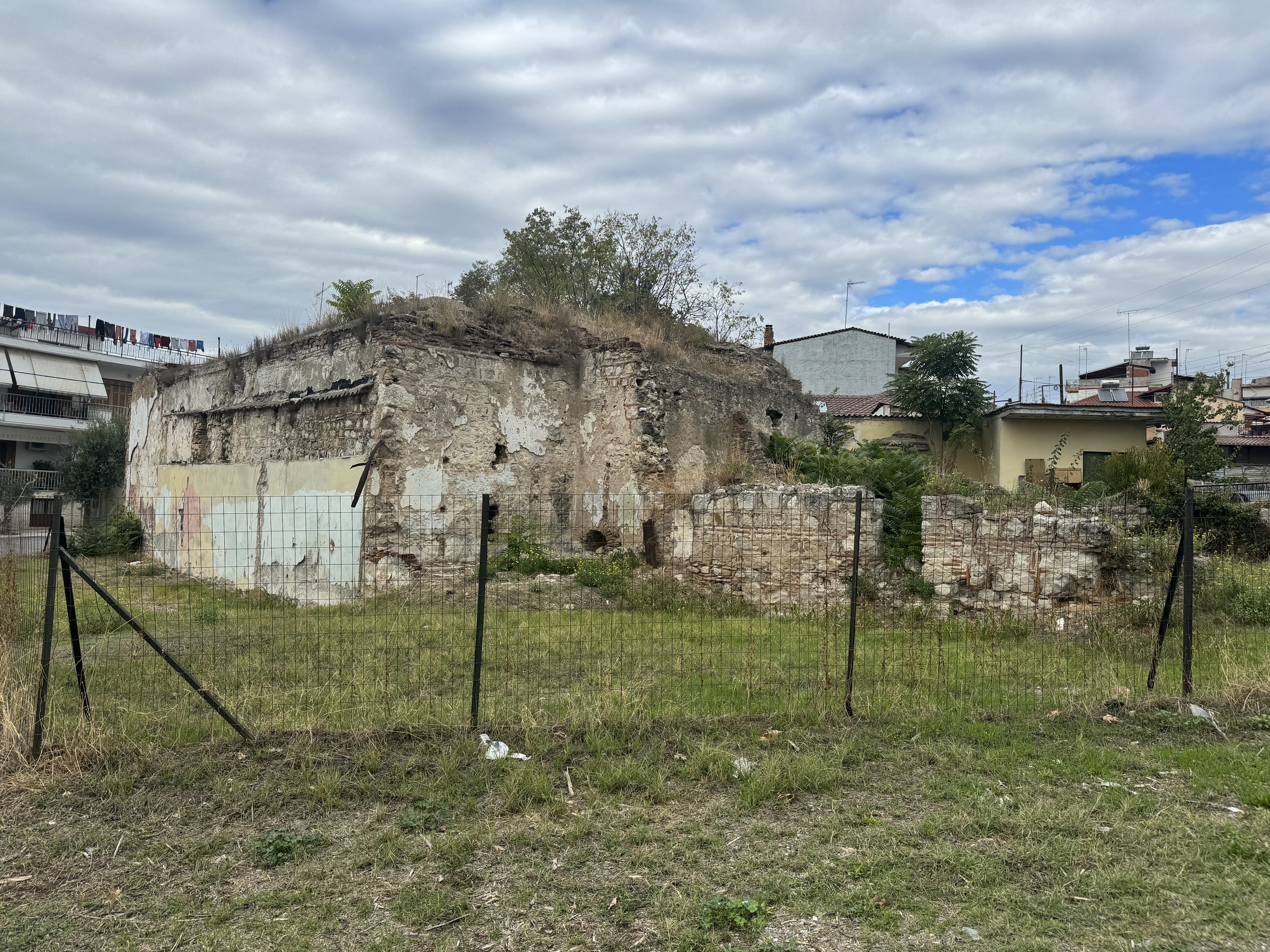
Hammam of Evrenos

== Heritage and descendants ==
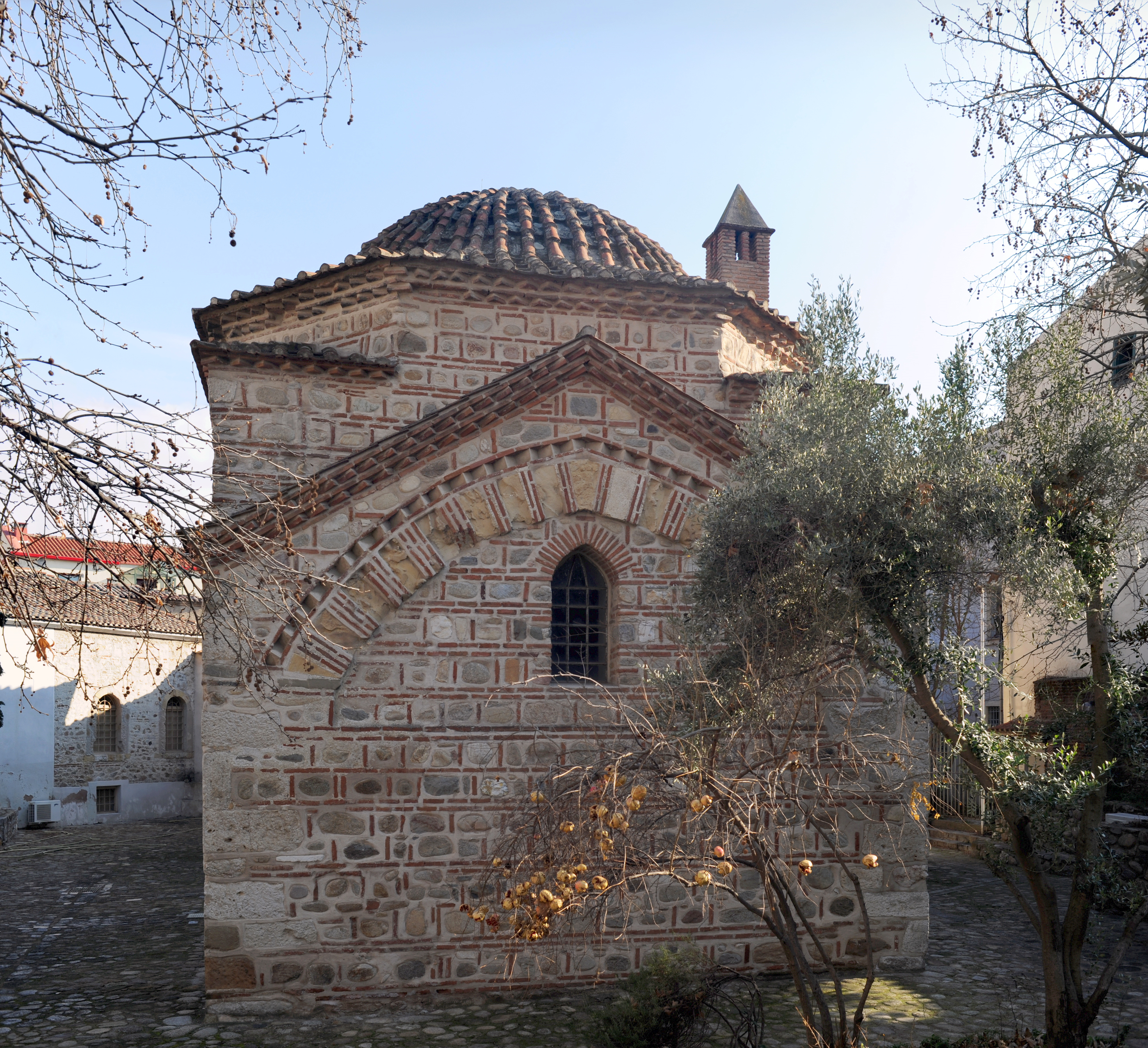
Imaret of Komotini, Thrace, Greece

Some argue that the name Evrenos (also Evrenuz) is not Turkish. Heath Lowry theorized that the father of Hayreddin Barbarossa perhaps was a Sipahi cavalry served under Evrenos. What is certain is that Gazi Evrenos was from Ottoman Anatolia and first appears as bey. Lapavitsas even put forward that the founder, Piranki (Prangı) Isa Bey, might've been descended from the mercenaries of the Catalan Company, who razed the coasts of Asia Minor in the early 14th century. But modern historians generally reject these views. In light of a newly discovered vâkfiye (pious endowment charter) drawn up in 1456–1457 by İsa Beğ (one of Evrenos' seven sons), it posits a new explanation for the ethnic origins of the family. In this regard it advances the hypothesis that to his contemporaries 'Evrenos' was actually known as 'Evreniz/Evrenüz' or 'Avraniz/Avranüz.' Further, according to Heath W. Lowry, that his father's actual name was Branko/Pranko Lazart, which, according to Lowry, raises the possibility of a Serbian origin for the family. Others, such as Stanford J. Shaw, Dimitri Kitsikis, Peter Sugar, and Joseph Von Hammer propose a Greek origin for the family, with Shaw noting that he was a Byzantine feudal prince in Anatolia who converted to Islam and entered Ottoman service following the capture of Bursa.

Îsâ "Prangi" Bey, Evrenos' father, was, according to some sources, the son of Bozoklu Han, who joined Süleyman Pasha in his conquest of Rumelia. He is said to have been martyred in the village of Prangi (also known as Sırcık or Kırcık in Ottoman sources), a busy ferry-place on the Evros river about 6 km (4 mi) east from Didymoteicho, and that his tomb was built by his son Evrenos (Evrenuz) Bey.

Gazi Evrenos Bey was father of seven sons (Khidr-shah, Isa, Suleyman, Ali, Yakub, Barak, Begdje) and several daughters one of whom married the Grand Vizier Çandarlı Halil Pasha and became the mother of Bayezid II’s Grand Vizier, Çandarlı İbrahim Pasha

Together with the Mihaloğulları (from the Ottoman Beylik ), Malkoçoğulları (from Serbia), Ömerli/Ömeroğlu, and the Turahanoğulları, Evrenos' descendants, the Evrenosoğulları, constitute one of the Byzantine families that effectively formed the early Ottoman warrior nobility.

== See also ==
- Lala Shahin Pasha
- Çandarlı Kara Halil Hayreddin Pasha
- Umur the Lion
