= Benigna Magyar =

- Seal of Benigna Magyar, 1519
- Born: c. 1465
- Died: after 1525
- Noble family: House of Magyar
- Spouses: 1, Pál Kinizsi (m. c. 1480; died 1494); 2, Marko Mišljenović (m. 1495; died 1508) 3, Gregory Kereki (m. 1509; died 1519)
- Father: Blaise Magyar
- Mother: Barbara N

Benigna Magyar (died after 1525) was a Hungarian noblewoman in the 15th–16th centuries. She was the wife of the famous military general Pál Kinizsi, making her one of the wealthiest noblewomen in Hungary at the time. The suspicious death of her third husband led to the gradual loss of her fortune. Two of her prayer books have survived for posterity.

== Early life ==
Benigna was born around 1465, as the daughter of the skilled military general Blaise Magyar, who rose from the ranks of the lesser nobility to become one of the most powerful barons during the reign of Matthias Corvinus. Her mother was a certain Barbara, but it is conceivable that Benigna was born from a later, perhaps second, marriage of her father. It is possible she was born in Senj, Croatia, because the Robinja, a play of Hanibal Lucić preserved her name. Her father, Blaise Magyar served as Ban of Croatia and Dalmatia during that time. Benigna had a brother Ladislaus and three sisters, Barbara, Margaret and Martha. They were the wives of Teophil Thurzó, John Maloweczky and George Pető de Gerse, respectively.

The young Benigna was perhaps taught to read and write by nuns. Here she received a devout religious upbringing, but she also mastered the Latin language to a certain extent. She also could read Hungarian. In this respect, she stood above the average for the Hungarian nobility of that era in terms of her level of education.

== Marriages ==
=== First marriage ===
Around 1480, Benigna married Pál Kinizsi, who was a lieutenant and adopted son of her father. Her husband, who was born in 1432, was about thirty to forty years older than her. Kinizsi was one of the most skilled war-lords of the Black Army. As ispán of Temes County and Captain-General of the Lower Parts since 1479, he was responsible for the Hungarian defense against the Ottoman incursions. The arrangement of the marriage served the interests of both Benigna's father and Kinizsi, as it allowed the vast fortune to remain in a single pair of hands (by that time, Blaise's son, Ladislaus, had likely already died). They are first mentioned as spouses in a document issued in January 1482. At that time, they were in a legal dispute with the Polyai family concerning the estate Karakó in Vas County.

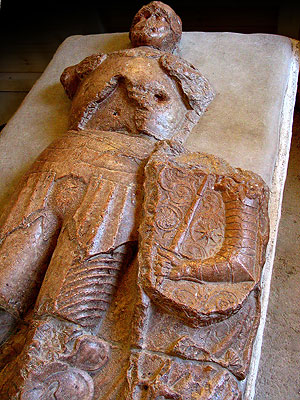
Tomb of Pál Kinizsi in Nagyvázsony

Under Kinizsi and Benigna, the family estate of Nagyvázsony became a Renaissance centre in Hungary. Benigna's suite was located on the third floor of the residential tower built there. Shortly after Maximilian's attack in 1490, Kinizsi had a barbican built. The finds unearthed in the castle (chess pieces, Italian-made fragment with a cherub head) reflect the rich artistic culture of the Nagyvázsony manor house, which also characterized the art-patronizing attitude of Benigna and her husband, as members of King Matthias' new aristocracy. The couple also provided significant donations (for instance, the aforementioned Karakó and its accessories) to the Pauline monks who settled there; in return, the monks gifted Benigna an ornate prayer book in 1492, later called as Festetics Codex (see below). By this year, Kinizsi was already in poor health (he suffered a brain hemorrhage that year), as indicated by a prayer in the book. As a result, Kinizsi compiled his last will and testament in September 1492, in which he named his wife as his heir; he bequeathed the castle of Nagyvázsony with its accessories, the oppidum Adony, the villages Abony, Paládics (now a borough of Abony), Tószeg, Bög (now a borough of Tiszakécske), Kékcse, Kürt, Sas, and half portions of Vezseny, Bököny, Kerekegyháza, Hímesegyháza and Nagyrév to Benigna. King Vladislaus II confirmed Kinizsi's will in January 1493. She was inducted into the ownership of these possessions in June 1493. This indicates that, even then, she had taken over the day-to-day management of the estates in place of her gravely ill husband.

The marriage of Kinizsi and Benigna remained childless. Since the noblewoman did not have any children from her two subsequent marriages either, it is possible that she was infertile. Local folk tradition preserved that Kinizsi was having affairs with local serf girls, having grown tired of Benigna's "haughty" nature. Pál Kinizsi became Judge royal in January 1494, which was the second most prestigious position in Hungary. However, the elderly and ailing military general died in late November of that year, with which the Kinizsi family died out. Benigna commissioned craftsmen to carve her husband's red-marble tomb (this was perhaps completed by the early 1500s). Kinizsi was buried under the altar of the Pauline monastery in Nagyvázsony. In a letter dated 10 December 1494, Stephen Zápolya mentioned Kinizsi's funeral and the "disorders" experienced there; Benigna rushed through the funeral, with the result that many prominent magnates were unable to attend, and, in Zápolya’s estimation, the splendor and solemnity of the ceremony did not reach a level worthy of Kinizsi.

=== Second marriage ===
The tombstone of Marko Mišljenović, drawn by Flóris Rómer in 1863

With the death of her father in 1492 and her husband in 1494, Benigna became the sole heir of the huge Magyar–Kinizsi wealth. Weeks after Kinizsi's funeral, Benigna took over the administration of the estates, as evidenced by her petition on 21 December 1494 to Palatine Stephen Zápolya which concerned her claim to the estates of Lictenth and Agyaglik in Veszprém County against Emeric Himfi, a familiaris of Zápolya, who forcibly drove Benigna's stewards away from there. Following Kinizsi's death, Benigna continued to live in Nagyvázsony. Further construction projects can be attributed to her; a Renaissance white marble frame was almost certainly completed during her tenure.

Benigna got married to a Croatian noble Marko Mišljenović (Hungarian: kamicsáci Horvát Márk) in 1495, within a year of her first husband's death. As a royal courtier and chamberlain, he became ispán of Veszprém County after their wedding. In November 1495, Benigna requested King Vladislaus II to confirm her husband as the new owner of Nagyvázsony Castle. The Hungarian monarch fulfilled the request in June 1496. For Mišljenović, his marriage to Benigna brought significant social prestige. He functioned as Ban of Croatia, Dalmatia and Slavonia and captain of Senj from 1505 to 1507. Benigna extended the right to possess the Nagyvázsony estate to her husband's two brothers as well in January 1496. Mišljenović, who "inherited" from Benigna's first husband, Kinizsi, his network of social connections and political influence, and Benigna supported the claim of Tamás Bakócz against John Corvinus (King Matthias' son) concerning Corvin Castle. In February 1496, Benigna relinquished the castle of Solymos in Arad County (present-day Șoimuș, Romania) in favor of Bakócz, as the prelate had rendered significant services to her and her husband.

She possessed the town Debrecen as a pledge in 1498. John Corvinus made several attempts to recover the estate through legal channels, until he succeeded in 1500. In a letter, he suggested that Benigna and her husband did not respect the town's privileges and behaved like "oppressors." Over the years, the couple's name appears in numerous lawsuits they waged against their neighbors. They bought the villages Mojs and Felsővadicsó (present-day Mojš and Horný Vadičov in Slovakia, respectively), extending the lordship of Sztrecsény Castle, in 1504. Mišljenović was an influential participant of the Diet at Rákos in 1505, as castellan of Buda. As bans of Croatia, Mišljenović and Andrew Both de Bajna played important role in the defense against Turkish incursions in the southern provinces. King Vladislaus II dismissed them for their positions in the last days of 1507. Not long after, Mišljenović died in a horse-riding accident in Zagreb. Benigna also had a red marble sarcophagus carved for her second husband (completed in 1512) and had him buried next to Kinizsi in Nagyvázsony.

=== Third marriage ===
A letter of Hedwig of Cieszyn (Stephen Zápolya's widow) from July 1508 mentions that the soldiers of local landowners Caspar Szúnyog and Pancras Óvári robbed and killed the Vlach serfs of Benigna, causing a significant damage for her. In August 1508, King Vladislaus II granted several of Benigna's mortgaged estates to his chief chamberlain John Podmaniczky, including the castles Sztrecsény, Szucsány and the town Zsolna (Žilina). Benigna protested against the act, and with the support of the Zápolya family, she was able to defend her interests. Since the early 1490s, Stephen Zápolya concluded several contracts with Benigna regarding the Magyar–Kinizsi wealth, and thus had a vested interest in retaining it. The brothers John and George Zápolya subsequently laid claim to several estates (including Nagyrév) as well.

The old tower of Fort Vázsonykő

For the third time, Benigna remarried almost immediately. By March 1509, her husband was Gregory Kereki, when she reached an agreement with the relatives of her late second husband regarding the assets in March 1509; accordingly, her former brother-in-law, Ivan Mišljenović was granted the lordship of Adony, the villages Abony (with its manor) and Erk, while Benigna and Kereki retained the castles of Nagyvázsony, Sztrecsény and Szucsány with accessories, in addition to the settlements Zsolna, Kécske, Kürt and Sas. They divided the remaining estates equally between themselves. They jointly donated the estate Kerekegyháza to their familiaris Fabian Nagy de Varjas for his faithful service.

Compared to Benigna's first two husbands, Kereki was a nobleman of considerably more modest means. It is conceivable that he was a local nobleman (to which the prefix "de Vázsony" might refer) or had once belonged to Mišljenović's retinue. His nickname "Tar Gecő" (lit. "Greg the Bald") refers to his unattractive appearance and the fact that the locals did not treat him with respect. Historian Jenő Aigner portrayed Kereki as a fortune hunter. In June 1509, Kereki returned some districts to the town Zsolna, which Mišljenović had previously taken away from the burghers. He took action against his neighbors using violent methods. When John Kanizsai was declared a traitor by the royal court in 1513, he entered into an alliance with Kereki in order to salvage a portion of his wealth. With this, Kereki acquired the castle of Léka (present-day Lockenhaus, Austria), Csepreg (with its fort) and Keresztúr (present-day Deutschkreutz, Austria), from the possession of which the members of the Kanizsai family forbade him in 1516. Benigna expanded Sztrecsény Castle into a significant fortress. She donated the estates Mojs and Lucska to her former castellans, who participated in the financing of the construction. Benigna and Kereki were known for their violent raids and lootings in the region. Kereki was accused of killing John Majtényi's castellan, George Sárkány at the forest of Sztrecsény, in 1518; at this point, Benigna was also accused of complicity.

After the death of her first husband, Benigna continued to support the Paulines; in 1511, she bequeathed the estates Lictenth and Agyaglik to the monastery of the Paulines at Nagyvázsony. Therefore, the monks gifted another ornate prayer book to Benigna in 1513, later called as Czech Codex (see below). The text omits to mention Kereki's name and only refers to Kinizsi, Benigna's first husband, which perhaps suggests that the couple did not live together and that Kereki was not involved in the administration of the estate. In the 1510s, Benigna's religious devotion deepened, and she undertook several pilgrimages within Hungary. One of her destinations was the Holy Blood shrine in Báta. There, the lady donated a red velvet chasuble decorated with a gold cross (it cost 50 golden florins) to the friars. Benigna and her husband, Kereki (together with Kereki's mother, Catherine, and other nobles from Veszprém County) also went on a pilgrimage to Rome in the spring of 1518. She also established a mass endowment to the Paulines of Nagyvázsony, dedicated to Saint Michael, for the spiritual salvation of her family and herself in June 1519. After Kereki's death (see below), some documents referred to him as a royal courtier and aulic councilor.

==== Mariticide ====
According to contemporary sources, in 1519 Benigna hired assassins and had her third husband killed. Based on one account, the assailants threw Kereki out of a window of the residential tower of Nagyvázsony; his body lay unburied in the castle moat for quite some time. Benigna's motivation is unclear; Gábor Döbrentei considered that the lady had her husband killed out of jealousy, due to his dissolute lifestyle. Since Kereki was also known for forging documents (for which Vladislaus once reprimanded him), it is possible that he tried to acquire his wife's fortune, but this came to light, and Benigna took revenge.

For the determination of her involvement, Benigna came under the prosecution of the royal court. The case was investigated by Crown Prosecutor Albert Sárközi, whose notes regarding the matter have survived from August 1519. Accordingly, Benigna's estates were temporarily confiscated and placed under sequestration. She herself was summoned to appear before the court, but she was only willing to do so under a safe-conduct. Benigna's lawyer was Gregory Szentiványi during the hearing of the case. Benigna requested several postponements in the matter through her lawyer, yet she still failed to appear at the scheduled time. A witness, John Bobromizky, explicitly identified Benigna as the perpetrator of the murder. Sárközi also considered it incriminating for the defendant that she did not appear at the funeral of her husband, Kereki. Benigna did not pursue the killers; one of them, Egidius Kapusi, remained in the castle even later. Benigna offered no substantive defense, stating instead that her husband had ridden out with Kapusi, who later returned alone. Thereafter, the body was discovered by Pauline monks. She added that she did not appear at the funeral due to her illness. Sárközi also tried to question the castle servants, but the mistress of the castle sabotaged this. As a result, the prosecutor was determined to secure an arrest warrant against Benigna, but the barons sitting on the royal council did not support it.

A second note from Sárközi clearly indicates that certain barons openly intervened in the criminal case and took Benigna's side. Benigna's financial situation and social network saved her from punishment. In the midst of the lawsuit, Benigna even regained her estates, over which she could exercise free disposal. The barons held interests in the Magyar–Kinizsi fortune; one of them, John Zápolya, received certain castles and villages from Benigna to hold in trust. The powerful lord Lawrence Újlaki also took the noblewoman's side. Although Benigna was sentenced to death and confiscation of her all assets, but King Louis II, in the spring of 1520, granted mercy to Benigna, in consideration of the merits and services of her late father and her late husband, Pál Kinizsi, "through the intercession of some of her followers". The Hungarian monarch stipulated that, in the event of another similar transgression, the pardon would become void.

== Later life ==
The ruins of Lietava Castle

Although Benigna received a pardon, she could no longer remain within the social elite and was forced into internal exile. She gradually shifted her permanent residence and base of operations to her estates in Upper Hungary. In 1520, upon her order, her serfs of Zsolna seized the estate Zavoda (present-day a borough of the aforementioned city) from the Podmaniczky family. In April 1521, the relatives of her second husband Marko Mišljenović laid claim to several estates. Before the Knights Hospitaller convent at Székesfehérvár, she donated Adony and some surrounding lands to Matej and Andrej Tuškanič, for their services during her marriage with Mišljenović. Due to participation in the murder – notwithstanding the decision to grant a pardon – several estates reverted to the Crown. King Louis II donated Abony, Tószeg and Paládics to István Werbőczy in November 1522.

It is plausible that Benigna lived in her castle of Zsolnalitva in Trencsén County (present-day Lietava, Slovakia) after 1522. Louis II granted the royal right over Nagyvázsony to his wife Mary of Habsburg, which meant that should the estate revert to the Crown, the queen consort would have the authority to dispose of it. In 1524, Mary transferred this right to her lady-in-waiting, Katalin Svetkovics (who later became the spouse of Ferenc Batthyány). At this time, Benigna was still alive. Since both of her prayer books were discovered in Upper Hungary, it is likely that she spent her time in prayer, or perhaps even retired to a nunnery as an act of penance. She is last mentioned as a living person in July 1525. Given the layout of the Pauline monastery at Nagyvázsony, it is likely that Benigna intended to be buried alongside her first two husbands, but this did not come to pass. Following the Battle of Mohács in 1526, the Ottomans thoroughly ravaged Transdanubia, and as a result, these estates were lost to her. In 1527, King John Zápolya annulled his predecessor's letter of pardon and donated the lordship of Nagyvázsony to his faithful confidant Ferenc Bodó. This decision was intended to provide retroactive justification for the granting of the estate. Simultaneously, Werbőczy likewise obtained a royal charter for the estate. Whether Benigna was alive at this time is not clear.

== Prayer books ==
=== Festetics Codex ===
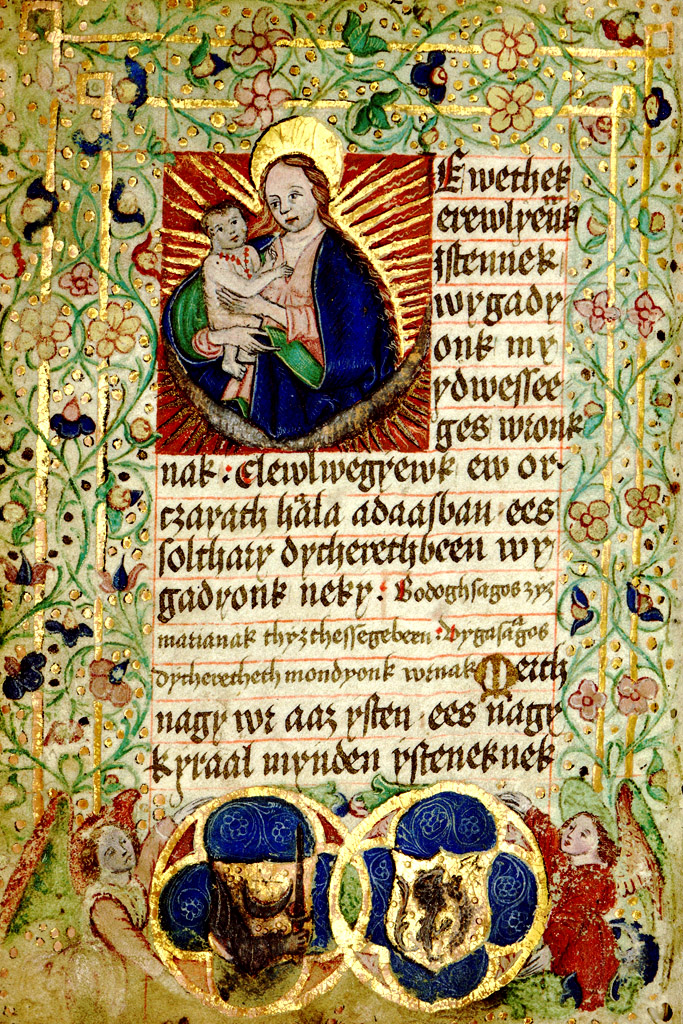
Front page of the Festetics Codex, depicting the coats-of-arms of Pál Kinizsi and Benigna Magyar (below)

Benigna's earlier Hungarian-language prayer book was compiled by the Pauline monks of Nagyvázsony sometime around 1492 or 1493. While preparing the manuscript, the monks learned that Kinizsi had fallen seriously ill, so they included a prayer for him in the codex as well. In several instances, the translator of the Psalms did not use the official ecclesiastical texts; for this reason, it is an important relic in the history of the Hungarian language and domestic liturgy. At the end of the book, Petrarch's Psalms of Confession and the beginning of the Gospel of John were translated. Damján Vargha considered that Benigna's prayer book was a rough translation of the Breviarium Strigoniense. György Volf proved that the book was a copy of a work that has already been lost, which may also be indicated by doubled vowels.

The codex is written on parchment and consists of 208 leaves; its initials and illuminations reflect a Renaissance influence. On the cover, alongside a depiction of the Virgin Mary and the Child Christ, appear the coats of arms of Kinizsi and Benigna, in their capacity as donors to the Pauline Order in Nagyvázsony. Its physical appearance and illustrations reflect the influence of the Buda workshop of manuscript illuminators, but the prayer book was almost certainly produced locally.

By the end of the 18th century, the prayer book became part of the collection of the library of the Festetics Palace in Keszthely, after which it was named. Then, in 1947, it was transferred to the National Széchényi Library (OSZK).

=== Czech Codex ===
The second prayer book is a 196-page Hungarian-language psalter, created and copied by a certain frater M., one of the Paulines of Nagyvázsony in 1513, as a supplement to the Festetics Codex for his lady Benigna Magyar. The author used black, red, and blue inks. It is conceivable that the book was created for the lady as a token of their gratitude, in recognition of the fact that, two years earlier, Benigna had provided significant donations to the monastery, thereby fulfilling the wishes of her first husband, Pál Kinizsi. Art historian Lajos Zsiray considered that the author is identical with Frater Matheus, an illuminator and bookbinder of the Carthusian monastery at Lövöld (near Városlőd), which had close cultural ties with the Paulines of Nagyvázsony. The Hungarian language of the codex contains a variant of the Transdanubian dialect. The text of the Czech Codex also served as a basis for copying the texts of other codices (for instance, Keszthely Codex, Thewrewk Codex and Apor Codex).

The codex became a property of the Dominican nuns of Margaret Island in the 16th century. To escape the Ottoman conquest, the book was taken to Nagyszombat (present-day Trnava, Slovakia). By the end of the 17th century, the codex was possessed by Countess Mária Viktória Balassa, who served as abbess of the Poor Clares monastery in Nagyszombat from 1691 to 1694. The prayer book was discovered by academic and politician János Czech in the Franciscans' library of Érsekújvár (present-day Nové Zámky, Slovakia) in 1833. The codex was named after him. It became part of the collection of the Hungarian Academy of Sciences library in 1851.

== Sources ==
- Aigner, Jenő (2022). Reneszánsz úrnő vagy Vázsonykő fekete özvegye? Kinizsi Pálné Magyar Benigna élete [A Renaissance Lady or the Black Widow of Vázsonykő? The Life of Benigna Magyar, Wife of Pál Kinizsi] (in Hungarian). Tortoma Könyvkiadó. ISBN 978-606-9716-48-9.
- C. Tóth, Norbert; Horváth, Richárd; Neumann, Tibor; Pálosfalvi, Tamás (2016). Magyarország világi archontológiája, 1458–1526, I. Főpapok és bárók [Secular Archontology of Hungary, 1458–1526, Volume I: Prelates and Barons] (in Hungarian). MTA Bölcsészettudományi Kutatóközpont Történettudományi Intézete. ISBN 978-963-4160-35-9.
- Gondán, Felicián (1912). "Kinizsyné Magyar Benigna imádságos könyvei [The Prayer Books of Benigna Magyar, Wife of Pál Kinizsi]". In Pintér, Jenő (ed.). Dolgozatok Békefi Remig egyetemi tanári működésének emlékére. Írták tanítványai (in Hungarian). Stephaneum. pp. 196–211.
- Lukcsics, Pál (1934). "Kinizsyné Magyar Benigna örökösei [The Heirs of Benigna Magyar, Wife of Pál Kinizsi]". Turul (in Hungarian). 48 (3–4). Magyar Heraldikai és Genealógiai Társaság: 66–75. ISSN 1216-7258.
