= Marko Mišljenović =

Croatian-Hungarian baron

- Reconstruction of the fragments of Mišljenović's tombstone, drawn by Flóris Rómer (1863)

Ban of Croatia, Dalmatia and Slavonia
- Reign: 1505–1507
- Predecessor: Andrew Both; Francis Balassa
- Successor: George Kanizsai; John Ernuszt
- Born: c. 1465
- Died: 1508; Zagreb, Croatia in personal union with Hungary
- Buried: Pauline monastery of Nagyvázsony, Hungary
- Noble family: House of Mišljenović
- Spouse: Benigna Magyar (m. 1495)

Marko Mišljenović od Uzdolja (Hungarian: uzdolyai Mislenovics Márk), also known as Mark Horváth of Kamičak (Latin: Marcus Horwath de Kamychach, Hungarian: kamicsáci Horvát Márk, Croatian: Marko Horvat od Kamičca; c. 1465 – January/February 1508), was a Croatian–Hungarian baron and soldier, who served as Ban of Croatia, Dalmatia and Slavonia between 1505 and 1507.

== Family background ==
Marko Mišljenović was born around 1465, into a Croatian noble family, which possessed estates in Dalmatia, including Uzdolje (present-day a borough of Biskupija), the Fortress of Klis and Kamičak Castle. An ancestor of the family, Ivan was styled as vice-ban of Croatia and captain of Zagreb in 1392, according to Hungarian archaeologist Flóris Rómer. Marko's parentage is uncertain. His brothers were Ivan (John) and Petar (Peter). The former served as castellan of the fort of Greben along the river Vrbas in 1494, while the latter possessed the castle of Kolunić (present-day both in Bosnia and Herzegovina).

== Early career ==
He entered the service of the Hungarian royal court at an early age. The family's castles played an important role in the defense of the southern border, helping to ward off intensifying Ottoman incursions. For their unspecified services, King Matthias Corvinus donated some estates throughout Croatia, Slavonia and the district of Dubica (today in Bosnia) to himand his brothers in August 1489, but their original owner prevented by force them the taking possession of the territories. The monarch instructed the cathedral chapter of Zagreb to send out their representatives to carry out the inauguration.

Mišljenović entered the royal court of King Vladislaus II. In November 1491, the monarch donated the lands of the disloyal Francis Jakcs de Kusaly to the brothers Marko and Ivan for the former's faithful services to the crown. He was mentioned as a royal familiaris and courtier throughout 1491–1495. In royal charters issued in Hungary, he was frequently called as "Horwath" (lit. "the Croatian"), which became his alternative family name. He was styled as royal chamberlain from 1494 to 1496.

== Marriage and rise ==
=== Estate affairs ===
Marko Mišljenović married the Hungarian noblewoman Benigna Magyar, the widow of the famous military general Pál Kinizsi, sometime in 1495. The circumstances of the marriage are unknown, but since it took place within a year of Kinizsi's death, it can be assumed that they were already acquainted. Perhaps Mišljenović had fought under Kinizsi's banner against the Turks along the southern frontier prior to that. He was probably about the same age as his wife. With the marriage, Mišljenović "inherited" the position of ispán of Veszprém County, which, before that, Kinizsi held until his death. Mišljenović, however, enjoyed only half of the county's revenue, because Vladislaus II returned the other half to the Diocese of Veszprém in February 1495. He held the dignity until 20 July 1496, when the Hungarian monarch returned the other half of the office to its perpetual count, the bishop John Vitéz as well.

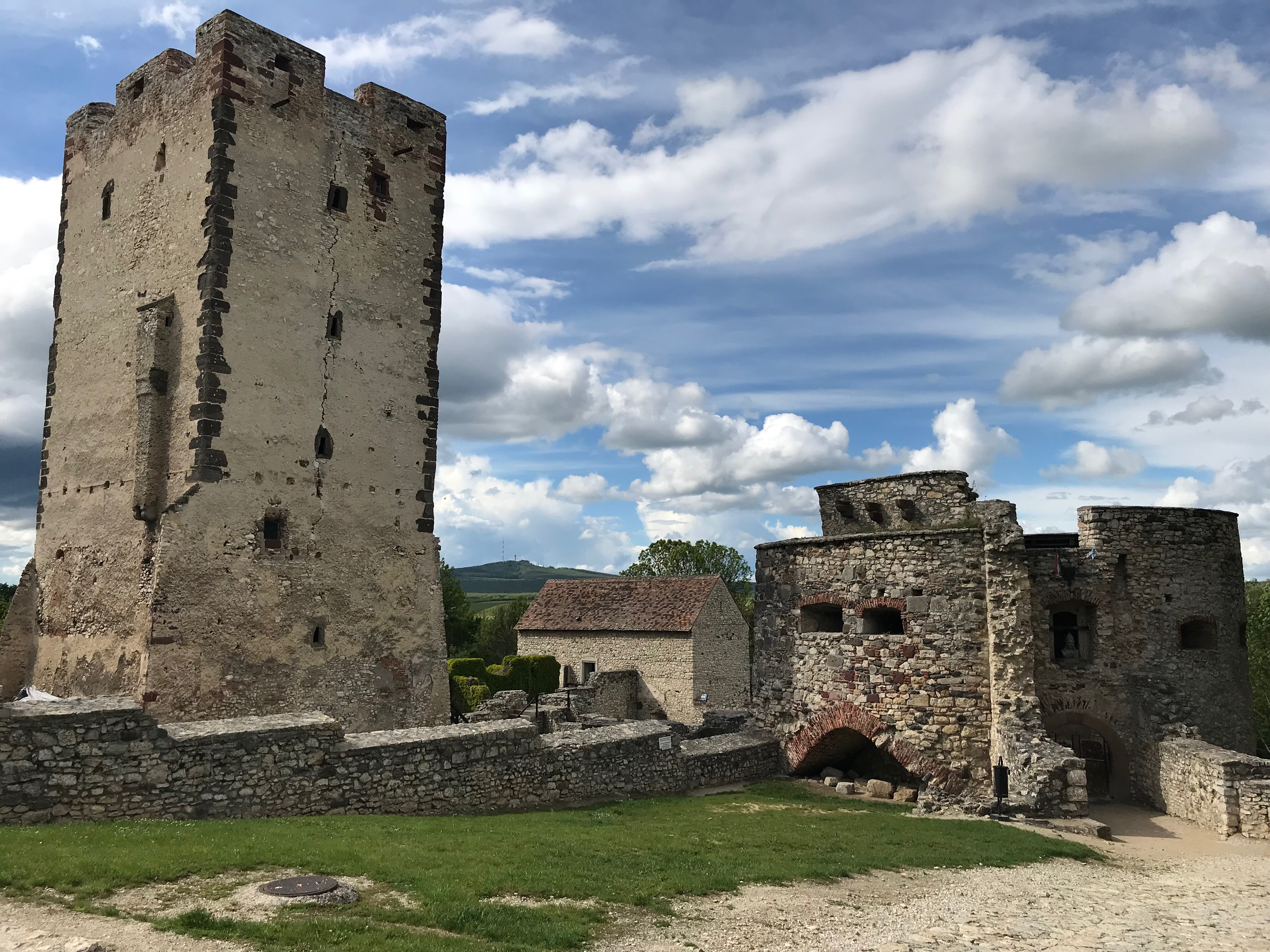
The castle of Nagyvázsony

In November 1495, Benigna requested King Vladislaus II to confirm her husband as the new owner of the lordship of Nagyvázsony (Vázsonykő). The Hungarian monarch fulfilled the request in June 1496. For Mišljenović, his marriage to Benigna brought significant social prestige. Benigna extended the right to possess the Nagyvázsony estate to her husband's two brothers, Ivan and Petar, as well in January 1496. Mišljenović, who "inherited" from Benigna's first husband, Kinizsi, his network of social connections and political influence, and Benigna supported the claim of Tamás Bakócz against John Corvinus (King Matthias' son) concerning Corvin Castle. In February 1496, Benigna relinquished the castle of Solymos in Arad County (present-day Șoimuș, Romania) in favor of Bakócz, as the prelate had rendered significant services to her and her husband. In June 1496, Mišljenović was involved in an exchange of estates with Peter Geréb de Vingárt. In the same year, upon his request, King Vladislaus II exempted the Vlach population of the village Béla belonging to Sztrecsény Castle (present-day Belá and Strečno in Slovakia, respectively) from paying the extraordinary military tax; a privilege they had enjoyed since the time of Matthias. In January 1497, his officials in Tószeg were embroiled into a conflict involving physical violence with the serfs of Bakócz. According to a Veszprém County account book from around the same time, a huge fire ravaged the estates of Bakócz and Mišljenović (in Nagyszőlős, Berzseny, Dabrony and Kerta). Therefore, they did not collect the tax on 76 plots of land.

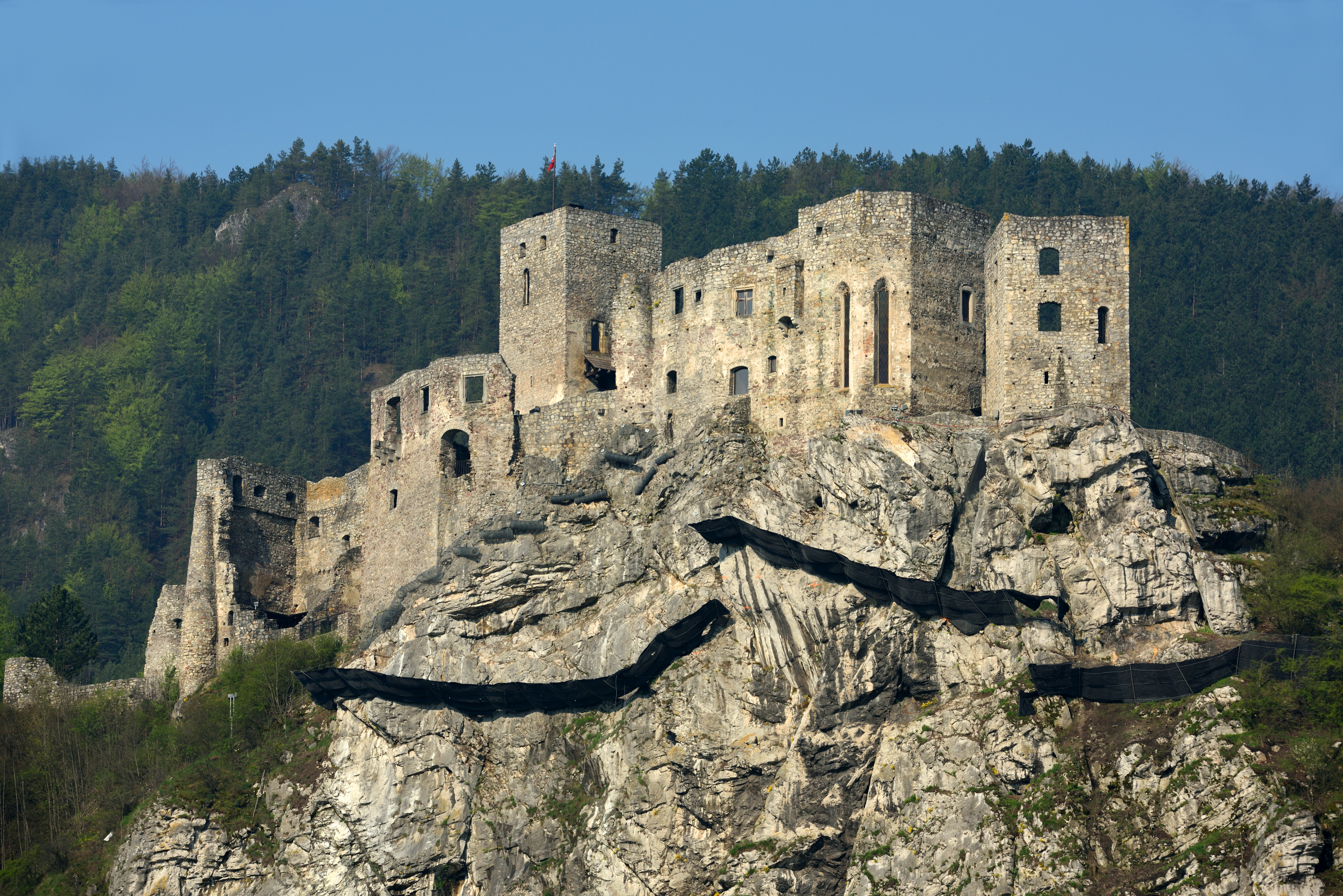
Strečno Castle (Sztrecsény), present-day in Slovakia

Concerning their estates in Upper Hungary, Mišljenović and his wife had a series of conflicts with the neighboring lord Caspar Szunyog. They were already in a legal dispute with each other in 1497. Eight years later, Szunyog dragged along one of Mišljenović's serfs from Felsővadicsó (present-day Horný Vadičov in Slovakia). Szunyog also destroyed the bridge over the Vág River near Zsolna (Žilina), which was a property of Mišljenović and Benigna. They also possessed the town Debrecen as a pledge in 1498. John Corvinus made several attempts to recover the estate through legal channels, until he succeeded in 1500. In a letter, he suggested that Benigna and Mišljenović did not respect the town's privileges and behaved like "oppressors." Over the years, the couple's name appears in numerous lawsuits they waged against their neighbors. They bought the villages Mojs and Felsővadicsó, extending the lordship of Sztrecsény Castle, in 1504. Mišljenović exerted influence over Almád Abbey too; one of his Croatian relatives served as abbot there. In the spring of 1508, this cleric was described as a drunkard and careless person, under whom the ecclesiastical buildings fell into disrepair and the monastery's serfs were relocated to the castle of Nagyvázsony. Mišljenović even seized the village Almád, the core estate of the abbey.

=== Offices and royal commissions ===
In accordance with the Act XXII of 1498, Mišljenović was among those dozen lords, who were privileged to lead their peoples under their own banners (i.e. banderium) to the king's camp in the event of a military campaign. He acted as an arbiter in a lawsuit between the Perényis and Drágfis at the court of Palatine Stephen Zápolya in 1498. He attended the national diet at Tolna as a royal chamberlain in September 1501, which sought to decide on the campaign against the Ottomans. Thereafter, he was a member of the royal entourage of Vladislaus II, when the king traveled to the Kingdom of Bohemia, where he spent months between the end of 1501 and the spring of 1502. Prior to that, Mišljenović received money for sixteen horsemen from tax collectors, who sought to collect the extraordinary tax voted by the Diet. In September 1503, Mišljenović and the Polish envoy Jakób Buczacki were sent to the court of Stephen the Great, Voivode of Moldavia at Suceava, where they held preliminary negotiations on the technical preparation of the arbitration of the Hungarian envoys in the Moldavian–Polish territorial dispute.

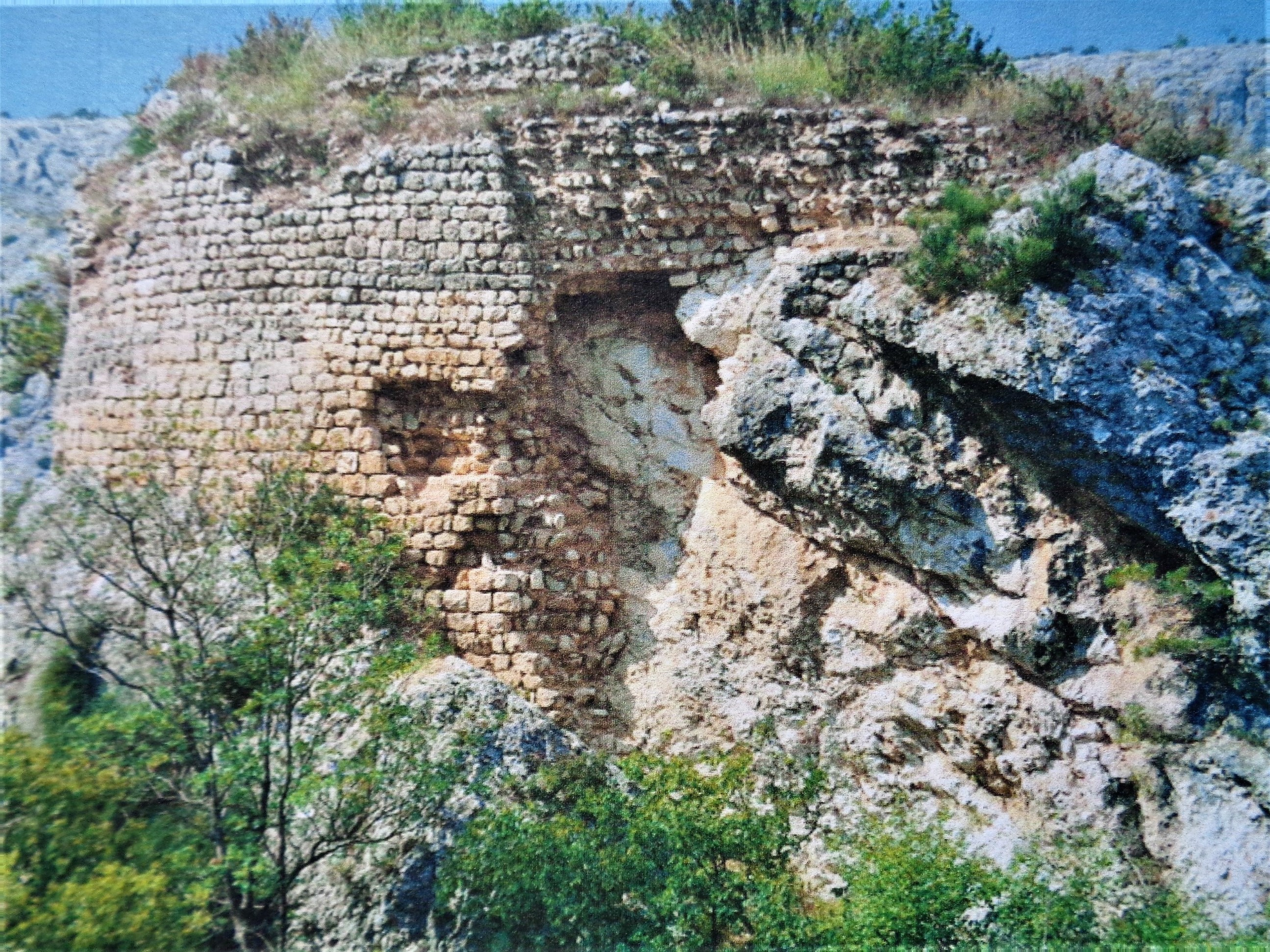
The ruins of Kamičak Castle in Croatia

Mišljenović was appointed castellan of Buda, the Hungarian royal capital, in 1505. In this capacity, he attended the Diet at Rákos in that year (September–October), where the nobles passed a bill which prohibited the election of a foreigner as king if King Vladislaus II died without male issue. He was one of the signatories of the diet's resolutions. He (identified as "Marcus Croacus") was also involved in the establishment of a new cannon-founding workshop by Johannes Mauthier in Buda. Shortly after, King Vladislaus appointed Mišljenović as Ban of Croatia, Dalmatia and Slavonia and instructed him on 30 November 1505 to travel to the province and assume his office. Beside that, he also became captain of Senj. He held both positions jointly with Andrew Both de Bajna. Mišljenović was chosen as ban, because the Slavonian estates did not accept his predecessor, Francis Balassa, since he did not possess castles in the province. By February 1506, both bans took their positions, since their deputies issued documents in Križevci. Nevertheless, in 1506, the functioning of the office was hindered due to resistance from the Slavonian nobility, who supported Beatrice de Frangepan, the widow of John Corvinus. Mišljenović stayed in Buda in November 1506. King Vladislaus entrusted the two bans with the protection of the Paulines' estates in Slavonia against neighboring lords, including Caspar Alapi, a former vice-ban.

With this appointment, Mišljenović became one of the powerful barons of the realm. In June 1507, Vladislaus II ordered Both and Mišljenović to forcibly reclaim the estates – unlawfully held by Antun Blagajski – that belonged to his brother, Count Grgur, and, if necessary, he ordered the Croatian and Slavonian estates to take up arms. The two bans summoned a general assembly to Križevci in August 1507. In addition to discussing the usual matters, the nobles who appeared under arms and the bans entered into a mutual alliance against the "powerful ones and lords who lived outside the law". This may perhaps have been a consequence of the Hungarian Diet in April 1507, whose resolutions, favoring the lesser nobility, were not ratified by the king. In November 1507, Andrew Both was briefly arrested and forced to hand over the castle Siklós to Palatine Emeric Perényi. After the conflict between the two of them did not subside (since Both refused to hand over the castle), Vladislaus II dismissed the two bans, Both and Mišljenović upon the request of the royal council under the influence of Perényi in December 1507. The two bans did not acknowledge their dismissal. In the last days of December, Andrew Both and Marko Mišljenović ordered their vice-bans that the Slavonian nobility be summoned to Križevci and a general mobilization was ordered against Perényi and the barons preparing to take over the banate. Both of them were styled themselves bans, despite Vladislaus appointed George Kanizsai and John Ernuszt as their successors in early January 1508. While Perényi's army besieged and captured Siklós, Both and Mišljenović stayed in Topusko on 24 January 1508. There, they convened a Slavonian provincial assembly for 14 February to Križevci.

== Death and aftermath ==
Amidst the political turmoil, Marko Mišljenović died in a horse-riding accident in Zagreb in January or February 1508. He did not die immediately, for Franjo Frankopan, who later became the Archbishop of Kalocsa, mentioned in his 1543 last will that, back when he was a young canon in Zagreb, Mišljenović had given him 400 gold coins and several silver goblets on his deathbed, in exchange for having a Mass celebrated for the repose of his soul in the cathedral every single day. However, even decades later, this had still not taken place. It is merely a hypothesis that his death was, in fact, an assassination carried out at the behest of his political opponents (Perényi and his allies).

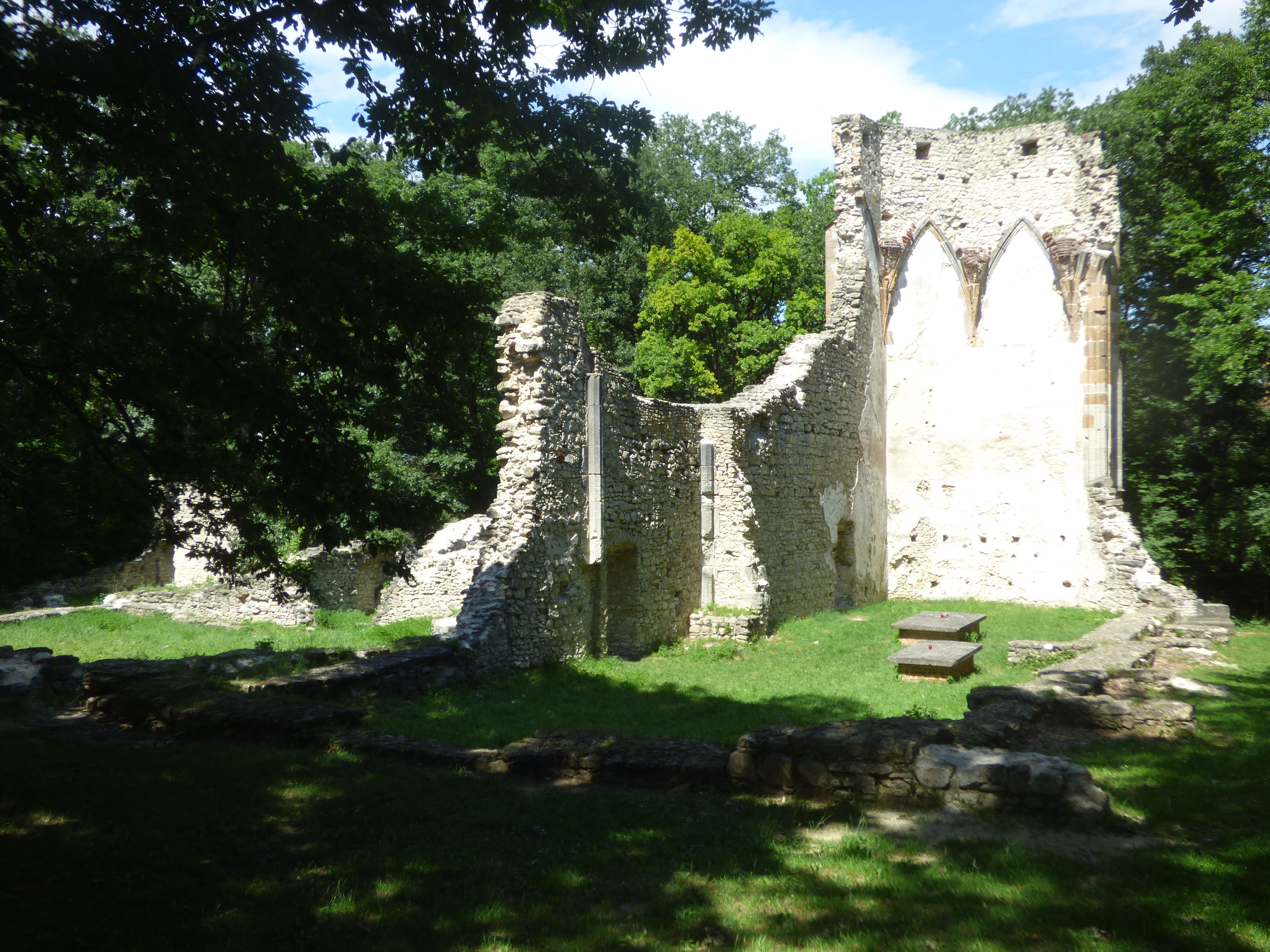
The ruins of the Pauline monastery in Nagyvázsony

Reconstruction of the fragments of Mišljenović's tombstone, drawn by István Möller (1913)

Marko Mišljenović was buried in the Pauline monastery of St. Michael in Nagyvázsony. His widow, Benigna Magyar, with whom his marriage remained childless, had a red marble sarcophagus carved for her second husband and had him buried in the nave of the church, near the triumphal arch (while Kinizsi was buried under the central axis of the sanctuary). A record concerning the tombstone indicates 1512 as the year of death, which is impossible: Benigna was already the wife of Gregory Kereki in 1509. It is likely that the year indicates when the gravestone was completed. After his death, Mišljenović's family demanded a share of the extensive Magyar–Kinizsi heritage. In March 1509, Benigna Magyar reached an agreement with the relatives of her late second husband regarding the assets; accordingly, her former brother-in-law, Ivan Mišljenović was granted the lordship of Adony, the villages Abony (with its manor) and Erk, while Benigna and her third husband, Kereki retained the castles of Nagyvázsony, Sztrecsény and Szucsány with accessories, in addition to the settlements Zsolna, Kécske, Kürt and Sas. They divided the remaining estates equally between themselves. They jointly donated the estate Kerekegyháza to their familiaris Fabian Nagy de Varjas for his faithful service. After Benigna had murdered her third husband in 1519, although she was pardoned in the next year, demands upon her have increased; in April 1521, the relatives of Mišljenović laid claim to several estates. Before the Knights Hospitaller convent at Székesfehérvár, she donated Adony and some surrounding lands to Matej and Andrej Tuškanič, for their services during her marriage with Mišljenović. The descendants of Matej became owners of the lordship of Nagyvázsony after the Battle of Mohács (1526). The last member of the family was Matija, who died in 1647. King Ferdinand III donated the lordship of Nagyvázsony to Count István Zichy in 1649.

Mišljenović's grave and nine fragments of the red marble cover slab of his tomb monument, together with Kinizsi's grave and its fragments, were discovered in 1768. The local officialis of the Zichy manor buried the two carcasses next to the local parish church, while the red marble fragments were incorporated into the walls of the Zichy Mansion. After 1851, the fragments were kept in the granary. Here, the archaeologist Flóris Rómer studied the remains in detail and made drawings of them in 1863. Thereafter, the stones were transported to the park of the Zichy Palace in Sárszentmihály, where they were put on display. They were rediscovered here by architect István Möller in 1903. Count Rafael Zichy donated the two tombstones to the Matthias Church of Budapest in 1909, which then were walled into the southern vestibule. After 1927, the fragments of the tombstones of Kinizsi and Mišljenović became part of the lapidarium of the Fisherman's Bastion. In 1957, the remains of the two funerary monuments were returned to the restored chapel of the castle at Nagyvázsony. During the 1950s–1960s excavations, further fragments were also uncovered. The fragments of the tomb's sarcophagus, which had been incorporated as building material into certain residential houses in the early 18th century, were purchased by the Hungarian National Gallery in 1989. The surviving reliefs on Kinizsi's tomb were far more ornate and elaborate, whereas the sequence of scenes (a hunting scene) on Mišljenović's relief is much more schematic and less developed. This difference also reflects the disparity in their social status. Mišljenović's tombstone was less expensive; the master carver was not among the top-tier artisans, but rather catered through his work to the needs of the wealthy, landowning gentry.

== Sources ==
- Aigner, Jenő (2022). Reneszánsz úrnő vagy Vázsonykő fekete özvegye? Kinizsi Pálné Magyar Benigna élete [A Renaissance Lady or the Black Widow of Vázsonykő? The Life of Benigna Magyar, Wife of Pál Kinizsi] (in Hungarian). Tortoma Könyvkiadó. ISBN 978-606-9716-48-9.
- C. Tóth, Norbert; Horváth, Richárd; Neumann, Tibor; Pálosfalvi, Tamás (2016). Magyarország világi archontológiája, 1458–1526, I. Főpapok és bárók [Secular Archontology of Hungary, 1458–1526, Volume I: Prelates and Barons] (in Hungarian). MTA Bölcsészettudományi Kutatóközpont Történettudományi Intézete. ISBN 978-963-4160-35-9.
- C. Tóth, Norbert; Horváth, Richárd; Neumann, Tibor; Pálosfalvi, Tamás; W. Kovács, András (2017). Magyarország világi archontológiája, 1458–1526, II. Megyék [Secular Archontology of Hungary, 1458–1526, Volume II: Counties] (in Hungarian). MTA Bölcsészettudományi Kutatóközpont Történettudományi Intézete. ISBN 978-963-4160-85-4.
- Éri, István; Sedlmayr, János (2004). "Kinizsi Pál és Horváth Márk nagyvázsonyi síremlékeinek története és rajzi rekonstrukciója [The History and Graphical Reconstruction of the Nagyvázsony Tombs of Pál Kinizsi and Márk Horváth]". Magyar Múzeumok (in Hungarian). 10 (3). Pulszky Társaság – Magyar Múzeumi Egyesület: 11–17. ISSN 1219-4662.
- Lukcsics, Pál (1934). "Kinizsyné Magyar Benigna örökösei [The Heirs of Benigna Magyar, Wife of Pál Kinizsi]". Turul (in Hungarian). 48 (3–4). Magyar Heraldikai és Genealógiai Társaság: 66–75. ISSN 1216-7258.
- Markó, László (2006). A magyar állam főméltóságai Szent Istvántól napjainkig: Életrajzi Lexikon [Great Officers of State in Hungary from King Saint Stephen to Our Days: A Biographical Encyclopedia] (in Hungarian). Helikon Kiadó. ISBN 963-547-085-1.
- Pálosfalvi, Tamás (2009). "Bajnai Both András és a szlavón bánság. Szlavónia, Európa és a törökök, 1504–1513 [Andrew Both of Bajna and the Banate of Slavonia (Slavonia, Europe and the Ottomans 1504–1513)]". In Neumann, Tibor; Rácz, György (eds.). Honoris causa. Tanulmányok Engel Pál tiszteletére (Analecta mediaevalia III) (in Hungarian). PPKE Történettudományi Intézete. pp. 251–300. ISBN 978-963-9627-25-3.

Marko House of Mišljenović Born: ? Died: 1508
Political offices
Preceded by Andrew Both & Francis Balassa	Ban of Croatia, Dalmatia and Slavonia alongside Andrew Both; 1505–1507	Succeeded by George Kanizsai & John Ernuszt
