= Francis Ernuszt =

Hungarian noble and royal chamberlain

- Born: c. 1500
- Died: 29 August 1526; Mohács, Hungary
- Noble family: House of Ernuszt
- Spouse: Elizabeth Ungnad
- Issue: none
- Father: John II Ernuszt
- Mother: Margaret of Sagan

Francis Ernuszt de Csáktornya (Hungarian: csáktornyai Ernuszt Ferenc; c. 1500 – 29 August 1526), also known as Francis Hampó, was a Hungarian noble and royal chamberlain in the court of Louis II of Hungary.

== Family ==
He was a member of the Ernuszt noble family of Jewish origin, founded by his paternal grandfather, John I Ernuszt. Francis was the eldest son of John II Ernuszt, Ban of Croatia, Dalmatia and Slavonia and his second wife, Princess Margaret of Sagan (Żagań), daughter of Jan II the Mad. He had a younger brother, John III. His uncle was Sigismund, Bishop of Pécs. Through his mother, he was also a half-brother of John Bánffy, Palatine of Hungary, author Katalin Bánffy and Margit Bánffy, spouse of John II Both de Bajna (killed in the Siege of Belgrade in 1521), later John Dombai. After his mother's death, his father married Barbara Ország. From this marriage, Francis also had two half-brothers, Farkas and Caspar, who was the last male member of the Ernuszt family.

He married Elizabeth Ungnad, the queen's maid of honor in 1526. Their marriage did not produce children, because Francis Ernuszt was soon killed in the Battle of Mohács on 29 August 1526. The family property was inherited by his younger brother Caspar following his father's death around 1528.

== Ancestors ==
Ancestors of Francis Ernuszt

4. John I Ernuszt
2. John II Ernuszt
5. Catherine N
1. Francis Ernuszt
24. Henry VIII the Sparrow
12. Jan I of Żagań
25. Katharina of Opole
6. Jan II the Mad
26. Rudolf III, Duke of Saxe-Wittenberg
13. Scholastika of Saxe-Wittenberg
27. Anna of Meissen
3. Margaret of Żagań
28. Přemek I, Duke of Opava
14. William, Duke of Opava
29. Catherine of Münsterberg
7. Katharina of Opava
30. Půta III of Častolovice
15. Salome of Častolovice
31. Anna of Koldice

== Sources ==
- Kubinyi, András (2001). "Ernuszt Zsigmond pécsi püspök rejtélyes halála és hagyatékának sorsa: A magyar igazságszolgáltatás nehézségei a középkor végén [The Mysterious Death of Zsigmond Ernuszt, Bishop of Pécs, and the Fate of His Heritage]". Századok (in Hungarian). 135 (2). Magyar Történelmi Társulat: 301–361. ISSN 0039-8098.
- Markó, László (2006). A magyar állam főméltóságai Szent Istvántól napjainkig: Életrajzi Lexikon [Great Officers of State in Hungary from King Saint Stephen to Our Days: A Biographical Encyclopedia] (in Hungarian). Helikon Kiadó. ISBN 963-547-085-1.
- Wehli, Tünde (2012). "A három Ernuszt [Three from the Ernuszt Family]". Budapesti Könyvszemle (in Hungarian). 24 (2). Budapesti Könyvszemle Alapítvány: 142–151. ISSN 0865-4247.
