= Caspar Ernuszt =

Hungarian noble

- Born: c. 1518
- Died: 1540
- Noble family: House of Ernuszt
- Spouse: Anna Keglević
- Issue: none
- Father: John II Ernuszt
- Mother: Barbara Ország

Caspar Ernuszt de Csáktornya (Hungarian: csáktornyai Ernuszt Gáspár; c. 1518 – after 27 June 1540) was a Hungarian noble, the last male member of the Ernuszt family.

== Life ==
He was a member of a Hungarian-Croatian noble family of Jewish origin, founded by his paternal grandfather, John I Ernuszt. Caspar was the youngest son of John II Ernuszt, Ban of Croatia, Dalmatia and Slavonia and his third wife, Barbara Ország. He had an elder brother Farkas, mentioned in records between 1522 and 10 September 1528. He also had two elder half-brothers, Francis and John III through his father and a half-brother (Sigismund) through his mother. John II Ernuszt also adopted his second wife Margaret of Sagan's orphans, John Bánffy, Palatine of Hungary, author Katalin Bánffy and Margaret Bánffy.

He married Anna Keglević, daughter of Petar Keglević, Ban of Croatia in 1539. Their marriage did not produce children.

Caspar took part in many battles against the Ottomans, leading his banderium, a kind of military unit, and even counter-attacked the enemy in already occupied parts of Croatia and Slavonia. Nevertheless, Ottoman numerical superiority was decisive and Croats were forced to retreat more and more to the west and northwest. One of the ways used for population to flee lead through the Caspar's Međimurje County. He himself helped people by setting ferries on the Drava and Mura river which enabled the refugees to cross them and go further north to reach western Hungary, which was still not occupied.

Following his father's death in 1528, Caspar inherited all of the family possessions and became lord of Csáktornya (Čakovec, Croatia), as his brother Francis was killed in the Battle of Mohács, and his two other brothers, John III and Farkas had died by 1528. Following his father's death, Caspar initiated a new lawsuit in August 1536 in the charge of the falsification of his uncle Sigismund Ernuszt's last will and embezzlement of the Ernuszt heritage (1,3 million gold florins) in 1505. But no judgment was ever proclaimed. According to Ban Ferenc Batthyány's one letter, Caspar was already sick on 27 June 1540. Caspar died before the suit came to an end. With his death the whole Ernuszt family disappeared. After Caspar's death, his father-in-law Petar Keglević assumed ownership of his possessions in Međimurje.

== Sources ==
- Kubinyi, András (2001). "Ernuszt Zsigmond pécsi püspök rejtélyes halála és hagyatékának sorsa: A magyar igazságszolgáltatás nehézségei a középkor végén [The Mysterious Death of Zsigmond Ernuszt, Bishop of Pécs, and the Fate of His Heritage]". Századok (in Hungarian). 135 (2). Magyar Történelmi Társulat: 301–361. ISSN 0039-8098.
- Wehli, Tünde (2012). "A három Ernuszt [Three from the Ernuszt Family]". Budapesti Könyvszemle. 24 (2). Budapesti Könyvszemle Alapítvány: 142–151. ISSN 0865-4247.
