= Kamičak (disambiguation) =

Kamičak may refer to:

- Kamičak, a village in the municipality of Ključ, Bosnia and Herzegovina
- Kamičak Castle, a ruined medieval fortified residential structure in Krka National Park, Croatia
- Kamičak Fortress, a fortified structure in Sinj, Split-Dalmatia County, Croatia
- Kamičak Fortress (Ključ), a fortified structure near Ključ, Una-Sana Canton, Bosnia and Herzegovina
