= John II Ernuszt =

Hungarian baron

John (II) Ernuszt

Ban of Croatia, Dalmatia and Slavonia
- Reign: 1508–1510
- Predecessor: Andrew Both; Marko Mišljenović
- Successor: Andrew Both
- Born: c. 1465
- Died: after 20 November 1528
- Noble family: House of Ernuszt
- Spouses: 1, Anna Pálóci; 2, Margaret of Sagan; 3, Barbara Ország
- Issue: Francis; John III; Farkas; Caspar
- Father: John I Ernuszt
- Mother: Catherine N

John Ernuszt de Csáktornya, Jr. (Hungarian: csáktornyai Ernuszt János; c. 1465 – after 20 November 1528), also known as John Hampó, was a Hungarian baron, who served as Ban of Croatia, Dalmatia and Slavonia between 1508 and 1510.

== Family ==
He was born around 1465 into a Hungarian noble family of Jewish origin as the younger son of John I Ernuszt and a certain Catherine from an unidentified family. His elder brother was Sigismund, who was born around 1445 and Matthias Corvinus made him Bishop of Pécs in 1473.

John II married three times during his lifetime. His first wife was Anna Pálóci, the only daughter of Emeric Pálóci and Dorothy Rozgonyi. Anna died in 1494, when John II was around thirty years old. Following that (around 1500) he married Princess Margaret of Sagan (Żagań), daughter of Jan II the Mad and widow of Nicholas Bánffy de Alsólendva. Their marriage produced two sons, Francis, who was killed in the Battle of Mohács in 1526, and John III. John Ernuszt also adopted his wife's children from her first marriage; John Bánffy, Palatine of Hungary, author Katalin Bánffy, Petronella Bánffy and Margaret Bánffy. He governed the Verőce branch of the Bánffy family's estates on behalf of his minor stepson. John II became a widower for the second time between around 1507 and 1513. Towards the end of his life, he married Barbara Ország, daughter of the late Ladislaus Ország and Magdalene Maróti. Her first husband was George Drágfi. They had two sons: Farkas and Caspar, who was the last male member of the Ernuszt family.

== Career ==
He first appeared in contemporary records in 1470, still a minor. While his elder brother became bishop and held various positions in the royal court, John II managed the family estates in Csáktornya (Čakovec) and Međimurje (today in Croatia). He ordered the fortification and modernization of the castle in Csáktornya and several churches were built in this period. In 1486, he was mentioned as Master of the cupbearers, holding the dignity concurrelly with George Turóci.

Sigismund and John made several attempts to regain the estates that Matthias Corvinus had confiscated from their father in the early 1470s. They persuaded the late King's illegitimate son, John Corvinus to give them their father's former copper mines at Besztercebánya (now Banská Bystrica in Slovakia) in 1494. Before long, they leased the mines to John and George Thurzó for 10 years. They also regained Szklabonya (Sklabiná in Slovakia) from Anton Poki, a retainer of John Corvinus. The Ernuszt brothers who held more than 3,500 peasant households were among the wealthiest landowners in Hungary in 1494.

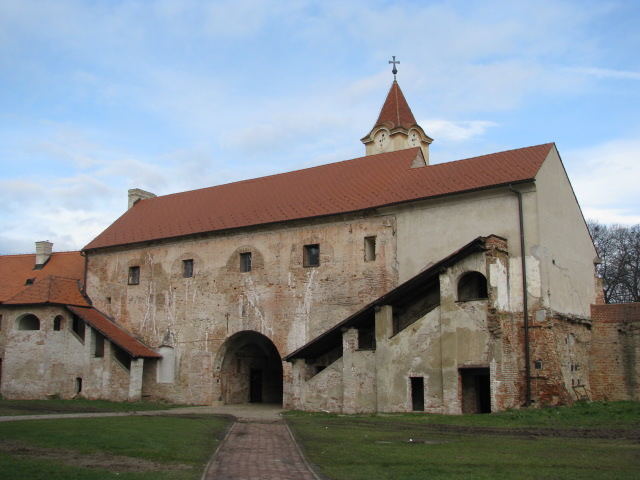
Čakovec (Csáktornya) Castle

John Ernuszt was appointed Master of the horse by King Vladislaus II in 1493, following the death of Ladislaus Ország, father of John's future third wife. He held that dignity until 1505, when he was replaced by George Báthory. In 1495, he received the estate of Munkács (Mukacheve, Ukraine) from the King. According to contemporary sources, John Ernuszt, Jr. was much less brilliant mind than his father and brother – Hans Dernschwam, commercial trustee of the Fuggers in Hungary characterized him as a "simple-minded pious man" (German: ein freÿer einfältiger Mann). In 1503, he was excommunicated by the Holy See due to physical abuse of the local schoolmaster in Verőce (Virovitica, Croatia), however the Diocese of Pécs acquitted him.

His brother, Bishop Sigismund was murdered in summer 1505. His three retainers (John Gyulai, Louis Szerecsen and Albert Cupi) strangled him to seize his wealth. Sigismund's legal heir was his younger brother, John according to his last will to avoid full confiscation for the royal treasury. John Ernuszt brought charges against the assassins in spring 1506, also accusing them of misappropriation of the Ernuszt property. However they were never sentenced. During the investigation which followed the murder, 300,000 gold florins were found and confiscated for the royal treasury. As a compensation, John Ernuszt was appointed Ban of Croatia, Dalmatia and Slavonia in January 1508. He rented out the royal copper mines to the Thurzó–Fugger company for three years in exchange for 20 gold florins annually.

In 1514, John initiated a second lawsuit against the three retainers before Archbishop Thomas Bakócz, who also acted as a papal legate during that time. John's lawyers accused the suspects of murder, the falsification of Sigismund's last will and embezzlement of 1,3 million gold florins. The ecclesiastical court ruled in the favour of John Ernuszt, however the text of the judgment is not accurately known. Nevertheless, both plaintiff and the defendants appealed to Pope Leo X. The Hungarian royal court, for political reasons and intricate relationship between the baronial groups, prevented the lawsuit continued abroad. Following John's death, his only living son Caspar has initiated a new trial in 1536, however he died in 1540 and the House of Ernuszt became extinct, making the lawsuit is obsolete.

For the war against the Ottoman Empire, John sent his troops to the royal army of Louis II. His son, Francis Ernuszt was killed in the Battle of Mohács on 29 August 1526. John's other sons were still minors during that time. The Hungarian throne was empty, John Zápolya and the Habsburgs both claimed it for themselves. John Ernuszt became a supporter of King John. Following the military setbacks, Ernuszt took an oath of allegiance to Ferdinand I during the latter's coronation in Székesfehérvár on 5 November 1527. He was last mentioned by records on 20 November 1528.

== Sources ==
- C. Tóth, Norbert; Horváth, Richárd; Neumann, Tibor; Pálosfalvi, Tamás (2016). Magyarország világi archontológiája, 1458–1526, I. Főpapok és bárók [Secular Archontology of Hungary, 1458–1526, Volume I: Prelates and Barons] (in Hungarian). MTA Bölcsészettudományi Kutatóközpont Történettudományi Intézete. ISBN 978-963-4160-35-9.
- Fedeles, Tamás (2010). Püspökök, prépostok, kanonokok: Fejezetek Pécs középkori egyháztörténetéből [Bishops, Provosts, Canons: Chapters from the Medieval Church History of Pécs] (in Hungarian). Szegedi Tudományegyetem Történeti Intézet. ISBN 978-963-482-990-4.
- Kubinyi, András (2000). "Egy különös középkori per. Ernuszt Zsigmond püspök meggyilkolása és hagyatéka elsikkasztása". História (in Hungarian). 22 (4).
- Kubinyi, András (2001). "Ernuszt Zsigmond pécsi püspök rejtélyes halála és hagyatékának sorsa: A magyar igazságszolgáltatás nehézségei a középkor végén [The Mysterious Death of Zsigmond Ernuszt, Bishop of Pécs, and the Fate of His Heritage]". Századok (in Hungarian). 135 (2). Magyar Történelmi Társulat: 301–361. ISSN 0039-8098.
- Markó, László (2006). A magyar állam főméltóságai Szent Istvántól napjainkig: Életrajzi Lexikon [Great Officers of State in Hungary from King Saint Stephen to Our Days: A Biographical Encyclopedia] (in Hungarian). Helikon Kiadó. ISBN 963-547-085-1.
- Wehli, Tünde (2012). "A három Ernuszt [Three from the Ernuszt Family]". Budapesti Könyvszemle (in Hungarian). 24 (2). Budapesti Könyvszemle Alapítvány: 142–151.

John II House of Ernuszt Born: c. 1465 Died: after 20 November 1528
Political offices
Preceded by George Turóci	Master of the cupbearers alongside George Turóci; 1486	Succeeded by George Turóci
Preceded by Ladislaus Ország	Master of the horse 1493–1505	Succeeded by George Báthory
Preceded by Andrew Both & Marko Mišljenović	Ban of Croatia, Dalmatia and Slavonia alongside George Kanizsai; 1508–1510	Succeeded by Andrew Both
