= Economic reforms of Matthias Corvinus =

Reforms in Hungary, 1458 to 1490

Matthias Corvinus, or Matthias I, ruled the Kingdom of Hungary from 1458 to 1490. His reign is widely regarded as the golden age of Hungary, marked with territorial expansion and consolidation of monarchial power. Matthias’s territorial ambitions frequently brought his realm into conflict with neighboring states, such as the Ottoman Empire, Poland, Bohemia, and the Holy Roman Empire. To meet his demand for a professional defense force, Matthias established one of the first standing armies at the time, the Black Army of Hungary. Matthias was successful in delivering the financial resources required to maintain such a large standing army. Through administrative and financial reforms, Matthias Corvinus increased royal revenues, strengthened monarchial power, and suppressed magnate influence on state governance. Even though the magnate class and the upper nobility retained their traditional power in Hungary, Matthias’s reforms allowed the crown to act independently through royal revenues.

== Administrative Reforms ==
Throughout his reign, Matthias gradually enacted administrative reforms to the benefit of the crown’s treasury. At the time of Matthias’s accession to the throne, the economic wealth and political power of Hungary were largely dominated by a few magnate families. Previously, the voting of the taxation and the treasury was under the influence of the royal/great chancellery and council, which were composed of only the high nobility and the clergy. To circumvent the influence of these “established” classes and attain fiscal independence, Matthias created “minor or secret chancellery” instead of the official great chancellery and filled the positions with lesser nobility and foreigners. One of these appointees was John I Ernuszt, a talented Jewish financier who converted to Catholicism. Such officials and lesser nobility, chosen by merit rather than by family name, remained loyal to Matthias and served as an efficient bureaucracy. Matthias also tried to mitigate the influence of the nobility by leaving many offices of the great chancellery vacant. As Matthias implemented administrative changes, he was able to gain control of the government as well as the judicial system.

== The Reform of 1467 ==
The most important legacy of Matthias in Hungary’s fiscal reform came in 1467. Before Matthias, the Anjou kings of Hungary relied on the royal revenues from the crown monopolies of salt, mining, customs as well as income from their crownlands. Matthias was in a better position than his predecessors, for he retained the royal revenues from specialty products and had the immense fortunes of the Hunyadi family. However, royal income from these sources fell short of the financial needs of the kingdom. Hungary faced constant threat from a much wealthier Ottoman Empire, and Matthias embarked on military expeditions to the north which required large sums of payment to the mercenaries.

In Marth 1467, Matthias summoned the Hungarian diet in Buda to pass several of his tax reforms. The existing chamber’s profit (lucrum camerae) dating back to 1336 was replaced and renamed as the taxes of the treasury (tributum fisci regalis). This had a two-sided effect, both of which contributed to the massive increase in the royal revenue. The previous chamber’s profit was collected on a “gate” or porta basis, with “gate” defined as “every gate through which a cart loaded with wheat or hay may enter or pass out.” Regardless of the number of families behind each gate, the tax was levied per gate. The renamed taxes of the treasury changed the tax-collection unit into per household, effectively increasing the tax revenue. Another effect of the renaming of the tax was the abolition of existing immunities and exemptions. Under the previous lucrum camerae, many regions, cities, and households were exempt from the tax duties. Their duties were revived once the tax was renamed. Matthias also renamed the “thirtieth” customs duty as vectigal coronae, or duty of the crown. Like the taxes of the treasury, the renaming of the customs duty removed existing tax exemptions and allowed the royal officials to collect them more rigorously. Transylvania in particular used to enjoy the benefits of the tax exemption granted by the previous kings. With tax duties reimposed, Transylvania responded with a rebellion in the same year. The rebellion, however, was quickly suppressed by Matthias.

== Extraordinary Taxes ==
While these systematic reforms substantially increased the royal revenue, the most significant source of income came from the extraordinary taxes imposed on the peasants. The extraordinary tax was imposed on a porta basis, with every porta contributing to around one florin a year. Over the course of 32 years, such extraordinary taxes were levied 43 times. While the extraordinary tax was collected in combination with the chamber’s profit, the amount was substantial especially in years where the extraordinary taxes were levied more than once. Some of it came from free royal cities, but most of it came from the peasantry. Matthias was able to convince the diet to pass the extraordinary taxes with support from the gentry and the lesser nobility. Even when Matthias was unable to convince the diet, he would impose the extraordinary tax through the royal chancellery. Many of the lesser nobility saw attendance at the diet as a financial burden since they did not have the economic power like the magnates. For their convenience, they agreed to Matthias’s proposal and even agreed to the taxes several years in advance. Although Matthias at times had to grant noble rights in exchange for the levying of the extraordinary tax, he tactfully managed the noble diet during his reign. Most of the tax burden, as a result, fell to the peasantry.

== Tax from the Jewish Community ==
One characteristic of the economic reforms of Matthias Corvinus was that it included a special measure to extract revenue from the Jewish community in Hungary. Jews in Europe were often used as a scapegoat and widely persecuted. Their role as moneylenders made them unpopular, and some Catholic monarchies (most notably, Spain) even expelled Jews from their territory. The states in Eastern Europe were more accepting of the Jewish community, especially in Poland and Hungary. Matthias saw the Jewish community in Hungary as a potential source of exclusive royal income. He installed the office of “Jewish Prefect” in 1476, with a dedicated militia to enforce his rule to the Jewish people in Hungary. This placed the Jewish communities under the direct control of the crown, and consequently, their tax revenue was directed to the royal treasury. The tax revenue collected from the Jewish community increased from 4,000 florins to 20,000 during Matthias’s reign.

== The Result of the Reform ==
Combined with administrative reforms that centralized tax collection and placed competent treasurers in control of the royal income, Matthias’s fiscal reforms resulted in great success. Under the management of John Ernuszt and his son, Sigismund, the royal revenue gradually grew almost fivefold. At the time of Matthias’s accession, the annual royal revenue was around 200,000 to 250,000 florins. This grew into almost one million florins at the end of Matthias’s reign. This placed Hungary’s royal revenue roughly at the same level as that of France and Burgundy. While this amount does not compare to the Ottoman Empire’s annual income of 1.8 million florins, it brought unprecedented fiscal prowess to the Hungarian throne. In addition to the annual income, Matthias received reparations and tributes from time to time through his military conquests. Matthias’s power came from a strong standing army, known as the Black Army. At its peak, the Black Army reached 28,000 men, mostly composed of mercenaries paid by the crown. The maintenance of such a large standing army was only made possible by the economic reforms Matthias enacted earlier in his reign.
