= Abony =

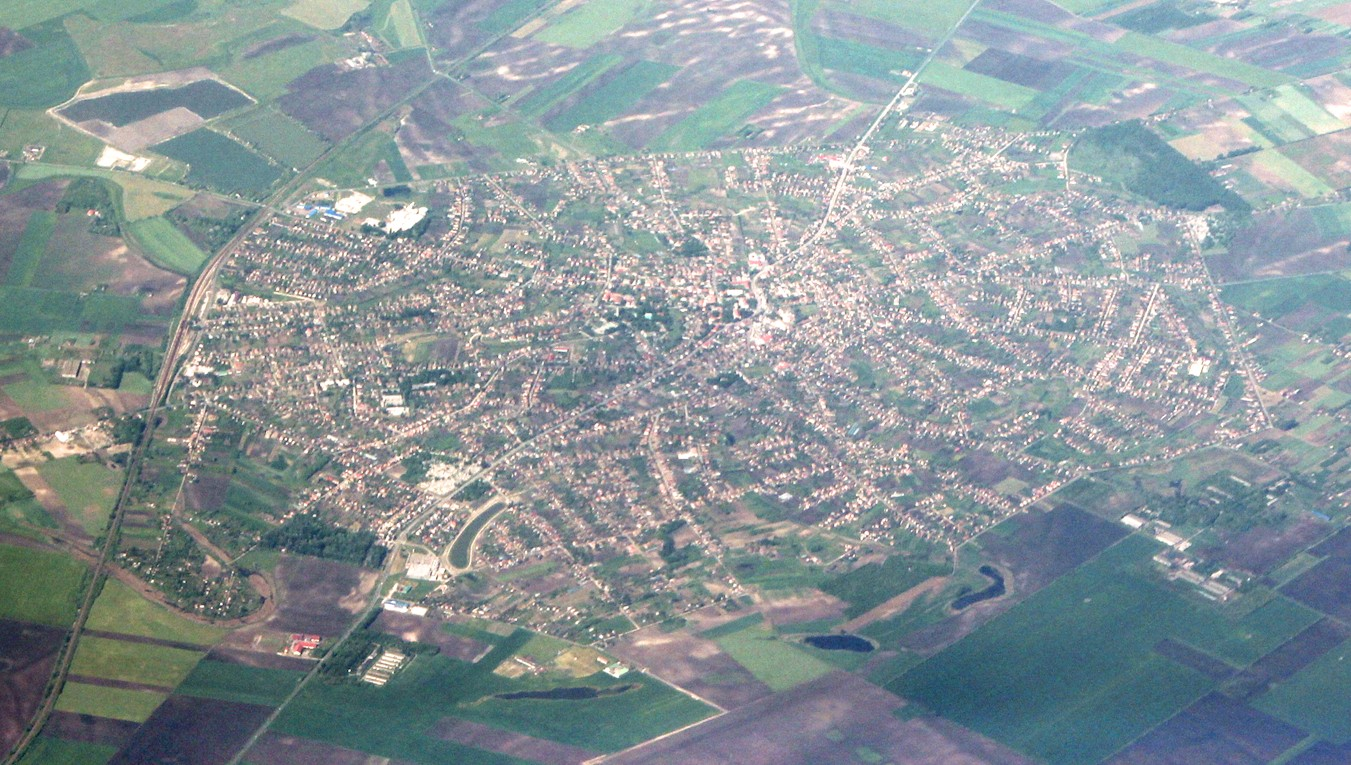
- Aerial view

- Flag Coat of arms

- Location of Abony in Hungary
- Coordinates: 47.18944°N 20.00969°E
- Country: Hungary
- Region: Central Hungary
- County: Pest
- Subregion: Cegléd

Area
  - Total: 127.97 km^{2} (49.41 sq mi)
- Highest elevation: 100 m (330 ft)
- Lowest elevation: 90 m (300 ft)

Population (2008)
  - Total: 15,681
  - Density: 122.54/km^{2} (317.37/sq mi)
- Time zone: UTC+1 (CET)
  - Summer (DST): UTC+2 (CEST)
- Postal code: 2740
- Area code: +36 53
- KSH code: 27872
- Website: www.abony.hu

Abony (German: Wabing) is a town in Pest County, Hungary.

== Geography ==
Abony is a town in the south-east of Pest County, between the Danube and Tisza rivers. It is 16 km (10 mi) from Cegléd and 85 km (53 mi) from Budapest, at an elevation of 90 to 100 m (300 to 330 ft). The area is on the River Tisza's wide floodplain which approximates 13,000 hectares (32,000 acres). Its rich black soil contains some sand.

== Name ==
The name of the town developed from the diminutive form of the name Aba, which is of Turkic origin. It was attested as Abon in 1466.

== History ==
- There are some archaeological finds from the 7th and 8th centuries.
- The village was part of the shire county of Szolnok in the 13th century.
- The first known record of the village is in 1450 as Aban.
- In 1474, Balázs Magyar, his daughter Benigna Magyar and later her husband Pál Kinizsi owned the land.
- In 1515, István Werbőczy was given the village as a donation.
- In 1552, it came under Turkish rule, and during the next century it suffered almost complete destruction.
- At the beginning of the 18th century, the village's population was growing, and in 1748 became a small town.
- On 25 January 1849, Mór Perczel led the Hungarian troops to win near Abony as part of the Hungarian War of Independence.

=== The Jewish community ===
Jews lived in the city from the 18th century. The synagogue was established in 1756, and in 1788 the Jewish school was founded. In 1840, 912 Jews lived in the city. In May 1944, a ghetto was established by order of the German army, where the Jews of the city and the surrounding area were concentrated. In June, ghetto Jews were deported in two transports to the Auschwitz extermination camp.

== In literature ==
On 12 June 1847 Sándor Petőfi spent a night in the village pub on his way from Nagyszalonta (where he visited János Arany) to Budapest. It is mentioned it in his Journey letters.

Lajos Abonyi, a writer who lived in Abony, recorded a famous folk-song "In Nagyabony there are only two towers" from Zoltán Kodály's Braggadocio. In the song Nagyabony means this village. There is another Nagyabony in Slovakia, called in Slovak Veľké Blahovo. The song's tune is from Upper Hungary.

== Economy ==
The local economy is mainly based on agriculture: most people are crop farmers, but some grow grapes and fruit.

== Landmarks ==
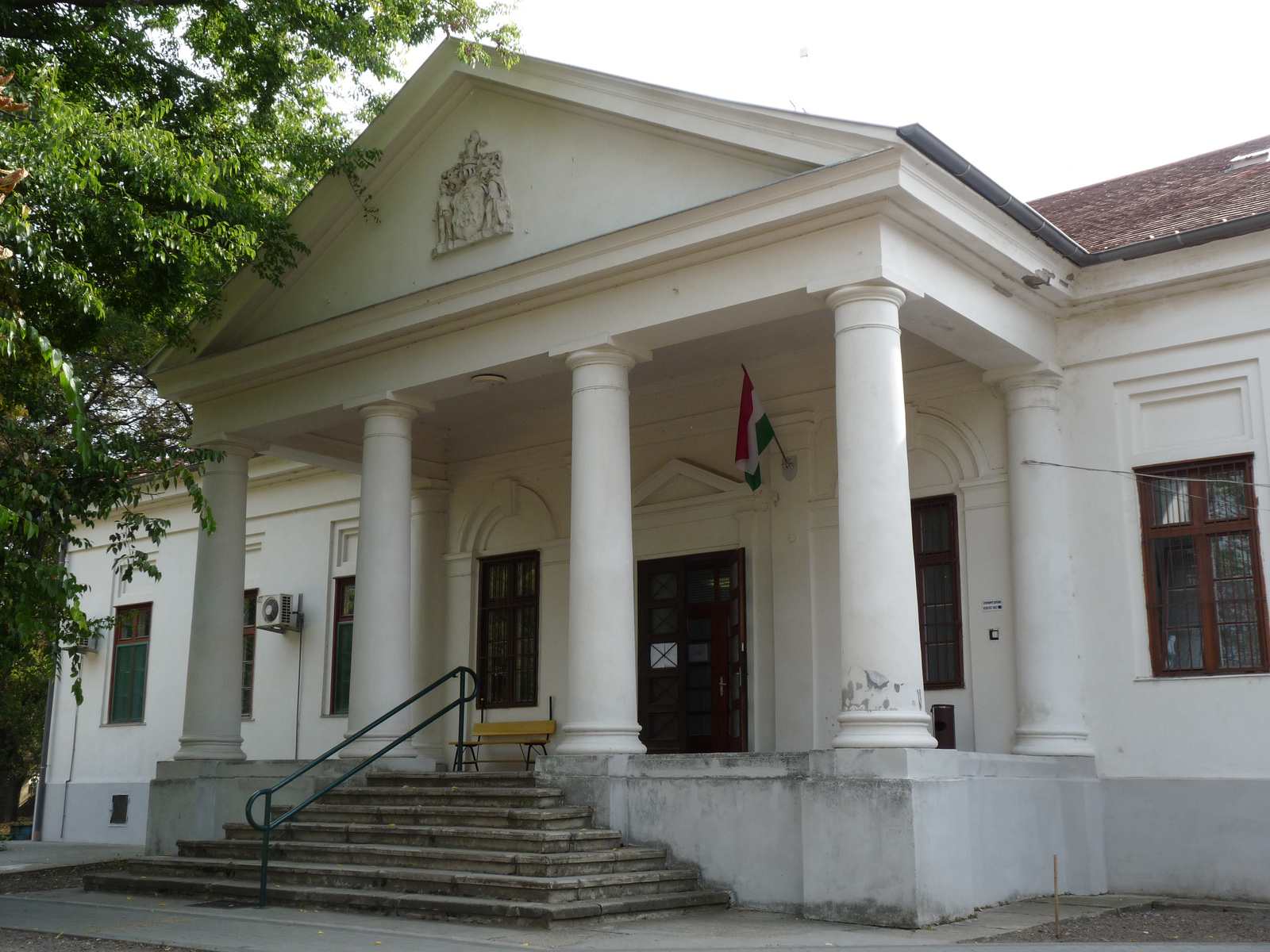
Mansion in Abony

- Lajos Abonyi Folk Museum and granary
- Harkányi Castle
- Synagogue
- Roman Catholic church
- United Reformed Church
- Talián family mausoleum
- Family seats: Kostyán, Lavatka, Szapáry, Kisvigyázó (castle), Vigyázó, Ajtay, Sivó, Teszáry

== Famous people ==
- János Varga, (1939 – 2022 ), Olympic champion wrestler.
- Gyula Háy (1900 – 1975), dramatist and poet.
- Artúr Balogh (1866 – 1951), Hungarian lawyer, university professor, politician, and member of the Hungarian Academy of Sciences.
- László Endre (1895 - 1946), politician and Nazi collaborator
- Zoltán Mucsi (b. 1957 - ), actor
- László Földi (b. 1952 – ), politician
- Norbert Kállai (b. 1984 – ), footballer

== International relations ==
=== Twin towns — sister cities ===
Abony is twinned with:

- Reci (Hungarian Réty), Romania
