= Battle of Bonefield =

1490 battle between John Corvinus and the Kingdom of Hungary

Date	4 July 1490
Location	Kölesd, Tolna County
Result	Victory of the party of Beatrice of Naples

Commanders and leaders
Duke John Corvinus; Lawrence of Ilok; Bishop Sigismund Ernuszt	Stephen V Báthory; Pál Kinizsi; Bartolomeu Dragfi

Strength
7,000 men	6,000–7,000 men

The Battle of Bonefield (Hungarian: Csontmezei csata) in other sources Battle of Bone Hill (Hungarian: Csonthegyi csata) was fought between the army of John Corvinus and an army of the Kingdom of Hungary (the party of queen Beatrice of Naples) under Pál Kinizsi and Stephen V Báthory after the death of Matthias Corvinus king of Hungary, on 4 July 1490, in the Bonefield, a part of Tolna county near the extinct village Szabaton (nowadays Kölesd in Hungary.

== Background ==
King Matthias never had children from his legal marriages. Because of this, he wanted his illegitimate son, John Corvinus, to inherit the kingdom. After his father's death, Hungarian rule quickly collapsed in the Habsburg lands (Styria, Carniola, Lower Austria). The Bohemians (Vladislaus Jagiellon), Poles (John I Albert) and the Holy Roman Emperor Maximilian I also claimed the Hungarian throne. Due to the foreign wars of Matthias in Austria and Bohemia and his extraordinary taxes, the lords, including Kinizsi, did not support his son.

== The battle ==
The 17-year-old John did not inherit his father's brilliant talent. His stepmother Beatrice was also against him. Báthory and Kinizsi, Matthias's great generals, also supported the queen. John was supported only by two ecclesiastical dignitaries and two lords.

John was on 13 July 1490 induced formally to resign his claims to the throne, on the understanding that he was to be compensated with the royal title of Kingdom of Bosnia and title of Ban of Croatia. Some days later John's supporters, Sigismund Ernuszt bishop of Pécs, Lawrence of Ilok and Bertalan Beriszló recruited an army and entered Buda. John changed his mind, but did not stay in the capital. His supporters suggested John that he march to the Southern land and fill your own army with other supporters of the Corvin-party. John also took with him the stock of the king's treasury.

Báthory and Kinizsi immediately pursued John's army. Their troops catch up John's forces in Tolna county. During that time, John hesitated and wanted to return to the capital, but his supporters blackmailed him and forced him to fight the battle with Kinizsi and Báthory.

The troops of Kinizsi and Báthory (6–7 thousands men) discovered John's army (7000 men) by the river Sárvíz on the Bonefield (Csontmező). John's troops tried to initiate on the battlefield, but the inexperienced peasant soldiers were easily repulsed by the experienced troops of Kinizsi and Báthory.

Lawrence of Ilok rescued John from the battle. The enemy no longer pursued them, but he was busy robbing the vagons.

== Aftermath ==
After the losing battle John lost all chance of getting the throne of Hungary. He was also recognized as duke of Slavonia and Opava, but compelled to relinquish both titles five years later. In 1498 he was created perpetual Ban of Croatia and Slavonia.

== Sources ==
- Corvin János vereséget szenved a csontmezei csatában – Rubicon Online (Hungarian)
- Az apa árnyékában: az ismeretlen Corvin János – Magyar Nemzet (Hungarian)
