= Ernuszt family =

House of Ernuszt Ernušt
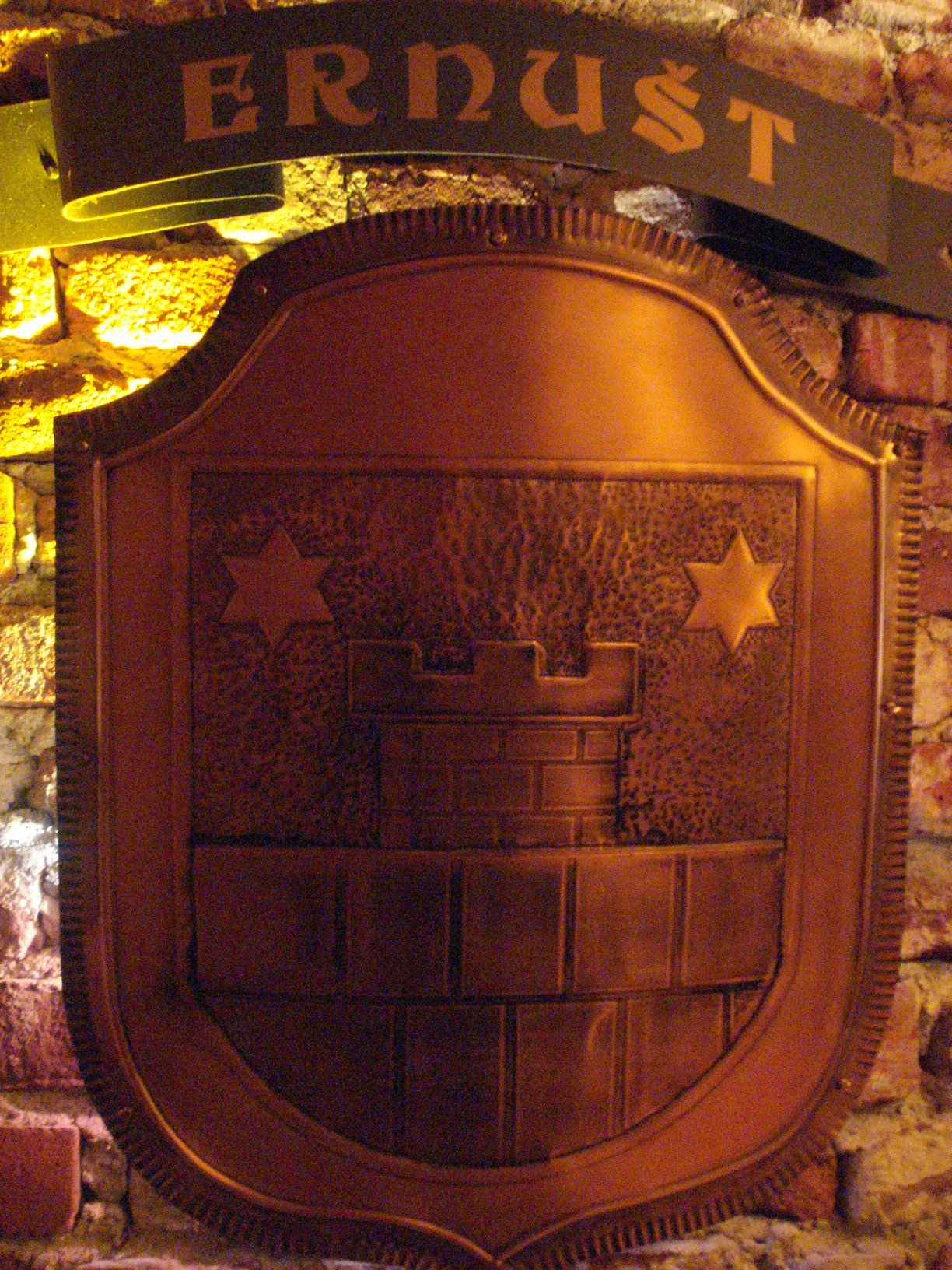
- Country: Kingdom of Hungary; Kingdom of Croatia in personal union with Hungary
- Founded: 1460s
- Founder: John I
- Final ruler: Caspar
- Titles: Bans (viceroys) of Croatia, bans of Slavonia, royal chamberlains, bishops, ispáns, župans (counts) etc.
- Estates: Međimurje, Đurđevac, Koprivnica, Virje, Molve etc.
- Dissolution: 1540

The House of Ernuszt (English: Ernusht; Croatian: Ernušt) was a Hungarian noble family, descending from a rich Jewish family who came to medieval Hungary from Vienna, converted to Catholicism and also reached its peak in the Kingdom of Croatia during the reign of King Matthias Corvinus and his successors. Notable members of the family were bans of Croatia and Slavonia, king's chamberlains, bishops, ispáns, župans (counts) and other state officials.

== Family history ==
At the beginning of the reign of King Matthias Corvinus (1458-1490), Ernuszts were wholesalers and bankers in Buda. John I Ernuszt, nicknamed „Hampó", became king's regular banker and increased his wealth by lucrative and profitable business with the sovereign. For his banking services he earned many titles and estates as well, either buying the land from the king or receiving it as mortgage for money lent to him. On 20 November 1473 he was appointed Ban of Slavonia, receiving at the same time Međimurje County, the northernmost part of the territory, with its seat Čakovec. Therefore, he appeared in historical documents as John Ernuszt de Csáktornya (Hungarian: csáktornyai Ernuszt János; Croatian: Ivan Ernušt Čakovečki).

After his death on 3 March 1476, he was succeeded by his sons John II and Sigismund. While the latter became Bishop of Pécs, (1473–1505), the former stayed in his father's main Međimurje estate and served (1507–1510), together with George Kanizsai, as Ban of Croatia. In the meantime, brothers earned some additional estates, among which were Đurđevac and Molve (in 1477).

Francis Ernuszt, the son of John II, inherited all of the family possessions after his father's death in 1519. He was known for his participation in the Battle of Mohács on 29 August 1526, where he was among many Hungarian and Croatian nobles who lost their lives. He left two sons, John III and Caspar. The former died in 1537 leaving no children, and the latter was married to Ana, a daughter of Petar Keglević, Ban of Croatia.

Caspar took part in many battles against the Ottomans, leading his banderium, a kind of military unit, and even counter-attacked the enemy in already occupied parts of Croatia and Slavonia. Nevertheless, Ottoman numerical superiority was decisive and Croats were forced to retreat more and more to the west and northwest. One of the ways used for population to flee lead through the Caspar's Međimurje County. He himself helped people by setting ferries on the Drava and Mura river which enabled the refugees to cross them and go further north to reach western Hungary, which was still not occupied.

Since Caspar died in 1540 without issue, his family died out. His widow Anna attempted to retain all his possessions, even engaging her father's military crew, but King Ferdinand I Habsburg did not allow it. In the name of the king, Nikola Šubić Zrinski, the new Ban of Croatia, pushed the Keglevićs out of Međimurje by force.

== Notable members of the family ==
- John I, died 1476, Ban of Slavonia (1473-1476)
- John II, died 1528, Ban of Croatia (1507–1510)
- Sigismund, died 1505, Bishop of Pécs (1473–1505)
- Francis, killed in the battle of Mohács (1526)
- Caspar, died 1540

== See also ==
- History of Croatia
- Croatia in personal union with Hungary
- Ban of Croatia
- Ban of Slavonia
- Čakovec Castle

== Bibliography ==
- Kalšan, Vladimir (2006). Židovi u Međimurju. Čakovec: Muzej Međimurja Čakovec. ISBN 953-6896-12-5.

== Sources ==
- Horvat, Rudolf, PhD: Poviest Međimurja (History of Medjimurje), edited by „Prosvjetno-poviestno družtvo Hrvatski rodoljub", Zagreb, 1944, and reprinted by „Matica hrvatska – Ogranak Čakovec" (Matrix Croatica – Čakovec Branch), Čakovec, 1993
