= Kamičak Castle =

- Krka National Park, (near Brištane, Town of Drniš), Šibenik-Knin County, Croatia
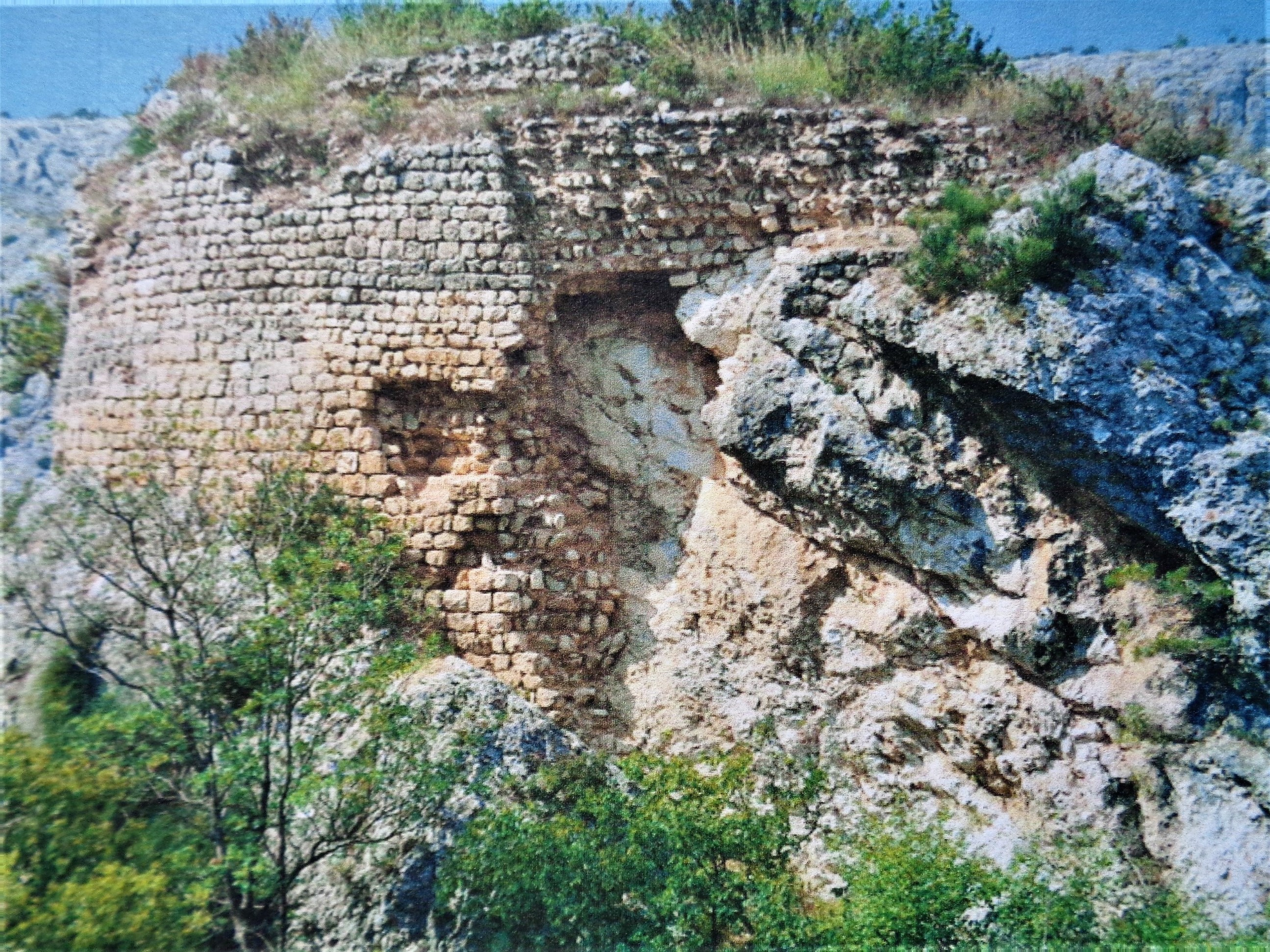
- Steep rock with remains of the former castle

Site information
- Type: Hilltop castle
- Controlled by: Nelipić noble family (until 1435), (1435–1445), Utješinović noble family (1445–~1490); Halapić noble family (~1490–1522/3)
- Condition: ruins

Location
- Location within Croatia
- Coordinates: 43.880000°N 15.980000°E

Site history
- Built: 14th century (?)
- Built by: Ivan Nelipčić (?)
- Materials: hewn stone (ashlar)

Kamičak Castle ([Kamichak]; Croatian: Utvrda Kamičak, in old sources Kamichech, Kamichach, Kamichack, Camichach) is a ruined medieval fortified structure on a rock at the top of the hill above the Krka River in the Krka National Park, Croatia. It is situated not far from the Brištane village in the administrative area of the Town of Drniš, Šibenik-Knin County. Located between the Visovac Lake and Roški Slap waterfall, it perks up like an eagle in unreachable eagle's nest on the edge of a cliff. Once property of the powerful Nelipić noble family, the castle was captured and destroyed in 1522/23 by the Ottoman invaders, never to be rebuilt.

== History ==
Kamičak was first mentioned in 1345 in a document issued by the Croato-Hungarian king Louis I of Anjou to confirm the property of the castle to Ivan II Nelipić, whose family possessed it at least from the 11th century. According to oral tradition, it is assumed that Petar Snačić, the last king of the independent Kingdom of Croatia, killed in the battle of Gvozd Mountain in 1097, was born in Kamičak, since the Nelipić family descended from the Snačić tribe. The last male member of the Nelipić family was Ivaniš (†1434), who gave the castle to his son-in-law Ivan VI Anž Frankopan. The king Sigismund of Luxemburg however did not recognize it and gave the castle to Talovac noble family.

In 1445 Kamičak was given to Grgur/Gregory Utješinović, who donated the island of Visovac to the members of Franciscan Province of Bosna Srebrena. His son, the influential Cardinal Juraj/George Utješinović was born in the castle in 1482. That is why the local people until today call Kamičak the „Castle of Utješinović“ or „Town of Utješinović“ (Utješinovića grad). There are some other people who originate from Kamičak area, for instance Marko Mišljenović, Ban (Viceroy) of Croatia, who ruled 1506–1507.

A couple of years later, the castle belonged to the Halapić brothers, who were present at the election of Croato-Hungarian king Vladislaus II Jagelović in 1490.

After conquering Kingdom of Bosnia in 1463, the Ottoman forces increased pressure on Croatian borders all the time, which lead to fall of Kamičak in 1522/1523. The ruined castle had no importance for the Turks and was abandoned, never to be rebuilt.

== See also ==
- List of castles in Croatia
- Timeline of Croatian history
- Military history of Croatia
- House of Nelipić
