= Kamičak =

Kamičak Камичак
- Village
- Location within Bosnia and Herzegovina
- Coordinates: 44°39′50″N 16°46′20″E
- Country: Bosnia and Herzegovina
- Entity: Federation of Bosnia and Herzegovina
- Canton: Una-Sana
- Municipality: Ključ

Area
  - Total: 2.41 sq mi (6.23 km^{2})

Population (2013)
  - Total: 902
  - Density: 375/sq mi (145/km^{2})
- Time zone: UTC+1 (CET)
  - Summer (DST): UTC+2 (CEST)

Kamičak (Serbian Cyrillic: Камичак, lit. "Littlestone Village") is a village in the municipality of Ključ, Bosnia and Herzegovina.

It is located between the towns of Ključ and Sanski Most in the northwest of Bosnia. The village is made of two parts Gornji Kamičak (Upper Littlestone) and Donji Kamičak (Lower Littlestone). Gorgeous River Sana flows through the village, a tributary of River Una (known as Beauty of Krajina region).

Kamičak is mainly known by its Old Ottoman Castle located in one of its hamlets of Stari Grad (Old Town) and the beautiful banks, cliffs and fly fishing in the Sana River.

== Demographics ==
According to the 2013 census, its population was 902.

Ethnicity in 2013
Ethnicity	Number	Percentage
Bosniaks	896	99.3%
other/undeclared	6	0.7%
Total	902	100%
