= Blaise Magyar =

Hungarian military officer

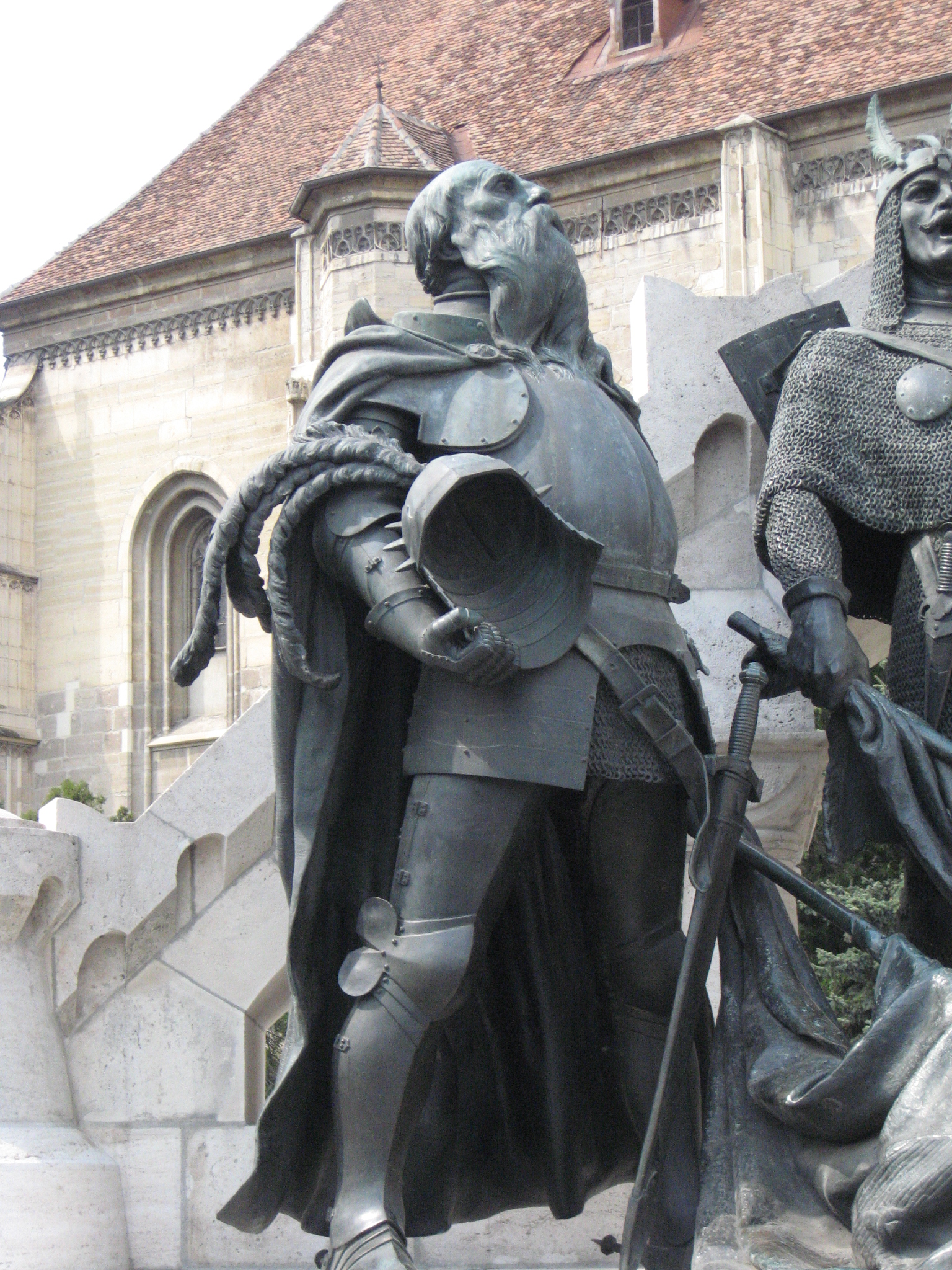
Blaise Magyar (Matthias Corvinus Monument)

Blaise Magyar (Hungarian: Magyar Balázs), also Blaž the Magyar, was a military commander and officer of state in the Kingdom of Hungary in the 15th century. His military career started under the command of John Hunyadi. In the reign of John Hunyadi's son, Matthias Corvinus, he served as Ban of Croatia from 1470 to 1472 and in 1483, Ban of Slavonia from 1470 and 1471 and in 1483, Ban of Bosnia from 1470 to 1471, and Voivode of Transylvania from 1472 and 1475. He died in Kassa (now Košice in Slovakia) in 1490.

== Sources ==
- Fine, John V. A. (1994) [1987]. The Late Medieval Balkans: A Critical Survey from the Late Twelfth Century to the Ottoman Conquest. Ann Arbor, Michigan: University of Michigan Press. ISBN 978-0-472-10079-8.
- Markó, László (2006). A magyar állam főméltóságai Szent Istvántól napjainkig: Életrajzi Lexikon [Great Officers of State in Hungary from King Saint Stephen to Our Days: A Biographical Encyclopedia] (in Hungarian). Helikon Kiadó. ISBN 963-547-085-1.
- Kubinyi, András (2008). Matthias Rex. Balassi Kiadó. ISBN 978-963-506-767-1.
