= Mojš =

Village and municipality in Slovakia

- Municipality
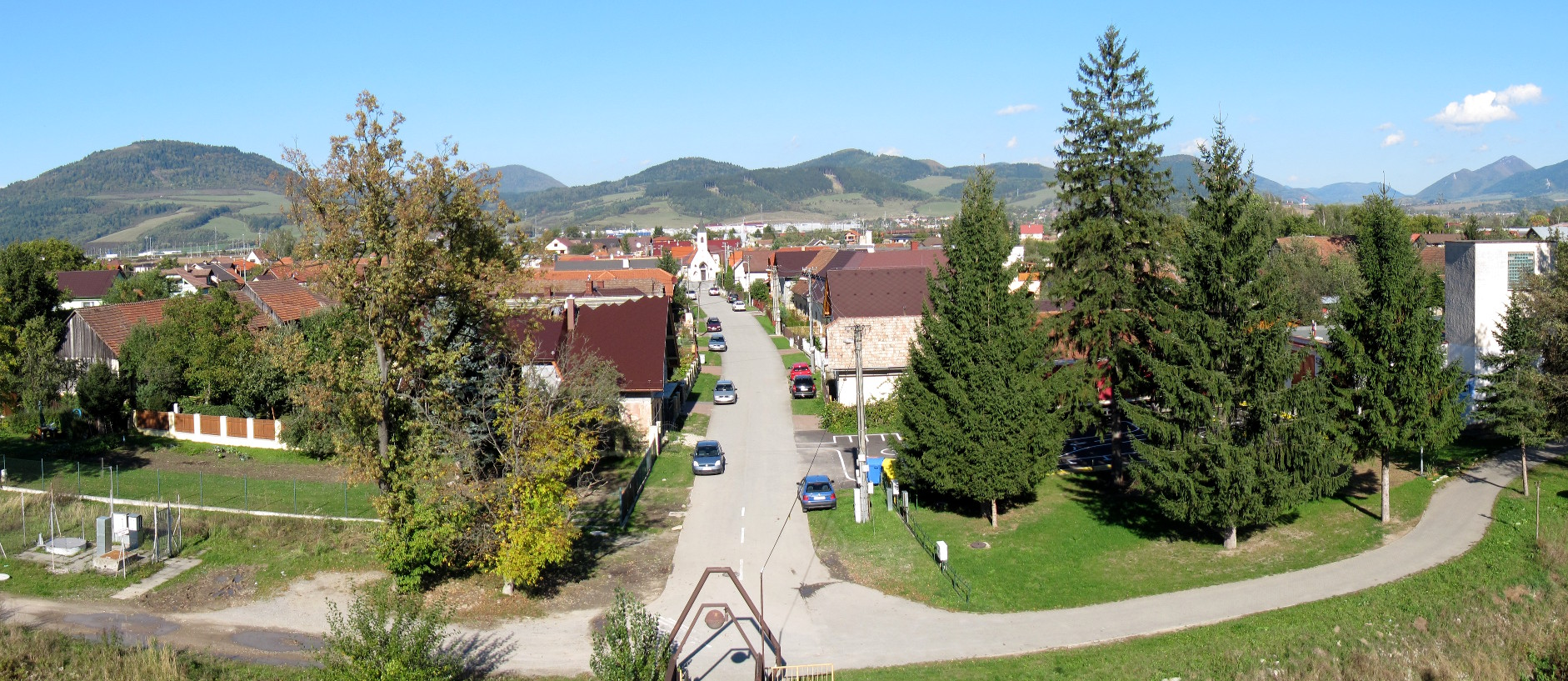

- Flag

- Location of Mojš in the Žilina Region Location of Mojš in Slovakia
- Coordinates: 49.20°N 18.82°E
- Country: Slovakia
- Region: Žilina Region
- District: Žilina District
- First mentioned: 1419

Area
  - Total: 2.59 km^{2} (1.00 sq mi)
- Elevation: 346 m (1,135 ft)

Population (2025)
  - Total: 1,515
- Time zone: UTC+1 (CET)
  - Summer (DST): UTC+2 (CEST)
- Postal code: 100 1
- Area code: +421 41
- Vehicle registration plate (until 2022): ZA
- Website: www.mojs.sk

Mojš (Hungarian: Majosfalva) is a village and municipality in Žilina District in the Žilina Region of northern Slovakia.

== History ==
In historical records the village was first mentioned in 1419.

== Geography ==
The municipality lies at an altitude of 346 metres (1,135 ft) and covers an area of 2.59 km^{2} (1.00 sq mi) (2025).

== Population ==
Population statistic (10 years)
Year	1995	2005	2015	2025
Count	499	454	985	1515
Difference		−9.01%	+116.96%	+53.80%

Population statistic
Year	2024	2025
Count	1496	1515
Difference		+1.27%

It has a population of 1515 people (31 December 2025).

=== Ethnicity ===
Census 2021 (1+ %)
Ethnicity	Number	Fraction
Slovak	1264	96.41%
Not found out	47	3.58%
Total	1311	

In year 2021 was 1311 people by ethnicity 1264 as Slovak, 47 as Not found out, 12 as Czech, 4 as Hungarian, 3 as Other, 2 as Rusyn, 2 as Russian, 1 as Jewish, 1 as Ukrainian, 1 as Turkish, 1 as Serbian, 1 as Silesian, 1 as Polish, 1 as German, 1 as Moravian and 1 as French.

Note on population: The difference values of population numbers in the table "Population statistic" and in the sections "Ethnicity" & "Religion" is caused by the use of various statistical methods.

=== Religion ===
Census 2021 (1+ %)
Religion	Number	Fraction
Roman Catholic Church	907	69.18%
None	312	23.8%
Not found out	43	3.28%
Evangelical Church	15	1.14%
Total	1311	

In year 2021 was 1311 people by religion 907 from Roman Catholic Church, 312 from None, 43 from Not found out, 15 from Evangelical Church, 8 from Greek Catholic Church, 7 from Other, 7 from Ad hoc movements, 6 from Buddhism, 2 from Christian Congregations in Slovakia, 1 from Old Catholic Church, 1 from Calvinist Church, 1 from Eastern Orthodox Church and 1 from Other and not ascertained christian church.
