= Sigismund Ernuszt =

Hungarian Roman Catholic bishop (1445–1505)

- Bishop of Pécs
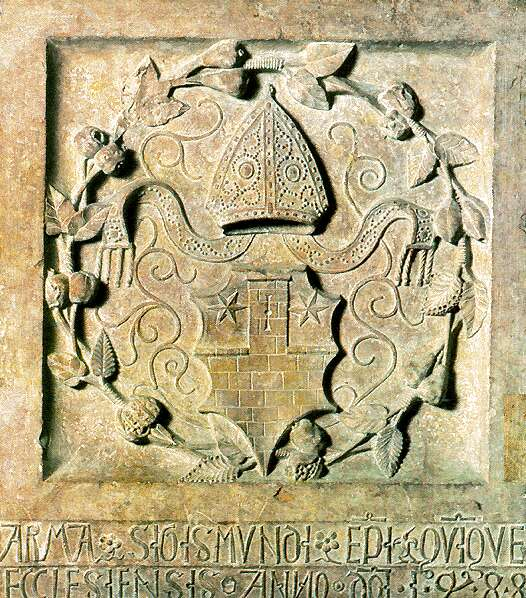
- Coat-of-arms of Sigismund Ernuszt
- Province: Esztergom
- Diocese: Pécs
- Appointed: 1473
- Term ended: 1505
- Predecessor: Janus Pannonius
- Successor: George Szatmári

Personal details
- Born: c. 1445
- Died: summer 1505
- Buried: Pécs
- Denomination: Roman Catholic

Sigismund Ernuszt (Hungarian: csáktornyai Ernuszt Zsigmond; c. 1445;– summer 1505) was Bishop of Pécs in the Kingdom of Hungary from 1473 to 1505. Ernuszt was also Ban of Croatia, Dalmatia and Slavonia from 1494 to 1498. He was the son of John Ernuszt, a converted Jew, who started his career as a custom's duty collector during the reign of Matthias Corvinus, King of Hungary. Sigismund studied at the universities of Vienna and Ferrara in the early 1470s. When the king made him bishop of Pécs, the Holy See confirmed him as the administrator of the diocese, but he was most probably never ordained bishop. Matthias Corvinus also tasked him with the administration of the newly conquered Archduchy of Austria in 1486.

After Matthias's death, he was the only bishop to support the bid of Matthias's illegitimate son, John Corvinus, for the throne. After the united armies of Corvinus's supporters were defeated in the battle of Bonefield, he swore fealty to Vladislaus II Jagiellon. The new king made him royal treasurer in 1494, but he was dismissed after being accused of embezzlement at the Diet of Hungary in 1496. Pécs Cathedral and the castle at Pécs were renovated during his tenure. His three retainers strangled him to seize his wealth.

== Early life ==
Sigismund was the elder son of John Ernuszt (also known as John Hampó) and his wife, Catherine. He was born around 1445. His father was a Jew from Vienna who moved to Buda. He converted to Roman Catholicism by 1457. Ten years later, Matthias Corvinus, King of Hungary, made him royal treasurer.

Sigismund began his studies at the University of Vienna in or shortly before 1470. He was made provost of the Budafelhévíz Chapter around the same time. He studied at the University of Ferrara between 1471 and 1473. One of his professors, Ludovico Carbone, published their conversations about Matthias Corvinus as a literary dialogue. Ernuszt was famed for his erudition among the Renaissance humanist scholars who visited Hungary in the late 15th century.

== Bishop ==
=== Matthias Corvinus' advisor ===
Matthias Corvinus appointed Ernuszt bishop of Pécs in September 1473, although he had not been ordained priest. The king also granted the royal castle in Pécs to him. Three months later, the Holy See made Ernuszt apostolic administrator of the diocese. His father, who died in 1476, urged him in his last will to achieve his ordination, but no documents evidence that he actually received the sacrament. Ernuszt began the renovation of Pécs Cathedral at the request of his dying father. He also fortified his castle at Đurđevac.

The Székesfehérvár Chapter obstructed Ernuszt's canonical visitations to its estates in the Bishopric of Pécs and forbade the local priests from attending the episcopal synods. The chapter emphasized that its estates were exempt from the jurisdiction of all bishops in Hungary, but Ernuszt persuaded the Holy See to strengthen his authority over the parishes in question in 1478. He made one Anton (who was the titular Bishop of Megara) his coadjutor bishop in 1480 to secure the spiritual administration of the Pécs diocese.

Ernuszt was one of Matthias Corvinus' closest advisors. He urged the Holy See to grant the Zebegény Abbey in Baranya County to him in 1483. The king gave him a precious bowl in 1486. In the same year, Ernuszt (who spoke German) was made the captain-general or the deputy of the captain-general of Archduchy of Austria, which had recently been occupied by the king. Ernuszt loaned 1000 gold florins to Matthias's queen, Beatrice of Naples.

=== Vladislaus Jagiellon's opponent ===
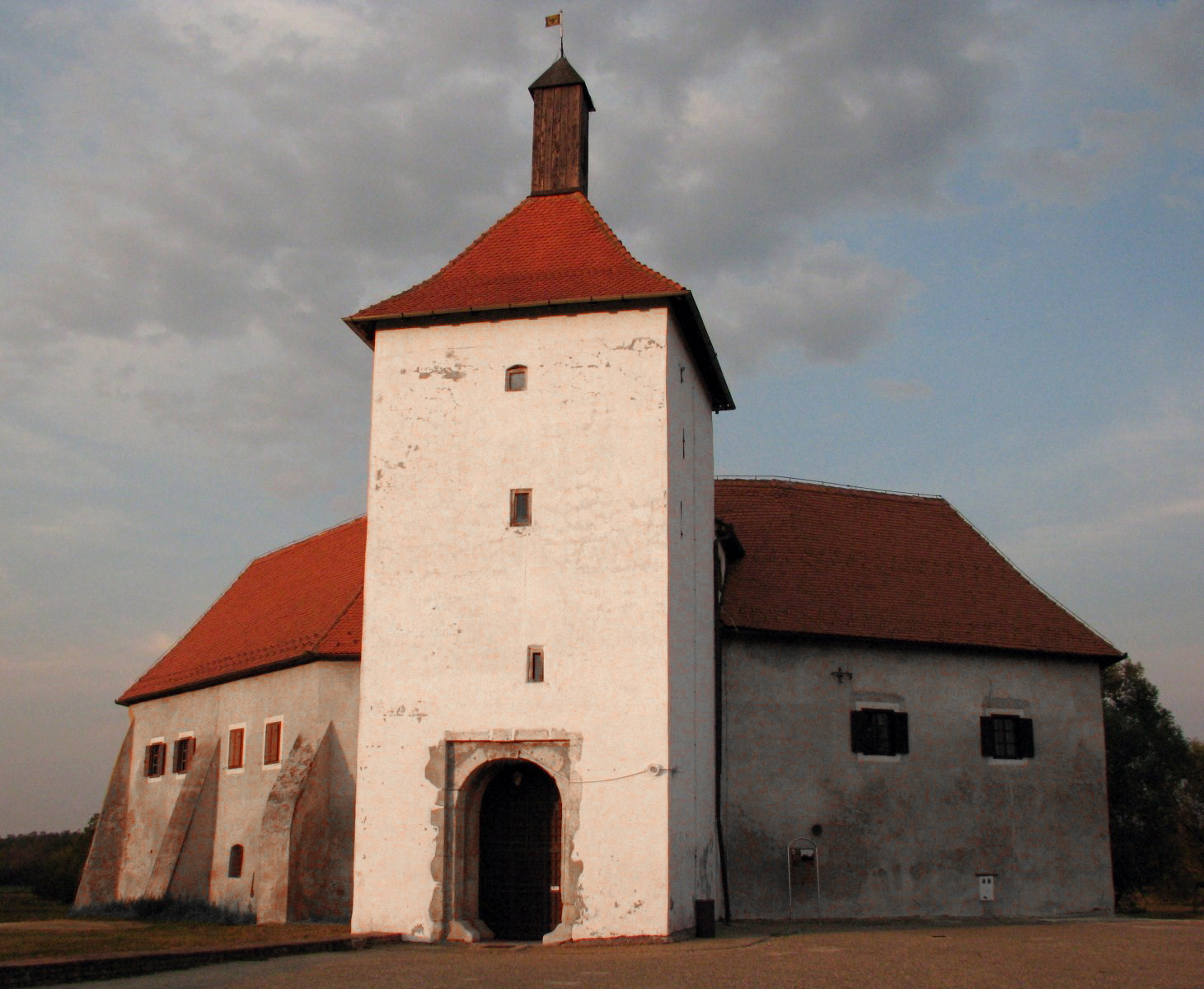
Đurđevac Castle: an important fortress of Sigismund Ernuszt

Matthias Corvinus died on 6 April 1490. Ernuszt seized Pécsvárad Abbey, which had been held by the absent Cardinal Ascanio Sforza, but soon hurried to Buda to attend the Diet which assembled in late May to elect Matthias's successor. He was the only bishop to be willing to support Matthias's illegitimate son, John Corvinus, in his bid for the throne.

Ernuszt soon realized that most barons and prelates preferred Vladislaus Jagiellon, King of Bohemia. To prevent the coronation of Vladislaus, he and Lawrence Újlaki left Buda taking the Holy Crown of Hungary and the royal treasury with them. Đorđe Branković, Nicholas Hédervári, and other barons (mainly those who held estates along the southern borders) joined them. However, Vladislaus's supporters, Stephen Báthory and Paul Kinizsi, assembled their troops and defeated the united armies of Ernuszt and his allies at Gyönk on 4 July.

Ernuszt was forced to return the Holy Crown to the Estates of the realm. He also attended Vladislaus's coronation in Székesfehérvár in September. The new king granted him John Corvinus's two former estates, Futak and Cserög (now Futog and Čerević in Serbia).

Maximilian of Habsburg, who had also laid claim to Hungary after Matthias Corvinus's death, invaded Hungary in November. He borrowed 30,000 gold florins from the wealthy Ernuszt and offered the Archbishopric of Salzburg to him. Ernuszt entered into negotiations with Reinprecht von Reichenburg, the commanders of Maximilian's army in Hungary, but refrained from providing military assistance to him against Vladislaus' troops. Instead, he stayed at Pécs and Đurđevac and came to an agreement with Ladislaus Egervári, Ban of Croatia, over the mutual defense of their estates.

=== In Vladislaus' service ===
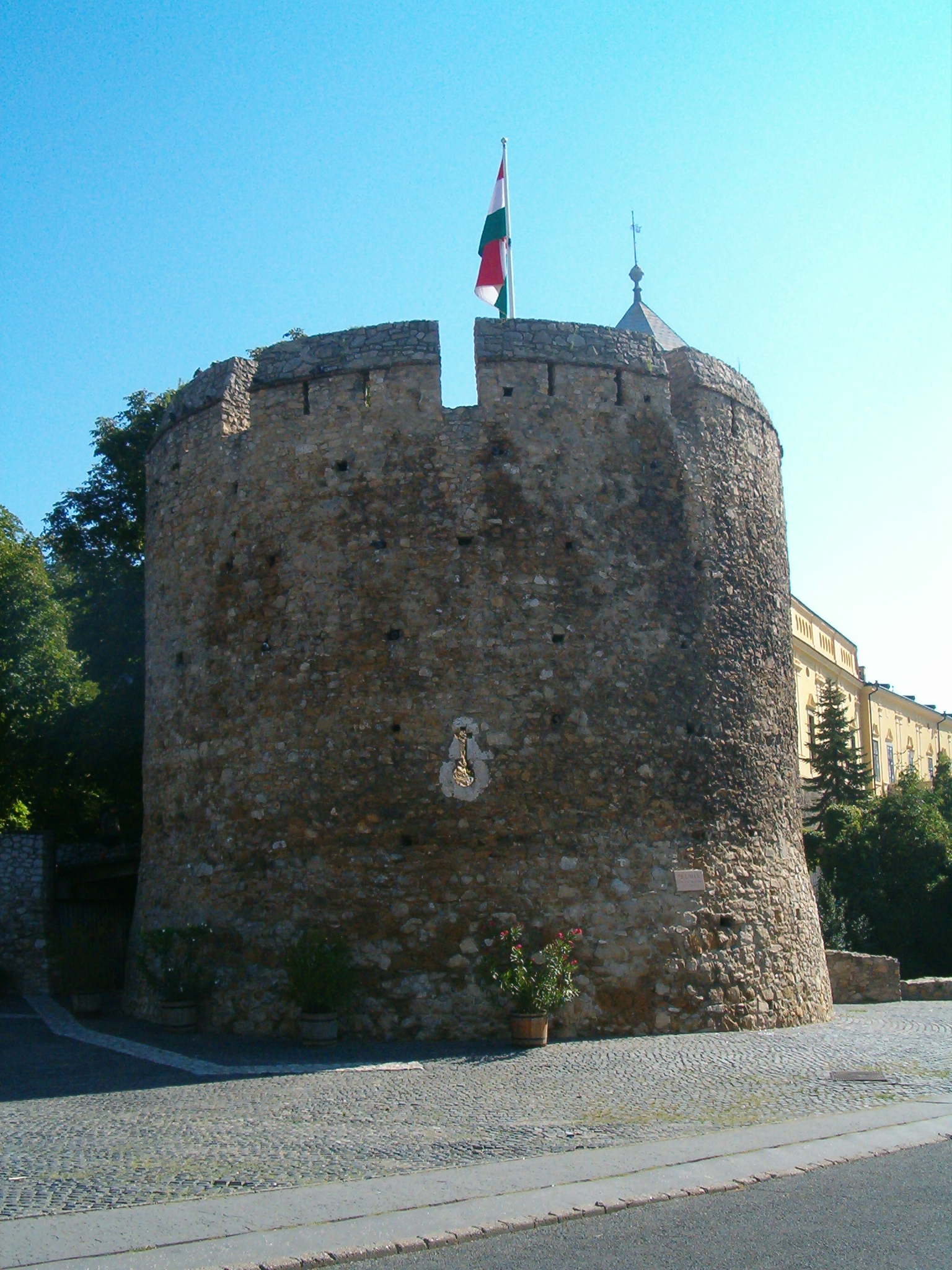
Barbican in Pécs, built at Sigismund Ernuszt's order

Maximilian of Habsburg renounced his claim to Hungary in the Peace of Pressburg on 7 November 1491. Ernuszt was one of the bishops who ratified the peace treaty at the Diet on 7 March 1492. Vladislaus made him royal treasurer in 1494. In the same year, Ernuszt and Ladislaus Kanizsai were jointly appointed Bans of Croatia, Dalmatia and Slavonia.

Ernuszt and his younger brother, John Ernuszt, made several attempts to regain the estates that Matthias Corvinus had confiscated from their father in the early 1470s. They persuaded him to give them their father's former copper mines at Besztercebánya (now Banská Bystrica in Slovakia) in 1494. Soon after, they leased the mines to John and George Thurzó for 10 years. They also regained Szklabonya (Sklabiná in Slovakia) from Anton Poki, a retainer of John Corvinus. The Ernuszt brothers, who held more than 3,500 peasant households, were among the wealthiest landowners in Hungary in 1494.

Ernuszt also rented out the royal copper mines at Besztercebánya to the Thurzós for 12 years on 26 December 1494. The Thurzós and the banker Jakob Fugger established a joint venture, named Ungarischer Handel ("Hungarian Trade"), to exploit the mines. According to Antonio Bonfini, Ernuszt persuaded the king to launch a campaign against Lawrence Újlaki who had captured Futak and Cserög. Újlaki was forced to pay homage to the king at Pécs on 27 March 1495, and to return the two estates to Ernuszt.

At the Diet in 1496, Ernuszt was accused of having embezzled royal tax revenues. The king dismissed him and his deputy, Emeric Dombai, at the demand of the Estates. They were imprisoned at Siklós. He was released only after he paid a large ransom, amounting to 400,000 or 320,000 gold florins, according to Bonfini and Ludovicus Tubero, respectively. Ernuszt remained Ban of Croatia, Dalmatia and Slavonia until 1498 and continued to preserve his seat at the Royal Council. He ordered the renovation and modernization of the castle in Pécs in late 1490. The barbican was built in this period. He sponsored the publication of missals for his priests in 1487 and 1499. He also employed a Pauline monk to copy old codices in his palace.

== Murder ==
Ernuszt was strangled in the summer of 1505 by his three retainers (including Albert Cupi, Dean of Baranya) who wanted to seize his wealth. His brother, John Ernuszt, brought charges against the assassins, but they were never sentenced. Cupi was even employed by Ernuszt's successor, George Szatmári. During the investigation which followed his murder, 300,000 gold florins were found and confiscated for the royal treasury.

== Ernuszt's accounts ==
Ernuszt's accounts of his activity as royal treasurer have been preserved. The accounts cover the period between 1 February 1494 and 31 December 1495. The document is an important source of demographic, economic, and cultural research of late medieval Hungary. The accounts contain a detailed record of the one-florin tax assessed in Hungary proper, Transylvania and Slavonia in 1494 and 1495 which was to be paid by each peasant household. They do not contain data for the fourteen southern counties in Hungary proper, because the ispán (or head) of Temes County, who was responsible for the defence of the southern border, was entitled to spend the royal income from the one-florin tax assessed in this region. The peasants in southern Slavonia were also exempt from the one-florin tax because of the frequent Ottoman raids in this region.

== See also ==
- History of the Jews in Hungary
- Urban Nagylucsei

== Sources ==
- Bartl, Július; Čičaj, Viliam; Kohútova, Mária; Letz, Róbert; Segeš, Vladimír; Škvarna, Dušan (2002). Slovak History: Chronology & Lexicon. Bolchazy-Carducci Publishers, Slovenské Pedegogické Nakladatel'stvo. ISBN 0-86516-444-4.
- Engel, Pál (2001). The Realm of St Stephen: A History of Medieval Hungary, 895–1526. I.B. Tauris Publishers. ISBN 1-86064-061-3.
- Fedeles, Tamás (2010). Püspökök, prépostok, kanonokok: Fejezetek Pécs középkori egyháztörténetéből [Bishops, Provosts, Canons: Chapters from the Medieval Church History of Pécs] (in Hungarian). Szegedi Tudományegyetem Történeti Intézet. ISBN 978-963-482-990-4.
- F. Romhányi, Beatrix (2000). Kolostorok és társaskáptalanok a középkori Magyarországon: Katalógus [Monasteries and Collegiate Chapters in Medieval Hungary: A Catalogue] (in Hungarian). Pytheas. ISBN 963-7483-07-1.
- Kubinyi, András (2008). Matthias Rex. Balassi Kiadó. ISBN 978-963-506-767-1.
- Markó, László (2006). A magyar állam főméltóságai Szent Istvántól napjainkig: Életrajzi Lexikon [Great Officers of State in Hungary from King Saint Stephen to Our Days: A Biographical Encyclopedia] (in Hungarian). Helikon Kiadó. ISBN 963-547-085-1.

Sigismund House of Ernuszt Born: c. 1445 Died: Summer 1505
Catholic Church titles
Preceded by Janus Pannonius	Bishop of Pécs; 1473–1505	Succeeded by George Szatmári
Political offices
Preceded by Lucas Szegedi	Royal treasurer 1494–1496	Succeeded by Sigismund Vémeri
Preceded by Emeric Derencsényi & John Both	Ban of Croatia and Dalmatia alongside Ladislaus Kanizsai (1494–1495) and John Corvinus (1495–1498); 1494–1498	Succeeded by John Corvinus & George Kanizsai
Preceded by Emeric Derencsényi & John Both	Ban of Slavonia alongside Ladislaus Kanizsai (1494–1495) and George Kanizsai (1497–1498); 1494–1498	Succeeded by John Corvinus
