= Tiszakürt =

- Village
- Coat of arms

- Location within Hungary
- Coordinates: 46°53′05″N 20°07′34″E
- Country: Hungary
- County: Jász-Nagykun-Szolnok
- District: Kunszentmárton

Area
  - Total: 28.37 km^{2} (10.95 sq mi)

Population (2023)
  - Total: 1,231
  - Density: 49.9/km^{2} (129/sq mi)
- Time zone: UTC+1 (CET)
  - Summer (DST): UTC+2 (CEST)
- Postal code: 5471
- Area code(s): (+36) 56

Tiszakürt is a village in Jász-Nagykun-Szolnok county, in the Northern Great Plain region of central Hungary.

== Geography ==
It covers an area of 28.37 km^{2} (11 sq mi) and has a population of 1231 people (2023).

Ethnic affiliation of the population of the locality in 2001: Hungarian: 95,1%; Gipsy, Romany: 0,4%; unknown, did not wish to answer: 4,7%

Religious denomination of the population of the locality in 2001: Roman Catholic: 41,0%; Greek Catholic: 0,4%; Calvinist: 29,9%; Lutheran: 0,3%; belonging to other church/denomination: 0,3%; does not belong to any church/denomination: 18,5%; unknown, did not wish to answer: 9,6%

== Attractions ==
- Bolza Mansion
- The Reformed Church was built in 1887, an eclectic style.
- Roman Catholic Church.
- Local History Museum of Tiszakürt
- Granary Building.
- World War I Memorial.
- World War II Memorial.

== Census data ==
Date	Number of		Area (in km2)
	Resident population	dwellings	
1990.01.01 (census)	1687	752	28.48
1991.01.01	1653	750	28.48
1992.01.01	1631	751	28.48
1993.01.01	1615	751	28.48
1994.01.01	1595	753	28.48
1995.01.01	1631	754	28.48
1996.01.01	1628	757	28.48
1997.01.01	1594	759	28.48
1998.01.01	1596	760	28.48
1999.01.01	1620	760	28.48
2000.01.01	1618	760	28.48
2001.02.01 (census)	1606	790	28.48
2002.01.01	1594	788	28.48
2003.01.01	1605	788	28.37
2004.01.01	1581	787	28.37
2005.01.01	1580	785	28.37
2006.01.01	1571	784	28.37
2007.01.01	1544	784	28.37
2008.01.01	1511	784	28.37
2009.01.01	1463	783	28.37
2010.01.01	1414	781	28.37
2011.01.01	1372	779	28.37
