= Katalin Bánffy =

Katalin Bánffy de Alsólindva (Hungarian pronunciation: [ˈkɒtɒlin ˈbaːnfi]) was a 16th-century Hungarian noblewoman, the wife of general and politician Ferenc Batthyány.

== Life ==
Katalin Bánffy, a member of the noble Bánffy family of Lendava, was the wife of Ban Ferenc Batthyányi. Her husband spent much of his time away from home at war, or in assembly, and so there was a great exchange of letters between the two. Against the custom of the times, these letters were written mostly in Hungarian. Katalin Bánffy also corresponded in Latin and German with King of Hungary Maximilian II, the widowed Queen Mary, and Catherine de Medici. She was thought to be the wittiest and most refined Hungarian women by her contemporaries. Orsolya Kanizsai was her personal friend.

As her marriage remained childless, Katalin took it on herself to raise the children of other families in the courts of Güssing and Rechnitz. Noble families asked her to take their children under her wing at court. If a girl was preparing for marriage, Katalin planned the wedding feast. She also hand a hand in all the various household work of the court: sewing, embroidering, weaving, and wreath-making. At the request of her husband she also learned how to cast cannonballs.

The gardens of Katalin and her husband were known throughout Europe; they sent fruit to the Low Countries, to the Archbishop of Esztergom, to the Hungarian royal court and to other courts as well. She was a success at fish- and poultry-breeding. She also enjoyed hunting, and was well-versed in medical practices of the era. After the Battle of Mohács, she sheltered many persecuted families.

Her last known letter was written in January 1563. In September of the same year she was present at the coronation of King Maximilian, but she was missing from the wedding of Miklós Zrínyi the following year; presumably she died at this time.

Today her letters are preserved in archives in Körmend, in the National Archives of Hungary, the Austrian State Archives, the Archives of Brussels, and the personal archives of the Erdődy family.

Between 1936 and 1951 the girls' secondary school in Szolnok, Hungary was named after her, and the schools' endowment is still named for her today.

== Sources ==
- Dr. Kurucz György, ed. (1936). "Bánffy Katalin". A szolnoki m. kir. áll. Bánffy Katalin leánygimnázium és liceum VI. évi értesítője az 1935–36. tanévről (in Hungarian). Szolnok: Headmaster of the school. pp. 3–4.
- "Batthyányné Bánffy Kata". Arcképcsarnok (in Hungarian). NyugatiJelen.com. 2009-04-07. Archived from the original on 2022-05-17.
