= Andrew Both de Bajna =

Hungarian nobleman

baron Andrew Both de Bajna (Croatian: Andrija Bot od Bajne, Hungarian: bajnai Both András ; ? – 13 September 1511) was a Hungarian nobleman from the Both family, who served as Ban of Croatia, Slavonia and Dalmatia repeatedly.

He is a member of the Black Army of king Matthias. He won the battle of Fiume (1474). He is quoted in 1483 as főispán (supremus comes) of Ung and Zemplén. He was also count of Zala, governor of the fortress and city of Zagreb (1489), Captain of the cities of Senj and Montigrecensis, of the Medvedgrad, etc.

He is Ban of Croatia from 1487 to 1490, Ban of Croatia, Slavonia and Dalmatia (regnorum Dalm. Croat. et Sclauoniae banus) in 1482, from 1504 to 1507 then again from 1510 to 1511 where he died in fonction.

His brother, John Both de Bajna also acted as ban in 1493. He spoused Anna Csák.
