= John I Ernuszt =

Viennese historical figure

John (I) Ernuszt

Ban of Slavonia
- Reign: 1473–1476
- Predecessor: Damian Horvát
- Successor: Ladislaus Egervári
- Born: c. 1420
- Died: after 3 March 1476
- Noble family: House of Ernuszt
- Spouse: Catherine N
- Issue: Sigismund; John II
- Father: unknown

John Ernuszt, Sr. (Hungarian: csáktornyai Ernuszt János; died after 3 March 1476) was Ban of Slavonia from 1473 to 1476. He was born into a Jewish family in Vienna. He moved to Buda, the capital of the Kingdom of Hungary, and converted to Roman Catholicism. He became a purveyor to the royal court, which enabled him to meet Matthias Corvinus, King of Hungary. His career in the administration of royal revenues began in 1461, with responsibility for the collection of the thirtieth (a custom duty) in Pozsony County. He purchased copper mines in Upper Hungary (now Slovakia) in 1466.

Ernuszt inspired Matthias's reform of the royal revenues (especially the centralization of their administration and the abolishment of tax exemptions) in 1467. In the same year, the king made him royal treasurer. Six years later, he was appointed ban of Slavonia and became one of the barons of the realm. His most estates were confiscated in the early 1470s, but he had secured the aristocratic status of his family.

== Early career ==
John was born into a Jewish family in Vienna. The date of his birth is unknown. He was also known as John Hampó. He was first mentioned as a burgher in Buda in 1457 or 1458, showing that he had moved from Vienna to the capital of the Kingdom of Hungary. He converted to Roman Catholicism. Since he regularly delivered goods to the royal court, he was introduced to Matthias Corvinus, King of Hungary. Before long, the king made him knight of the royal court.

Emeric Zápolya, who was royal treasurer between 1459 and 1464, tasked John with the administration of the thirtieth (a custom duty) in Pozsony County in 1461. John, and two burghers of Buda, Lawrence Bajoni and Stephen Kovács, concluded an agreement and took charge of the administration of the same tax in the whole kingdom in 1464. John Túz (a former royal treasurer) and John Ernuszt bought two copper mines at Besztercebánya (now Banská Bystrica in Slovakia) and a house in the town from Stephen Jung in 1466. Ernuszt inspired Matthias Corvinus's reform of the royal revenues, especially the centralization of their administration and the abolishment of previous tax exemptions. Matthias also decided to mint new, stable pennies on Ernuszt's advice.

== Royal official and baron ==
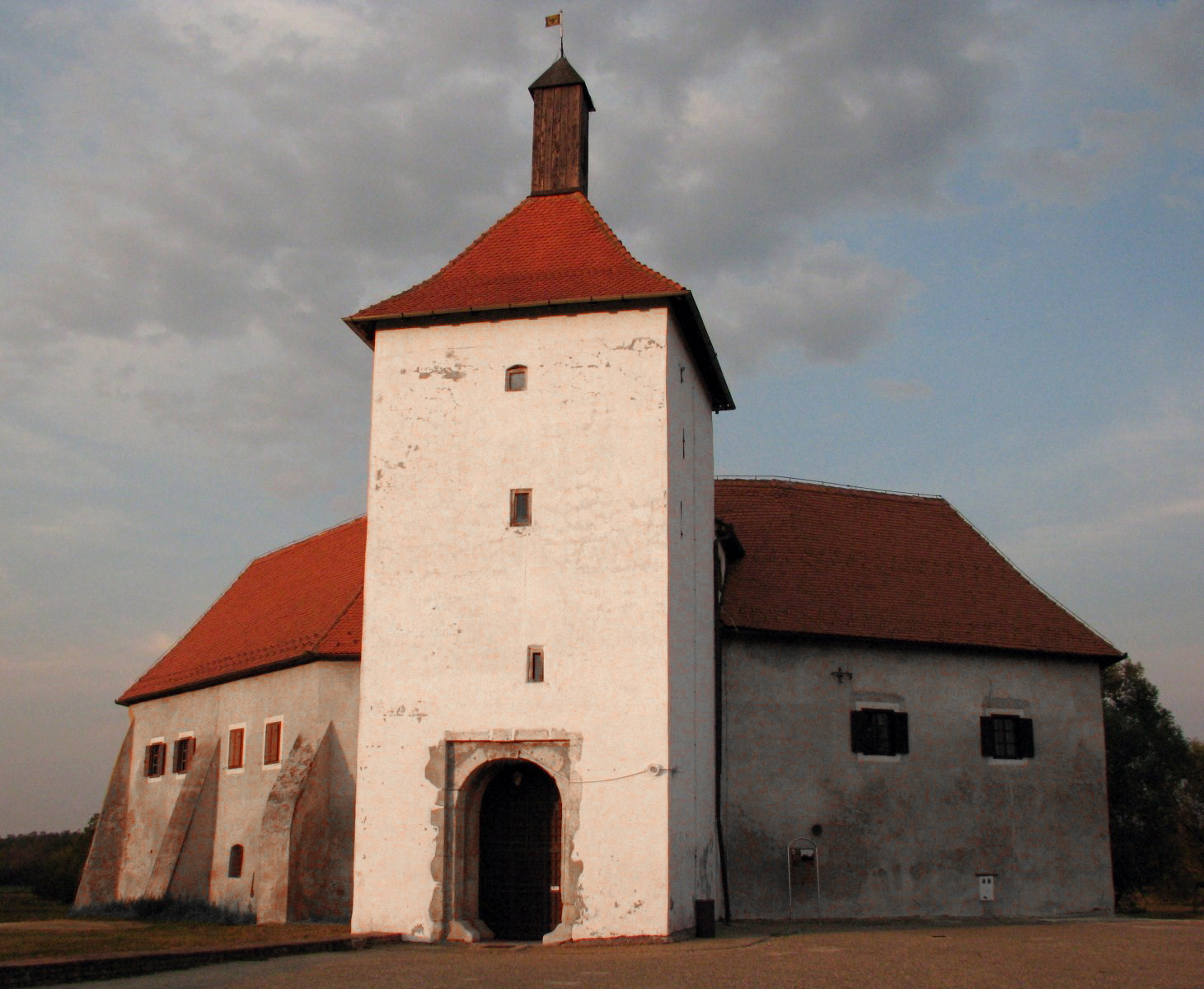
Đurđevac Castle: the castle and the domains attached to it were seized by John

The king made him the administrator of the Crown's customs (a new tax which replaced the thirtieth) in 1467. In the same year, Matthias Corvinus appointed John Ernuszt royal treasurer. He was initially responsible only for the management of the ordinary royal revenues, because Janus Pannonius, Bishop of Pécs, administered all extraordinary income as chief treasurer. From 1468 or 1469, John administered all royal revenues, save for the revenues from royal estates (which were collected by the castellan of Buda).

John persuaded the king to put a new official, the Prefect of the Jews, at the head of the Jewish community in Hungary. The prefects were chosen from among the members of the Mendel family who were allegedly Ernuszt's kinsmen, according to historian Tamás Fedeles. John Ernuszt was made the ispán (or head) of Turóc, Körös and Zólyom Counties in 1470. He was one of the first perpetual ispáns, but he lost this title. The king also confiscated his most estates around 1473, because he was accused of fraud.

Even so, Matthias Corvinus made John ban of Slavonia on 21 November 1473. He was preoccupied with the administration of the royal treasury even thereafter. He received the domain of Csáktornya (Čakovec in Croatia) around that time. He also seized Đurđevac in Slavonia.

The Diet of Hungary assembled in 1474 in the absence of the king who continued his war for the Bohemian Crown. The Estates of the realm passed decrees about the collection and administration of the royal revenues. The new decrees prescribed that taxes were to be spent on the defence against the Ottoman Empire instead of continuing the war for Bohemia. The Diet also authorized the counties to elect officiers to collect the royal taxes, which limited the competence of the royal treasury. At the demand of the Diet, Ernuszt promised that he would execute the new laws. After his return to Hungary, the king made Ernuszt a scapegoat for the decisions adopted at the Diet, but did not dismiss him.

Ernuszt died after 3 March 1476. He was buried in a chapel dedicated to the Holy Virgin in Buda.

== Family ==
His wife was called Catherine, but her family is unknown. Their first son, Sigismund, was born around 1445. Matthias Corvinus made him bishop of Pécs in 1473. John's younger son and namesake was born around 1465. He was Ban of Croatia, Dalmatia and Slavonia. John Ernuszt was one of the few commoners making a career during Matthias Corvinus's reign to be able to secure the aristocratic status of his family.

== Sources ==
- Engel, Pál (2001). The Realm of St Stephen: A History of Medieval Hungary, 895–1526. I.B. Tauris Publishers. ISBN 1-86064-061-3.
- Fedeles, Tamás (2010). Püspökök, prépostok, kanonokok: Fejezetek Pécs középkori egyháztörténetéből [Bishops, Provosts, Canons: Chapters from the Medieval Church History of Pécs] (in Hungarian). Szegedi Tudományegyetem Történeti Intézet. ISBN 978-963-482-990-4.
- Kontler, László (1999). Millennium in Central Europe: A History of Hungary. Atlantisz Publishing House. ISBN 963-9165-37-9.
- Kubinyi, András (2008). Matthias Rex. Balassi Kiadó. ISBN 978-963-506-767-1.
- Markó, László (2006). A magyar állam főméltóságai Szent Istvántól napjainkig: Életrajzi Lexikon [Great Officers of State in Hungary from King Saint Stephen to Our Days: A Biographical Encyclopedia] (in Hungarian). Helikon Kiadó. ISBN 963-547-085-1.

John I House of Ernuszt Born: c. 1420 Died: after 3 March 1476
Political offices
Preceded by Bartholomew Besenyői	Royal treasurer alongside Janus Pannonius until 1469; 1467–1476	Succeeded by George Handó
Preceded by Damian Horvát	Ban of Slavonia; 1473–1476	Succeeded by Ladislaus Egervári
