= Tutova (river) =

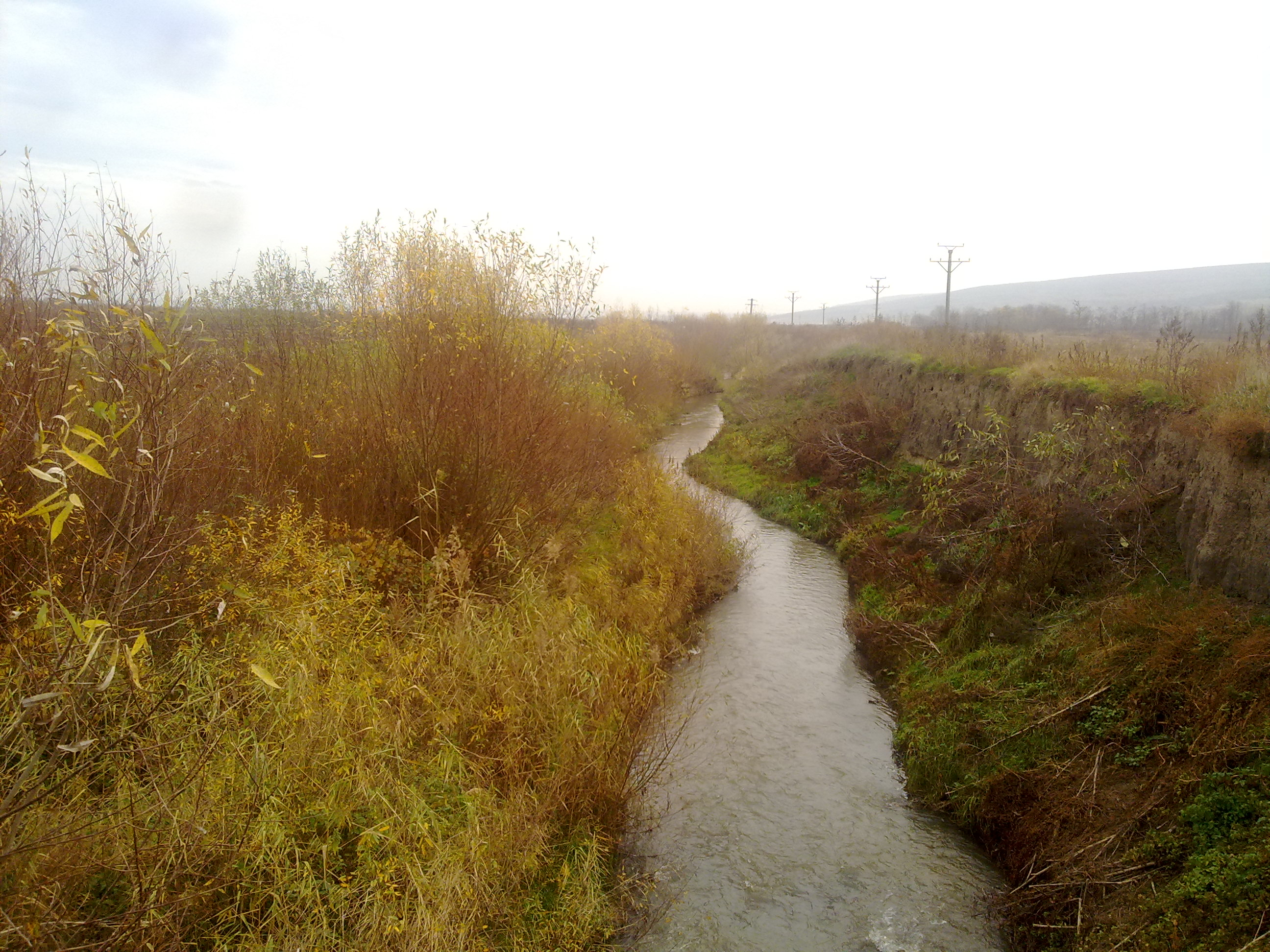

- Location within Romania

Location
- Country: Romania
- Counties: Bacău County, Vaslui County

Physical characteristics
- Mouth: Bârlad
  - location: Tutova
  - coordinates: 46.0996°N 27.5482°E
- Length: 86 km (53 mi)
- Basin size: 687 km^{2} (265 sq mi)
- Discharge
  - location: *
  - average: 0.9 m^{3}/s (32 cu ft/s)

Basin features
- Progression: Bârlad→ Siret→ Danube→ Black Sea

The Tutova is a right tributary of the river Bârlad in Romania. It discharges into the Bârlad near the village Tutova. It flows along the villages of Plopana, Străminoasa, Dragomirești, Mărășești, Puiești, Iana, Pogana, Ciocani, Ivești and Pogonești. Its length is 86 km (53 mi) and its basin size is 687 km^{2} (265 sq mi). The Cuibul Vulturilor Dam is located on the river Tutova.

== Tributaries ==
The following rivers are tributaries to the river Tutova (from source to mouth):

- Left: Lipova, Popești, Iezer, Studineț
- Right: Tulești, Mărul, Fulgul, Ciubota, Cârjoani
