= Aaron the Tyrant =

- Coat of arms of Moldavia, as used during Aaron's reign

Prince of Moldavia (1st reign)
- Reign: September 1591 – June 1592
- Predecessor: Peter the Lame
- Successor: Alexandru III Lăpușneanu

(2nd reign)
- Reign: October 1592 – May 3 or 4, 1595
- Predecessor: Peter the Cossack
- Successor: Ștefan Răzvan
- Born: before 1560
- Died: May 1597; Martinuzzi Castle, Principality of Transylvania, Ottoman Empire
- Spouse: Sultana (Stanca) Köprülü?
- Issue: Marcu Cercel (ad.); Ionașcu Cercel (ad.); Radu Petru Cercel (ad.)
- Dynasty: Bogdan-Mușat?
- Father: Alexandru Lăpușneanu (claimed); Aron of Pozsony?
- Religion: Orthodox

Aaron the Tyrant (Romanian: Aron Tiranul) or Aron Vodă ("Aron the Voivode"; Church Slavonic: Apѡн вода, romanized: Arōn voda), sometimes credited as Aron Emanoil or Emanuel Aaron (German: Aaron Waida, Italian: Aaron Vaivoda, Turkish: Arvan or Zalim; before 1560 – May 1597), was twice the Prince of Moldavia: between September 1591 and June 1592, and October 1592 to May 3 or 4, 1595. He was of mysterious origin, and possibly of Jewish extraction, but presented himself as the son of Alexandru Lăpușneanu, and was recognized as such in some circles. His appointment by the Ottoman Empire followed an informal race, during which candidates engaging in particularly exorbitant bribery and accepted unprecedented increases of the haraç. Though resented by the Janissaries, he was backed by a powerful lobby, comprising Solomon Ashkenazi, Edward Barton, Hoca Sadeddin Efendi, and Patriarch Jeremias II. Victorious but heavily indebted, Aaron allowed his creditors to interfere directly in fiscal policy, while adopting methods of extortion against the taxpaying peasantry. He eventually turned against the bankers, staging the execution of Bartolomeo Brutti.

Following such moves, and his heavy-handed repression of rebels in Lăpușna and Orhei, Aaron was ordered to step down by the Porte. The order was rescinded after two months, which had seen the ascendancy of a rebel Prince, Peter the Cossack. Aaron took back his throne, being increasingly reliant on support from the Principality of Transylvania. He entered his second reign as an obedient vassal of the Ottomans, while also turning against Moldavian Catholicism and expelling the Society of Jesus. In secret, he began negotiating Moldavia's participation in the anti-Ottoman "Holy League", defining himself as an ally of the Holy See and the Holy Roman Empire. This project drew support from Transylvania, which was then under Sigismund Báthory, as well as from Wallachia's Michael the Brave. With the start of the Long Turkish War in 1593, Moldavia became a secondary theater, invaded successively by the Crimean Khanate and the Zaporizhian Sich; after long negotiations, Aaron was able to ally himself with the latter. He then helped Michael of Wallachia attack the Ottoman flank, extending his rule into the Budjak and Northern Dobruja. During the events, he ordered a series of massacres, killing Ottoman Army prisoners and 19 Jewish financiers.

Despite his military commitment and his quashing of a pro-Ottoman uprising, Aaron was viewed with suspicion by Báthory. Their relationship became tense after Aaron declined to swear fealty at the Transylvanian court, preferring instead for Moldavia to be ruled as a component of the Holy Roman Empire. Báthory reportedly undermined the League, depicting Aaron as untrustworthy; he also endorsed the Moldavian general Ștefan Răzvan, who arrested the Prince and took over his throne. Aaron and his family were exiled to Corona (Brașov), then detained at Martinuzzi Castle, Alvinc (Vințu de Jos)—where Aaron died, allegedly poisoned. He was survived by his stepson Marcu Cercel, who attached himself to the Wallachian court and briefly served as Michael's subordinate Prince of Moldavia. Aaron's name is preserved by Aroneanu Church and eponymous village, both of which are located outside Iași. He is also celebrated as a sponsor of the First Romanian School in Șcheii Brașovului.

== Biography ==
=== Debated origins ===
Aaron's origins and early life are a matter of scholarly dispute. His second or non-regnal name, rendered as Emanuel or Emanoil, has been deduced from a German-language document dealing with his bid for the Moldavian throne; historian A. D. Xenopol proposed using it consistently, to distinguish between Aaron and his 15th-century predecessor, Peter Aaron. He depicted himself as a son of Alexandru Lăpușneanu, who had twice ruled upon Moldavia in the 1550s and '60s. He was also recognized as such by the Lviv Dormition Brotherhood, who asked him to resume the patronage of his "saintly deceased father". In 1594, a Pan Drożyński of the Polish–Lithuanian Commonwealth noted that Moldavians recognized kinship between Aaron and the Lăpușneanus: Aaron and Alexandru's daughter Mărica Orzechowska viewed each other as brother and sister, and Orzechowska even joined his court to serve as a translator of Polish. Orzechowska also raised her orphaned niece, Anna Czołhańska, who, according to genealogist Ștefan S. Gorovei, was Aaron's own niece.

Modern scholars who accept Aaron's genealogical claims include Alexandru Lapedatu, who thus argues that Aaron was the final male representative of the Bogdan-Mușat dynasty. In some of his work, historian Nicolae Iorga also credits the genealogy. He once described Aaron as an "unrecognized child" of the Prince, whom he nevertheless resembled, being "mean and gluttonous". Elsewhere, he credited reports that Aaron was a direct descendant of Stephen the Great. Cultural historian Răzvan Theodorescu also endorses the claim.

The Moldavian classical historian Ioan Neculce renders a conflicting account. This depicts young Aaron as the nephew and servant of Moldavian Metropolitan Nicanor, with whom he lived at Agapia Monastery. While there, Aaron seduced a nun, and was caught by Nicanor while returning from her chambers. The bishop punished him with a public beating, then chased him out of the country. A variant of the story was recorded in 1886 by jurist Iancu Cerkez, who refers to Aaron's uncle as Starets Silvan, and notes that the beating occurred when Aaron failed to respect a curfew. According to Cerkez, the boy was not expelled, but rather "fled out of shame and returned only when he could return as a Prince".

Writing before Neculce, the physician Penzen recounted that Aaron was "of the Jewish race". According to researcher Constantin Gane, Aaron was a "Jewish Prince", born as "Solomon Tedeschi [...] to one of our voivodes and a Jewish woman." The identification of Aaron and Tedeschi is nonetheless contradicted by period sources: Solomon Ashkenazi, also known as "Tedeschi", was in fact an influential court Jew of the Ottoman Empire, who backed Aaron in his quest for the throne. Xenopol also argues against the possibility that Aaron was born to a Prince and his Jewish mistress, and proposes that he may have been fully Jewish. He notes that any royal descent would clash with details provided by the chronicler Reinhold Heidenstein; Heidenstein depicts Aaron as a former stablehand for the Moldavian boyardom, and as "having usurped, under whatever circumstances, the title of boyar."

Jewish studies academic Elli Kohen also noted the story regarding Aaron's beginnings in horse grooming, but describes him as a "Pole of hypothetical Jewish extraction". Another researcher, Iosif Sterca-Șuluțiu, rejects both Penzen and Heidenstein's accounts, noting that, if they had been true, they would also have been taken up in political literature. His version, based on theories circulated by the Transylvanian School, is that Aaron was the son of a Romanian expatriate from Royal Hungary, Aron of Pozsony, who in the 1540s had wanted to seize the Moldavian throne as a Habsburg candidate; though existentially opposed to Lăpușneanu, this Aron may have been Lăpușneanu's brother—and son of Bogdan III. Sterca-Șuluțiu reads Aaron's references to "my father" Lăpușneanu as clues that the reigning Prince had adopted him in the 1560s.

Some uncertainty also covers Aaron's matrimonial alliances. One interpretation of period texts suggests that he was the son-in-law of the Ottoman Greek businessman and kingmaker, Andronikos Kantakouzenos; also according to this reading, Kantakouzenos' other daughter was married to Wallachia's Stephen the Deaf. This take was rejected by historian Matei Cazacu, who notes that it is based on a mistranslation by Iorga. Several contemporary accounts mention that Aaron was in fact married to a former wife or concubine of Wallachia's Prince Petru Cercel, whose name was probably Stanca. She was most likely the mother of Marcu Cercel, and possibly also of his brothers Ionașcu and Radu Petru. Stanca may have been an ethnic Turk and a Muslim apostate whose original name was Sultana, and was perhaps also a renegade member of the Köprülü family.

=== Scandalous rise ===
Aaron's career overlapped with a generalized political and economic crisis, observed in both Moldavia and Wallachia (the Danubian Principalities), as well as throughout their suzerain power, the Ottoman Empire. During the late stages of Romanian medieval history, there was a "continuous degradation of the princely office", bringing Moldavia to the "wretched state which had already taken hold in Wallachia". Art historian Corina Nicolescu also describes a "relative stagnation" of cultural development in both states, correlated with the "ever-increasing subjugation" and the "backward characteristics of Turkish society". This decline corresponded with the Ottoman drive for funds: in 1589, Grand Vizier Koca Sinan Pasha acknowledged that his fiscal regime could only supply one third of the imperial expenses. In 1591, Peter the Lame, "unable to meet the incessant demands for money that came from Stamboul", relinquished his Moldavian throne, "rather than to await his own ousting, exile, or killing."

As historian Mihai Maxim notes, Peter was unable to pay his main tribute, or haraç, after the Ottomans' stabilization policy, which included pegging the exchange rate. The Prince also lost the crucial backing of Sinan Pasha, who had been deposed. According to the 17th-century chronicler Grigore Ureche, Peter was ultimately pushed to resign and flee by his patriotism, dismissing the alternative of increasing revenue through taxation: "he did not want the curse of his country to be on him." Xenopol dismisses this reading as "apologetic" and charitable, noting that Peter was well acquainted with the Ottoman practices, and would still have bribed his way to the throne under normal circumstances.

Map of the Reformation and Counter-Reformation in Moldavia, showing the minority Catholic, Hussite and Calvinist groups

Aaron was reportedly familiar to Orthodox Patriarch Jeremias II, who introduced him Edward Barton, the English Ambassador. Both Jeremias and Barton wanted a Prince who would overturn the rise of Catholicism in Moldavia, which Peter the Lame had tolerated or favored; an Orthodox monk, Nikephoros Didaskalos, and a French adventurer, François Ponthus de la Planche, remained in contact with Barton, helping to streamline the project. Aaron's ascent also required joint efforts by Ashkenazi and Barton (who were good friends at the time), and backing from various princesses of the Sultan's Harem. Aaron presented the latter with lavish gifts, including a diamond ring and an emerald necklace. He won additional endorsements from Hoca Sadeddin Efendi and Şeyhülislām Bostanzade. He defeated powerful contenders, including Ștefan, who was the son of Ilie II Rareș, and Lăpușneanu's known son, Peter the Cossack. Another candidate was Alexandru III Lăpușneanu, Aaron's alleged nephew, who had backing from the Janissaries. In one incident of the interregnum, Alexandru's supporters raided Patriarchy buildings; they demanded that Aaron be sent to live as a prisoner in Aleppo.

In order to ensure his victory, Aaron is alleged to have paid officials at the Ottoman court 110 million akçeler. This "fantastic sum", equivalent to some 917,000 ducats, was borrowed from traders and creditors at 20% interest. Some of the scripts were owned by Barton and the Levant Company, marking an early step in the evolution of Anglo–Moldavian diplomatic contacts. Kohen sees the alliance between Ashkenazi and Barton as motivated by two sets of interests: the former wanted a "more humane treatment for Jews in the semi-autonomous principality", while Barton responded to Elizabethan priorities, aiming to increase influence in Eastern Europe.

This selection process by the Ottomans marked a low in Moldavian history, described by Iorga as a "bargain". It also provided the Sultan Murad III with new sources of income: as recounted by Mustafa Selaniki (and supported by Maxim), Aaron had promised to collect an even higher haraç than his predecessors. The tribute for Aaron's first year was set at about 60,000 sequins, possibly ten times its regular value, and the absolute highest sum to be paid by Moldavia. As noted by Maxim, when coupled with the princely credits and with the demographic decline affecting taxable income, this pledge created an "impossible situation". Xenopol describes taxation as handled directly by the Prince's creditors, a "continuous stream of Turks". They resorted to torturing peasants in their attempt to recover lost revenue, and also invented an "unprecedented tax", collecting one ox from each family of taxpayers. Sterca-Șuluțiu, however, questions whether the measure was truly unique or completely devastating.

As noted in Grigore Ureche's hostile account, Aaron's policies made the peasants into quasi-serfs. Ureche attributes this development to flaws of character, claiming that Aaron "never grew tired of fornicating and gambling". Neculce also claims that Aaron acted out of personal revenge, as when he allegedly captured his "uncle" Nicanor and castrated him. More in detail, Ureche accuses Aaron of raping boyaresses and women from the peasantry. Sterca-Șuluțiu challenges this account, noting that Ureche fails to record a concrete case, or name the alleged victims.

=== First rule ===
Several other controversial developments occurred under Aaron. Some had to do with the rising influence of immigrant Greeks. Medievalist Ioan Caproșu argues that Aaron's reign inaugurated the monopolizing of Vistier (treasurer) offices by "intermediaries of the Oriental trade". At any one time, three of his eleven high courtiers were Greek; Aaron inherited from his predecessor Peter the Vistier Iani Kalogeras, who enjoyed the third-longest time in office of any Moldavian treasurer between 1600 and 1700. His Postelnic was a Iane, possibly the same identified as an "Epirote" in earlier documents, while the first of his Spatharii was Constantin Vorsi; in 1594, his Paharnic was an Albanian, Nicolae Coci. At some point in 1593, Andronikos became Moldavia's Ban.

In 1591, the Boyar Council also included another Vistier, known as Planica or Planița. According to medievalist Ștefan Andreescu, this was a Slavonic name for Ponthus de la Planche. The non-native retinue was enhanced by a permanent guard of Hungarian mercenaries, who proved crucial in protecting Aaron during subsequent revolts. Both Iorga and Gheorghe I. Brătianu argue that they were inherited from Peter the Lame, and as such comprised up to 400 men "dressed in Hungarian clothing, with swords on their belts and battle axes in hand". These soldiers ensued a bridge of communication with the neighboring Principality of Transylvania, and made Aaron's Moldavia heavily dependent on Transylvanian assistance.

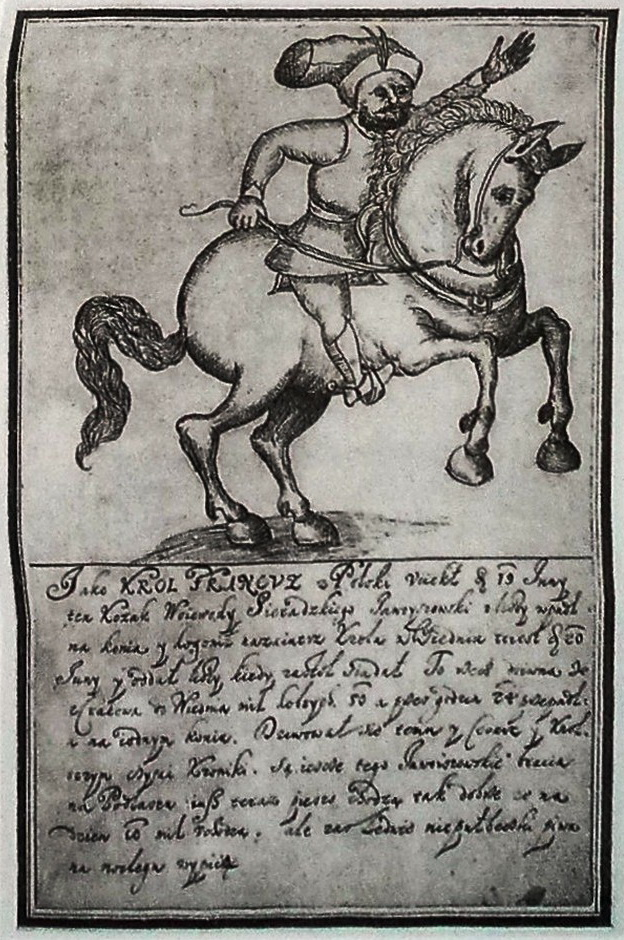
A Cossack cavalryman in a 1587 manuscript

Aaron soon faced rebellions of the local boyars and burghers. Some of these were probably instigated by brothers Bogdan Ionașcu and Peter the Cossack, which may have prompted Aaron to turn against another kingmaking financier, Bartolomeo Brutti. Brutti, also known as a supporter of Moldavian Catholicism, was executed in April 1592; his entire estate, valued at 30,000 ducats, was confiscated by the state. Aaron probably confiscated Brutti's villages of Săbăoani and Berindești, largely settled by Catholic Csangos; these later appeared as property of the Orthodox monks of Secu.

In May, after riots in Lăpușna and Orhei, Aaron ordered the execution of "treasonous" courtiers, Logothete Zaharia Bârlădeanu and Vornic Condrea Bucium. He failed to capture the Pârcălab of Suceava, Andrei Corcodel, who fled over the border into Ottoman territory. Aaron then gathered the Moldavian military forces and organized the offensive against Bogdan Ionașcu. The armies clashed on the Răut, in present-day Moldova. Bogdan was defeated, mutilated, and sent to live in a monastery; his followers were decimated. The rebellion also prompted Aaron to operate changes in Lăpușna's administration, which had shown itself to be permeated by Brutti's retinue.

The violence and instability called for the Porte's direct intervention. In June, Murad heard a complaint from the boyars, but was unpersuaded. He informed the petitioners that they risked losing their country's privileges, and that he considered making Moldavia into a Muslim beylerbeylik. However, the Ottomans "always sacked those Princes unlucky enough to have sparked an unrest". They eventually deposed Aaron, before June 20, at which date the creditors were already pleading for him to be reinstated. As noted by Iorga, the intrigue involved his alleged nephew, Alexandru III. There was also a competition between Bogdan Ionașcu and Peter the Cossack, again centered on haraç offers; Alexandru emerged as the winner, but was then usurped by his uncle Peter, who invaded the country alongside Cossacks from the Zaporizhian Sich. With support from his creditors, and, this time, with crucial backing from the Janissaries, Aaron was reappointed ruler for the second time after a two-month absence. Sultan Murad asked his other vassal, Transylvanian Prince Sigismund Báthory, to depose Peter. The expedition, led by Gáspár Sibrik, ensured that Aaron could return to a pacified Moldavia.

=== Into the Holy League ===
In September 1592, Aaron sent a trusted Moldavian, the Postelnic Oprea, to seize control of the court in Iași and prepare the terrain for his arrival. As Ispravnic of the throne, Oprea tied but failed to capture a hostile boyar, Nestor Ureche, who managed to cross the border into Poland–Lithuania. The loyalists also captured Prince Peter, Aaron's alleged half-brother, after a battle outside Iași. Aaron had him mutilated, then sent him to Murad, who ordered him impaled on hooks. The restored Prince followed up on his old policies, and, by February 1593, had confiscated Corcodel's estates in such places as Lălești, Climăuți, and Zăvădeni. At some point before April 1593 and December 1594, Aaron executed another rebellious boyar, Vartic, who had put up resistance in the Eastern Carpathians.

The 1592 return also encouraged anti-Catholicism in Moldavia, disassembling Brutti's contributions. Already by August, Aaron restored recognition for the Moldavian Hussites, and reestablished Brethren churches, closed down under Peter the Lame. This move may have been dictated by Ambassador Barton, who claimed that Aaron was effectively taking orders from the Church of England through English missionaries Thomas Wilcox and Richard Babynton. Before January 1593, Aaron finally clamped down on Catholicism itself, expelling the Society of Jesus from Moldavia. Wilcox reported that such moved delighted the various Moldavian Protestants, "who dailie praye for her Majestie's longe lif and good prosperitie".

As argued to Maxim, Aaron's return marked Moldavia's passage into another era, resuming "anti-Ottoman struggles" at a level of violence not seen since the times of Petru Rareș (in the 1540s). Aaron was determined to end his cohabitation with the Ottomans, receiving offers for a military alliance from the Holy Roman Empire, from Pope Clement VIII and, sometime after, from Wallachia's Michael the Brave—the new "Holy League". He sent his own letters to the Holy See, implying that his attitude toward Catholicism was now respectful and friendly, and even hinting to the Primacy of Peter. In tandem, he embarked on a secretive dialogue with Rudolf II, Emperor of the Romans, offering to join the alliance after receiving fail-safe guarantees. He also received reports from the imperial officer Valentin Prepostváry von Lokács, who informed him about the victory at Stuhlweißenburg. Prepostváry invited him to take up arms as a successor to Stephen the Great, "whose warrior fame and name live on to this day". In his reply, Aaron expressed pleasure, but asked for Emperor Rudolf to contact him in person.

On January 28, 1593, unaware of such dealings, Sultan Murad had set high tributary obligations for Moldavia, which may have included a hike of 30,000 sequins. In summer of that year, Moldavia became a secondary theater for the Long Turkish War, declared by Rudolf and his allies against the Ottomans. In December 1593, Zaporizhians raided Silistra Eyalet, devastating areas around Bender. They were led by Hetman Hryhoriy Loboda, who, according to a 17th-century source, were assisted by the former Moldavian Postelnic, Meleșan. The Crimean Khanate, as an Ottoman proxy, led a counteroffensive into Pokuttya, which was a bridgehead into Partium and Royal Hungary. Aaron informed Transylvania of this move, allowing Cossacks and Hungarians to contain that threat. One of his letters went to the city government of Beszterce (Bistrița), advising it to close down and guard the road from Baia.

As recounted by Michael's physician and diplomat Balthasar Walther, Aaron welcomed at Iași Aleksandar Komulović, the papal envoy, and then, in a coordinated move with Michael, stopped paying his haraç; other sources mention direct negotiations between the Wallachian and Moldavian rulers, arranged by and through Preda or Stroe Buzescu. Other reports suggest that Komulović first met Aaron and Michael's envoys to Transylvania in February 1594, at Feyérvár (Bălgrad), though it is unclear if they sealed a working alliance there and then. The League had also attracted similar pledges from Sigismund Báthory, who, as noted by various scholars, had been recognized by Aaron as his new liege. Others dispute that this vassalage was ever anything more than Báthory's wishful thinking. In March Moldavia also received an imperial embassy led by Giovanni di Marini Poli, or "Raguseus". The treaty he signed with Aaron created the possibility for Moldavia to be placed under imperial immediacy; at this stage, Aaron was only required to spy on the Ottomans.

=== Revolt ===
The Holy League (purple; Orthodox members in darker shade) and theaters of war in 1595. Ottoman Empire in green; in yellow: Polish–Lithuanian Commonwealth and Swedish Empire (in personal union under Sigismund III Vasa)

During those weeks, Rudolf involved Moldavia's court in his effort to forge an alliance that would strike the Ottomans in Dobruja and move toward Adrianople. The core of the invasion was to be a Wallachian–Moldavian–Zaporizhian alliance, but Rudolf also hoped to attract the Tsardom of Russia and at least some support from the Poles. In April, Komulović met with the Cossack Severyn Nalyvaiko at Kamianets-Podilskyi, and the Sich was formally co-opted into the League. Aaron shared these goals, dispatching his own delegation—comprising Kalogeras and the new Logothete, Crăciun Grigorcea—to negotiate with the Zaporizhians. His court was visited by the Russian merchant Trifon Korobeynikov, who records that the Prince stood up to honor Tsar Feodor at every mention of his name. Aaron also made Vorsi his ambassador to Kraków, hoping to draw Polish support for the uprising. This initiative was defeated by Chancellor Jan Zamoyski, who pursued a pro-Ottoman line and tried to quell a Cossack insurgency, and who probably informed Murad of Aaron's betrayal.

The Ottomans again asked from their Crimean vassals that they intervene. Ğazı II Giray submitted, staging a raid on Moldavia: in June 1594, the Crimeans encircled Aron in his capital of Iași, then devastated the surrounding region. Zamoyski made a perfunctory show of support for Moldavia, sending in the Polish-Lithuanian army. In August, it had only reached as far south as Cernăuți (Chernivtsi). The Crimean hordes were nevertheless weakened by the Cossack invasion into their own base, and were vulnerable to attacks when grazing their horses. In July, Cossack troops returned to Moldavia. They were nominally allies of the Empire and responded to Komulović, but were in practice uncontrollable; they also regarded Aaron as a facilitator of the Crimeans, who had allowed Giray passage through Moldavia. Loboda and Nalyvaiko fused their armies, conquering and razing Țuțora before taking Iași, destroying Moldavia's artillery in the process. Aaron, having panicked, barricaded himself in Putna Monastery. He eventually agreed to pay Loboda a large ransom in exchange for his subjects' safety. With help from Báthory and Logothete Ivan Norocea, Aaron was also able to crush another insurgency by pro-Ottoman boyars. Their attempt at a coup formed part of a larger plot involving Balthasar Báthory, nephew of the Transylvanian Prince, and Sándor Kendi.

By September 1594, the League project seemed abortive, with the Ottoman Army winning control of Raab and Komorn, from where it could threaten Vienna. According to Michael the Brave's own recollection, the sultan demanded that he and Aaron "unite" with Ottoman and Crimean troops from Dobruja, and "annihilate" Transylvania. During that interval, Aaron secretly traveled to parlay with the Transylvanians, passing through Corona (Brașov) on September 24.

He and Michael began coordinating their open rebellion, which would open a new battlefield behind Ottoman lines. Their uprising began on November 13, with Ottoman garrisons in both countries being overpowered and massacred. In Aaron's territories, victims included four Çavuşlar, whom Murad had sent over with gifts, hoping to restore Ottoman suzerainty amiably. By then, the Prince had also resumed his practice of dealing violently with his earlier sponsors, executing without trial a Greek banker, Nestor Nevridis, and 19 of his Jewish creditors. He forfeited all payments on Barton and Ashkenazi's loans; when the latter arrived to complain in Iași, Aaron had him arrested and sent as a prisoner to Transylvania.

In October, Pope Clement was informed that Aaron had "joined with" Michael and Prince Báthory—the latter, however, presented this treaty as his annexation of both Wallachia and Moldavia. Sultan Murad formally declared war on all three countries on November 28, but Michael had the initiative throughout December. In January 1595, Moldavia signed an alliance with the Zaporizhians, being thus "able to enlist them, if only in part, the Romanians' struggle for liberation." Aaron then moved against the Ottomans, joining forces with Michael and Báthory in their raiding of Budjak and Dobruja. Polish writer Bartosz Paprocki recounts that Aaron gathered a new cohort of recruits, promising them that they could keep all spoils of war they captured individually. He "did not have a large army, but following his pledge his soldiers grew in numbers"; one estimate counts 15,000 Moldavians, with an additional 5,000 Transylvanians. Overturning the tide, they killed as many as 12,000 Crimeans on the field of battle, and captured another 1,000. A Venetian report of that period claims that Aaron thoroughly destroyed the Ottoman fortifications at Bender.

Assisted by Transylvanians and Cossacks, the Moldavians took Cetatea Albă, Ismail and Chilia by March; two detachments crossed over the Danube and defeated the Crimeans in Dobruja, seizing Oblucița. According to various reports, the Ottoman Army, defeated by Michael at Silistra and Turtukai, included in its ranks Stephen the Deaf, sent in by the Porte to replace Aaron, and Ștefan Bogdan Sasul, who sought the crown of Wallachia. After this strike, Aaron had extended his rule into all of Northern Dobruja, and had captured an unexpectedly large loot, including 100 cannons taken at Ismail. Paprocki believes that "8,000 Turks were killed in that battle".

=== Downfall and death ===
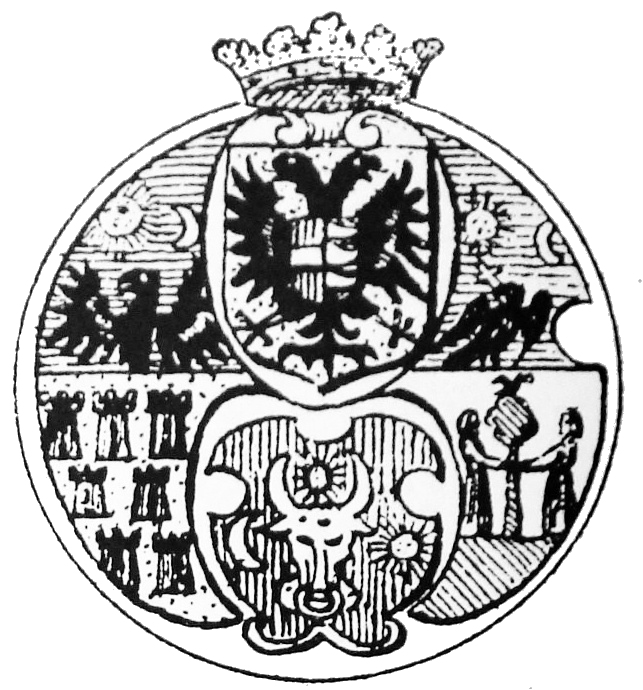
Greater coat of arms of Sigismund Báthory in 1597, displaying the Moldavian emblem alongside the Transylvanian and Wallachian arms, with the Reichsadler and the Báthory family's "dragon teeth"

Prince Báthory was unpersuaded by Aaron's efforts, moved to have him deposed and replaced. According to Marini Poli, the Moldavian ruler was preparing for a separate peace with the Ottomans, being instigated into this by his Greek advisers, the "enemies of Christendom". The period witnessed the arrival in Moldavia of Nikephoros Didaskalos, who agitated against alliances with the Catholics, seeing them as tools for a restored communion with the Holy See. The Pope received news that Aaron intended to "place himself and his belongings under [Poland's] protection"; in contrast, Paprocki noted that Aaron was accused of conspiring mainly with Andrew Báthory, the Prince's cousin and main rival.

A fragmentary Wallachian chronicle, copied by Stoica Ludescu, describes all such allegations of treason as "mendacious charges". Similarly, Xenopol notes that the accusation itself is incongruous, since Aaron had already made a public show of his disdain for Murad. He believes that Prince Báthory was in fact angered by Aaron having declined to swear fealty during a public ceremony, which was set to take place in Transylvania. A Transylvanian diplomat, Kristóf Keresztúri, had brought back news that Aaron only recognized as his sovereigns "the Pope and His Sacred Imperial Majesty", viewing Báthory as a mere colleague.

The instrument of Prince Báthory's coup was Ștefan Răzvan, who had assumed control of Aaron's Hungarian guard. Famous for being a man of Romany (Gypsy) ethnicity, he had shown bravery in battle, but, according to Walther, was already "perfidious" toward his employer; according to Paprocki, he was Báthory's "man of trust" in Moldavia. Aaron and his family were captured and detained at Iași by Báthory's men. As Xenopol notes, the populace never came to their rescue, still resenting the Prince "for his earlier plunders". The final day of his rule was April 23 or 24 (May 3 or 4 in New Style). Upon replacing him, Răzvan formally pledged not to hand territory back to the Ottomans. Witnesses of the day report that the new ruler had extremely little authority, with all tax revenue in Moldavia being collected by the Transylvanian treasury.

Assisted by the Cossacks, Báthory also purged the Moldavian boyardom of its Polish-supporting members. An avviso of May 1595 suggests that Aaron had entrusted his "sister", who was most likely Orzechowska, to look after "the principal fort" in Moldavia. According to that source, she and her children were captured and murdered there by the new coup organizers. Various records indicate that Aaron and his remaining family were taken into Transylvania shortly after Orthodox Easter 1595. During this interval, he had contacts with the Saxon community: between May 9 and 17, while the family lodged with Johann Hirscher of Corona, Aaron met and befriended chronicler Michael Weiß, who became his confidant. The former Prince was later imprisoned at Martinuzzi Castle in Alvinc (Vințu de Jos), where he spent the remainder of his life. The most precising dating of his death is May 1597.

As argued by historian Marius Diaconescu, the new Moldo–Wallachian–Transylvanian alliances negotiated immediately after Aaron's downfall were effectively a union of the three countries under Báthory's scepter, and masterminded by István Jósika. However, according to Ludescu's narrative, Aaron's downfall soured relations between Wallachia and Transylvania: Michael, who was not involved in the plot, looked "saddened" by news of his friend's arrest. His death in custody was also a point of contention between the Transylvanians and Wallachians in the period leading up to Mihael's conquest of Transylvania. As late as 1601, in his letters to Rudolf, Michael alleged that Báthory's betrayals of the Holy League included killing Aaron. In this account, the deposed Prince had been made to drink "venom". A similar narrative is provided by Weiß, who further indicates Jósika as the principal culprit. Various modern historians also agree that Aaron may have indeed been assassinated.

According to his own testimony, Michael had Aaron buried in the new Orthodox church at Bălgrad, alongside a number of Wallachian boyars. In 1600, however, Michael's hold on the region was challenged by a Transylvanian civil war, opposing Michael to the Báthorys and to the Imperial warlord Giorgio Basta. Basta recaptured Bălgrad, and ordered the church vandalized. Aaron's remains were desecrated, or, as Michael notes: "they dug up the bones [...] and cast them out; even pagans had refrained from such inhuman deeds."

== Legacy ==
Various accounts from the 1600s include brief notes about Aaron having several children or "sons". Some confusion regarding survivors from Aaron's family was sparked by a Mantuan report of 1595, which claimed that his widow, "Velica", had remarried the Transylvanian courtier Fabio Genga. This information was refuted by other evidence, showing that Genga's wife was actually Logothete Norocea's daughter and sister-in-law of Mihnea Turcitul. Aaron's real widow reunited with his stepson Marcu Cercel, and together they made their way to Bucharest, joining Michael's retinue before January 1598. A note by the Polish diplomat Andrzej Tarnowski also mentions them traveling together with Aron's natural son, whose name he renders as Iliaș. Scholar Maria-Venera Rădulescu finds this an unreliable account, and argues that Tarnowski actually refers to Marcu's brother Ionașcu, who was not Aaron's blood relative.

A discredited theory, proposed by historian Ilie Minea, argues that Tarnowski's "Marcu" refers to Aaron's natural son, who had the same name as Cercel. Other scholarship traced the events of Cercel's subsequent life: he remained a close associate of Michael; in July–September 1600, when Michael conquered and held Moldavia, he reigned as a subordinate Prince in Iași. In competition with his brother Radu Petru, he also continued to claim the throne of Wallachia into the 1610s. By 1614, a Venetian adventurer, Zuanbattista Locadello, was hoping to obtain the Moldavian crown, presenting himself as Aaron's son. His conflict with the Bailo brought his arrest by the Ottomans and death in custody. Taking the Moldavian throne in 1634, Vasile Lupu, who was the son of Nicolae Coci and therefore Albanian, also encouraged rumors that he was actually Aaron's illegitimate child.

One more tradition claims Aaron as the ancestor of Petru Pavel Aron, an 18th-century Romanian intellectual and bishop of the Transylvanian Greek Catholic Church. This claim was recorded by scholar Gheorghe Șincai, who commented that it was "not baseless", and explored in more depth by Iosif Sterca-Șuluțiu, who was an Aron on his mother's side. According to the latter, Prince Aaron and Bishop Aron were collaterally related, from two lines originating with Aron of Pozsony.

Aaron's alliance with Michael in mid 1594 incidentally marks the final point of the Moldavian historical epic, as told by Grigore Ureche, and the first chapter of its continuation by Miron Costin. At Agapia, a local legend calls a stone landmark with faint carvings "Aron's Rock", claiming it as a monument to Nicanor's punishment and its avenging by the Prince. His legacy in culture also includes his sponsoring of St. Nicholas Church and of the First Romanian School, both of them in Șcheii Brașovului. This activity preoccupied him during late 1594, and again during his Transylvanian exile.

In his native Moldavia, Aaron was primarily remembered as a ktitor of the eponymous Aroneanu Church, on the Ciric Valley—though this was most likely first built by his alleged father, Lăpușneanu. Ureche sees the church's rebuilding, which he dates to Anno Mundi 7102 (1594), as evidence that Aaron was finally atoning "for his many sins [and] trying to avert his punishment." As noted by Iorga, the Prince purposefully avoided making this establishment into a metochion of Mount Athos, resenting the Greek monks' accumulation of wealth. Included by Nicolescu among the more innovative buildings of late-medieval Moldavian art, with a typically Wallachian porch, Aroneanu borrows features from Ottoman architecture, including elements of tessellation which also influenced later work at Rădeana. The building was heavily deteriorated and vandalized during the Soviet incursion of August 1944, and later restored; its name survives in the appellation of a surrounding village, also known as Aroneanu. Its arms, adopted in 2004, include a visual reference to Prince Aaron (a chief ermine).

Art historian Vasile Drăguț proposes that the late-medieval Princes who "made anti-Ottoman struggle their supreme policy objective" were also attuned to Western figurative art, introducing its canons in their respective countries. A Western-style portrait of Prince Aaron, painted in 1594, is kept at the Hungarian National Museum in Budapest. The piece is a relevant source for the coat of arms of Moldavia, depicting an aurochs head, blazoned proper, on azure shield, with one star, gules. Monochrome heraldic objects left by Aron include a seal he used in May 1593, which is also the first ever visual association between the Moldavian aurochs head and a sun.

Heraldic seal of Marcu Cercel as claimant Prince of Moldavia

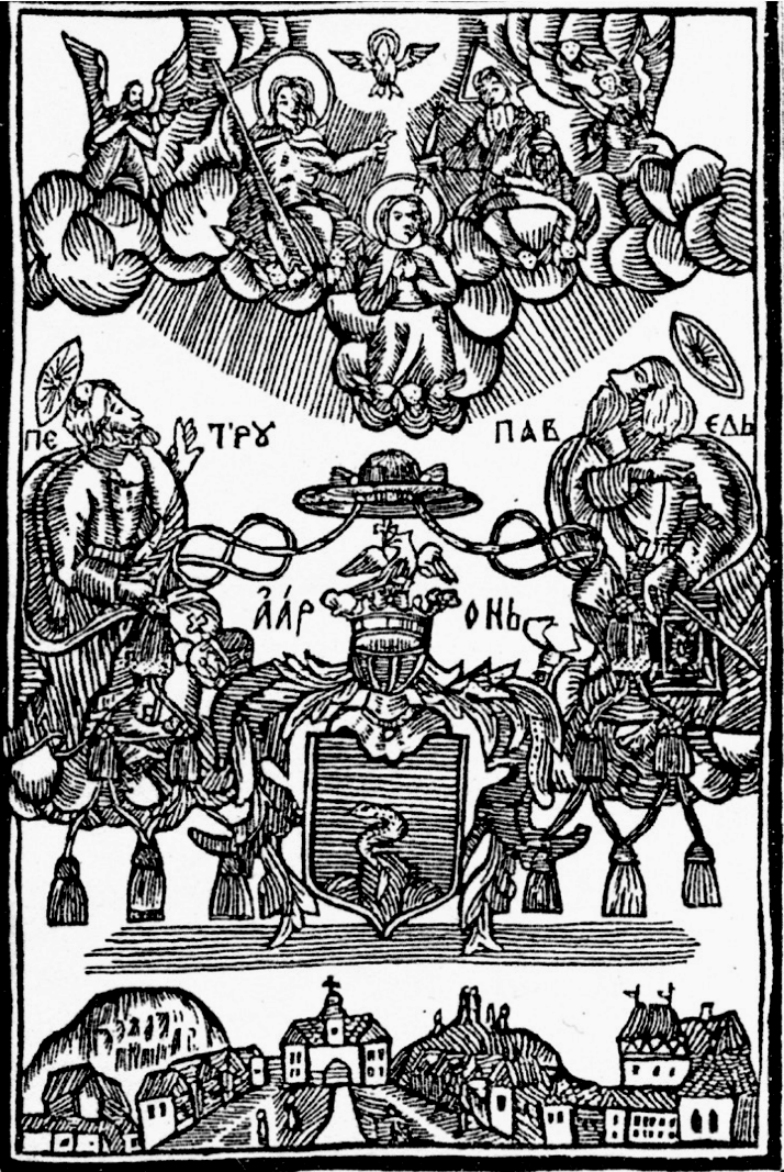
Coat of arms of Petru Pavel Aron, in a 1760 illustration

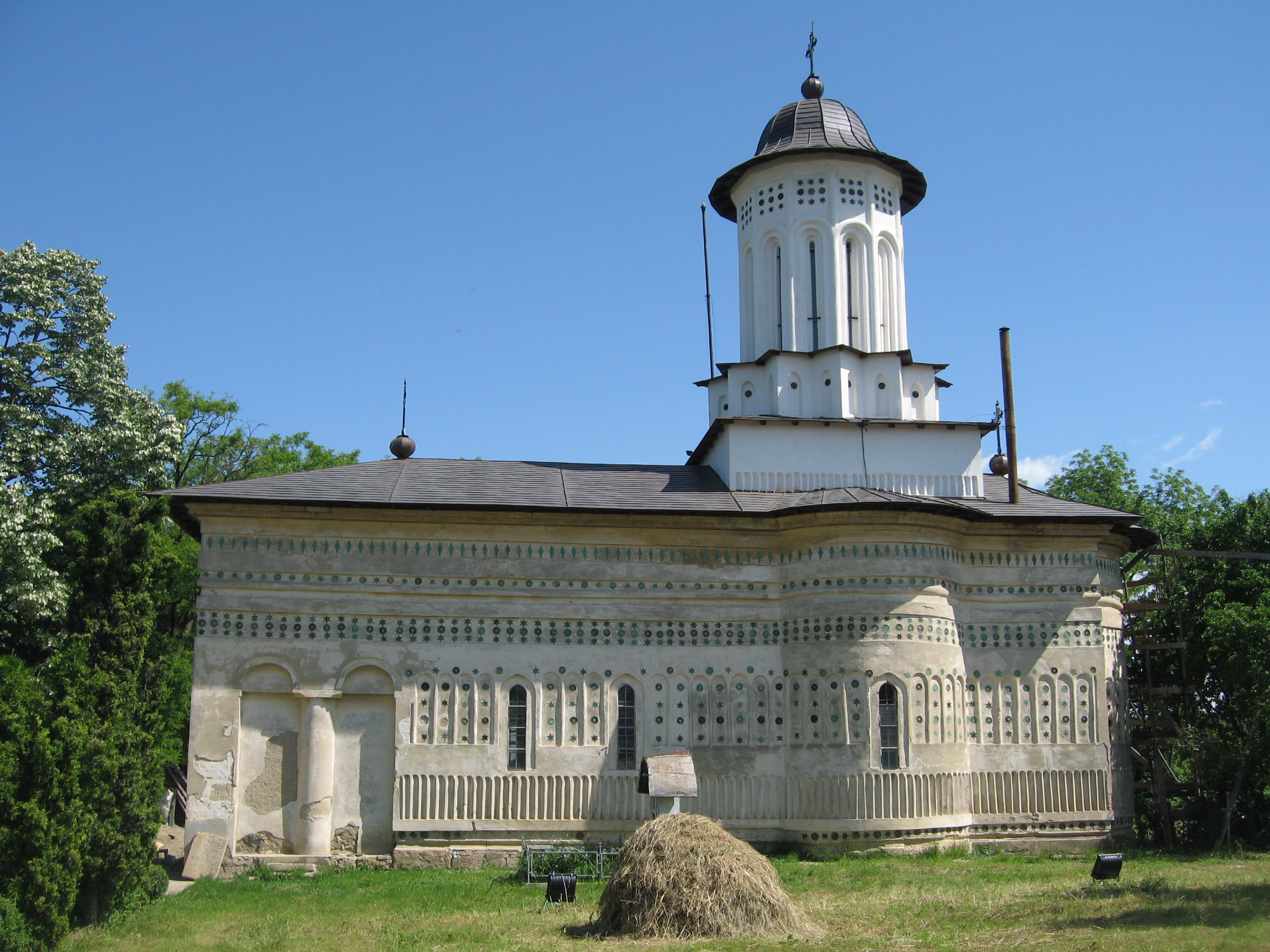
Aroneanu Church in 2008

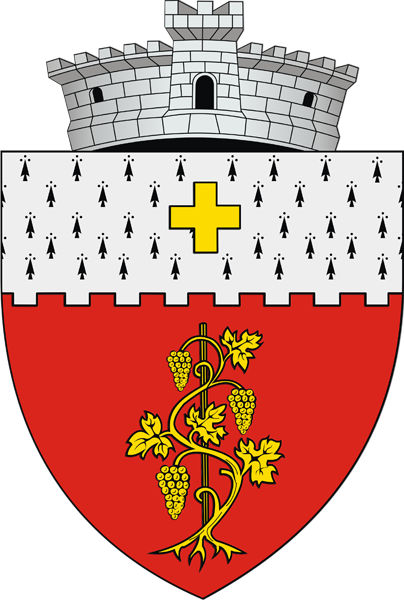
Municipal coat of arms of Aroneanu

== Notes ==
Regnal titles
Preceded by Peter the Lame	Prince of Moldavia; 1591–1592	Succeeded by Alexandru cel Rău
Preceded by Peter the Cossack	Prince of Moldavia; 1592–1595	Succeeded by Ștefan Răzvan
