= Studineț =

- Location within Romania

Location
- Country: Romania
- Counties: Vaslui County
- Villages: Corodești, Gherghești, Hălărești

Physical characteristics
- Mouth: Tutova
  - location: Iana
  - coordinates: 46.3838°N 27.5468°E
- Length: 28 km (17 mi)
- Basin size: 96 km^{2} (37 sq mi)

Basin features
- Progression: Tutova→ Bârlad→ Siret→ Danube→ Black Sea
- Tributaries
  - left: Micești

The Studineț is a left tributary of the river Tutova in Romania. It discharges into the Tutova in Iana. Its length is 28 km (17 mi) and its basin size is 96 km^{2} (37 sq mi).
