= Iezer =

Iezer may refer to several places in Romania:

- Iezer, a village in Hilișeu-Horia Commune, Botoșani County
- Iezer, a village in Puiești Commune, Vaslui County
- Iezer Mountains in Argeș County
- Iezer, a tributary of the Ighiu in Alba County
- Iezer (Tutova), tributary of the Tutova in Vaslui County
- Iezer, a tributary of the Mălaia in Vâlcea County
- Iezerul Mare, a tributary of the Bătrâna in Argeș County
