= Crivești =

Crivești may refer to several villages in Romania:

- Crivești, a village in Strunga Commune, Iași County
- Crivești, a village in Vânători Commune, Iași County
- Crivești, a village in Tutova Commune, Vaslui County
