= Iezer (Tutova) =

- Location within Romania

Location
- Country: Romania
- Counties: Vaslui County
- Villages: Obârșenii Lingurari, Corobănești, Ruși

Physical characteristics
- Source: Obârșeni
- Mouth: Tutova
  - coordinates: 46.4078°N 27.5221°E
- Length: 28 km (17 mi)
- Basin size: 65 km^{2} (25 sq mi)

Basin features
- Progression: Tutova→ Bârlad→ Siret→ Danube→ Black Sea

The Iezer is a left tributary of the river Tutova in Romania. It discharges into the Tutova in the village Iezer. Its length is 28 km (17 mi) and its basin size is 65 km^{2} (25 sq mi).
