= Sălceni =

Sălceni may refer to several villages in Romania:

- Sălceni, a village in Ceatalchioi Commune, Tulcea County
- Sălceni, a village in Pochidia Commune, Vaslui County
