= Lipova (river) =

- Location within Romania

Location
- Country: Romania
- Counties: Bacău, Vaslui
- Villages: Lipova, Doagele

Physical characteristics
- Mouth: Tutova
  - location: Băbuța
  - coordinates: 46.6191°N 27.3480°E
- Length: 25 km (16 mi)
- Basin size: 76 km^{2} (29 sq mi)

Basin features
- Progression: Tutova→ Bârlad→ Siret→ Danube→ Black Sea

Lipova is a river in Romania. It is a left tributary of the Tutova. It flows into the Tutova in Băbuța. Its length is 25 km (16 mi) and its basin size is 76 km^{2} (29 sq mi).
