= Ivești =

Iveşti may refer to several places in Romania:

- Ivești, Galați, a commune in Galați County
- Ivești, Vaslui, a commune in Vaslui County
