= Draxeni =

Draxeni or Drăxeni may refer to:

- Drăxeni, a village in Gherghești Commune, Vaslui County, Romania
- Draxeni, a village in Rebricea Commune, Vaslui County, Romania
