= Ciubota =

- Location within Romania

Location
- Country: Romania
- Counties: Vaslui County
- Villages: Cetățuia

Physical characteristics
- Mouth: Tutova
  - location: Iezer
  - coordinates: 46.4036°N 27.5265°E
- Length: 11 km (6.8 mi)
- Basin size: 33 km^{2} (13 sq mi)

Basin features
- Progression: Tutova→ Bârlad→ Siret→ Danube→ Black Sea

The Ciubota is a right tributary of the river Tutova in Romania. It flows into the Tutova in Iezer. Its length is 11 km (6.8 mi) and its basin size is 33 km^{2} (13 sq mi).
