= Vințu de Jos =

- Commune
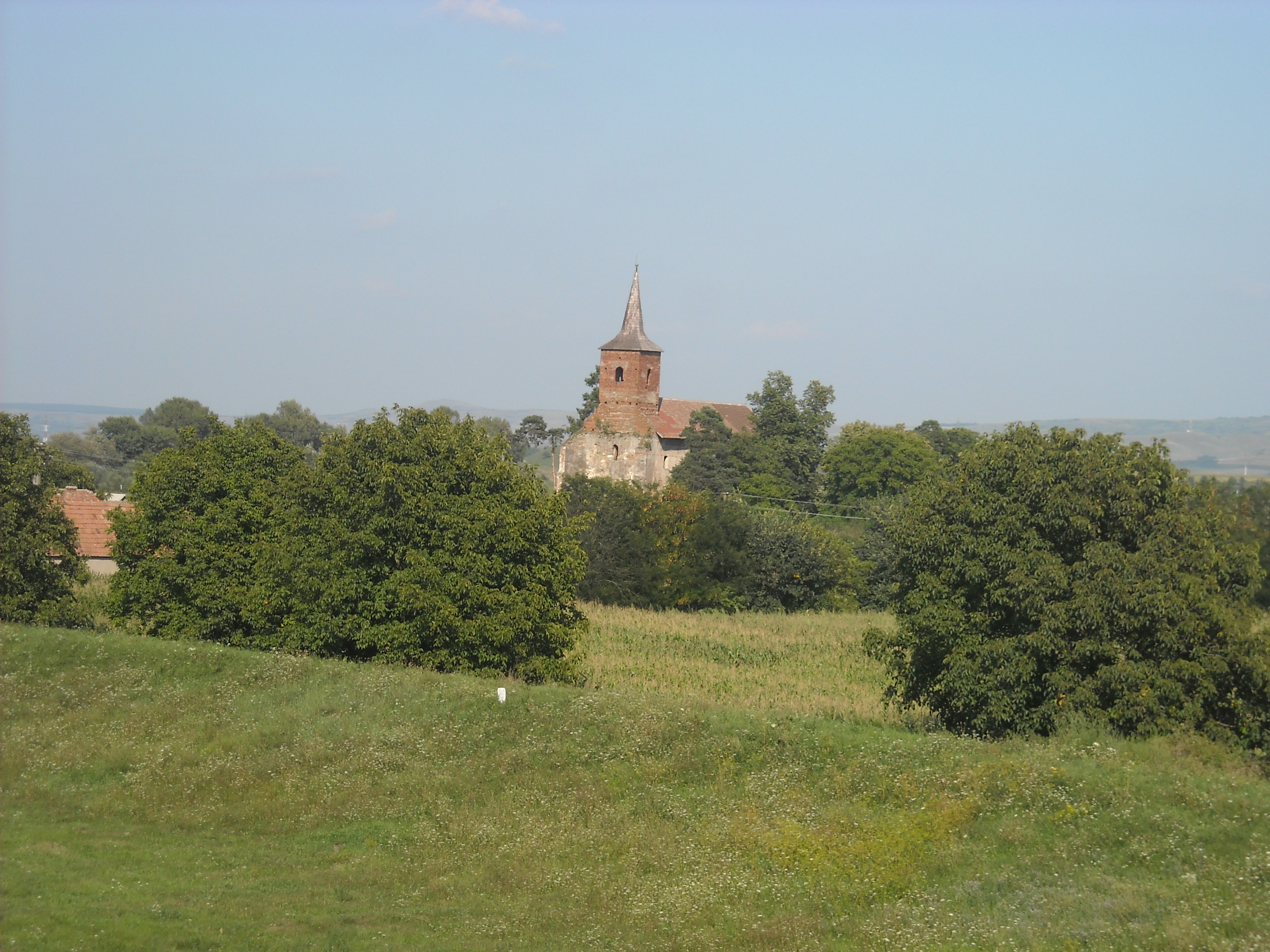
- Reformed church in Vințu de Jos

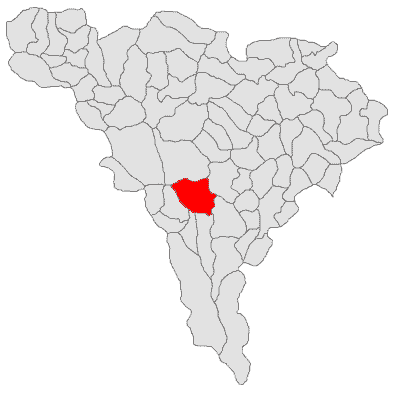
- Location in Alba County

- Location in Romania
- Coordinates: 45°59′N 23°30′E
- Country: Romania
- County: Alba

Government
  - Mayor (2020–2024): Petru-Ioan Barbu (PNL)
- Area: 85.27 km^{2} (32.92 sq mi)
- Elevation: 217 m (712 ft)
- Population (2021-12-01): 4,923
  - Density: 57.73/km^{2} (149.5/sq mi)
- Time zone: UTC+02:00 (EET)
  - Summer (DST): UTC+03:00 (EEST)
- Postal code: 517875
- Area code: (+40) 0258
- Vehicle reg.: AB
- Website: vintudejos.ro

Vințu de Jos, also known as Vinț (German: Unter-Wintz, Winzendorf, Alvinz, Weinsdorf; Hungarian: Alvinc; Latin: Binstum; Turkish: Aşağı Vinçazvar), is a commune located in the centre of Alba County, Transylvania, Romania. It is composed of eighteen villages: Câmpu Goblii (Unter-Eisenberg; Telekvinc), Ciocașu (Zoggesch; Csókás), Crișeni (Krieschen), Dealu Ferului (Eisenberg; Vashegy), Gura Cuțului (Gurrenkutz), Hațegana (Hetzingen), Inuri (Lilienfeld; Borsómező), Laz (Slawendorf), Mătăcina (Mattatschin), Mereteu (Merethof; Merítő), Pârău lui Mihai (Michelsdorf), Poienița (Pojenitz), Stăuini (Stabing), Valea Goblii (Goblsdorf; Goblipatak), Valea lui Mihai (Michaelsdorf), Valea Vințului (Wintzbach; Valye Vinci), Vințu de Jos, and Vurpăr (Burgberg-Walbersdorf; Borberek).

== Geography ==
Vințu de Jos has a surface of 8,527 ha (21,070 acres) and is located on the river Mureș, in the centre of Alba County, approximately 10 km (6.2 mi) from the city of Sebeș on the Romanian National Road DN7, and 15 km (9.3 mi) from the county capital, Alba Iulia on the Romanian County Road 107C and the Romanian National Road DN1.

The commune is bordered by the commune of Meteș to the north, the city of Alba Iulia in the north-east, the city of Sebeș in the south-east, the communes of Pianu and Săliștea in the south, and the commune of Blandiana in the west.

== Economy ==
The centre of the commune, Vințu de Jos, has a large train station and houses a shoe factory. The train station is an important connection station that links the CFR-Romanian Railways main lines 200 and 300 via the line 200A. It is also on the route of the original Orient Express.

== Demographics ==
Historical population
Year	Pop.	±%
1850	4,117	—
1880	4,279	+3.9%
1900	4,936	+15.4%
1920	5,326	+7.9%
1941	5,596	+5.1%
1977	5,773	+3.2%
1992	5,232	−9.4%
2002	5,295	+1.2%
2011	4,801	−9.3%
2021	4,923	+2.5%
Source: Census data

The 2002 census recorded 5,295 people living at the time in the commune, of which 5,108 (96.5%) Romanians, 90 (1.7%) Roma, 76 (1.4%) Hungarians, and 8 (0.2%) Germans. At the 2021 census, Vințu de Jos had a population of 4,923; of those, 91.61% were Romanians.

== Tourist attractions ==
Vințu de Jos' tourist objectives include:

- The Martinuzzi Castle – the ruins of the Renaissance castle where George Martinuzzi was assassinated in 1551.
- The ruins of a former Dominican monastery.
- The ruin of the fortified church of Vurpăr.
- The Monument of Romanian Heroes from World War I, built in 1920.

== Notable people ==
- Stephen Pongracz (1584–1619) a Hungarian Jesuit priest, martyr and saint of the Catholic Church.
- Joseph Alvinczy (1735–1810) a soldier in the Habsburg Army and a Field Marshal of the Austrian Empire.
- Zsigmond Kemény (1814–1875) a Hungarian author.
- János Csató (1833–1913) botanist and ornithologist.
- Lajos Horváth (1872–?) a Hungarian fencer, competed at the 1900 Summer Olympics
