= Peter the Cossack =

Prince of Moldavia
- Reign: August – 25 October 1592
- Predecessor: Aaron the Tyrant
- Successor: Aaron the Tyrant
- Born: unknown
- Died: 25 October 1592; Constantinople
- Dynasty: Bogdan-Mușat
- Father: Alexandru Lăpușneanu (?)
- Religion: Orthodox

Peter VI (also referred to as the Cossack; Romanian: Petru Cazacul; died 1592) was Prince of Moldavia between August 1592 and 25 October 1592.

His nickname comes from his good relation with the Zaporozhian Cossacks.

The data about his origin are uncertain. It is believed that he was the son of Alexandru Lăpuşneanu.

Peter Cossack was killed on 25 October 1592 by strangulation.
