= Martinuzzi Castle =

Coordinates: 45.9972°N 23.4789°E

- Castelul Martinuzzi (Romanian)
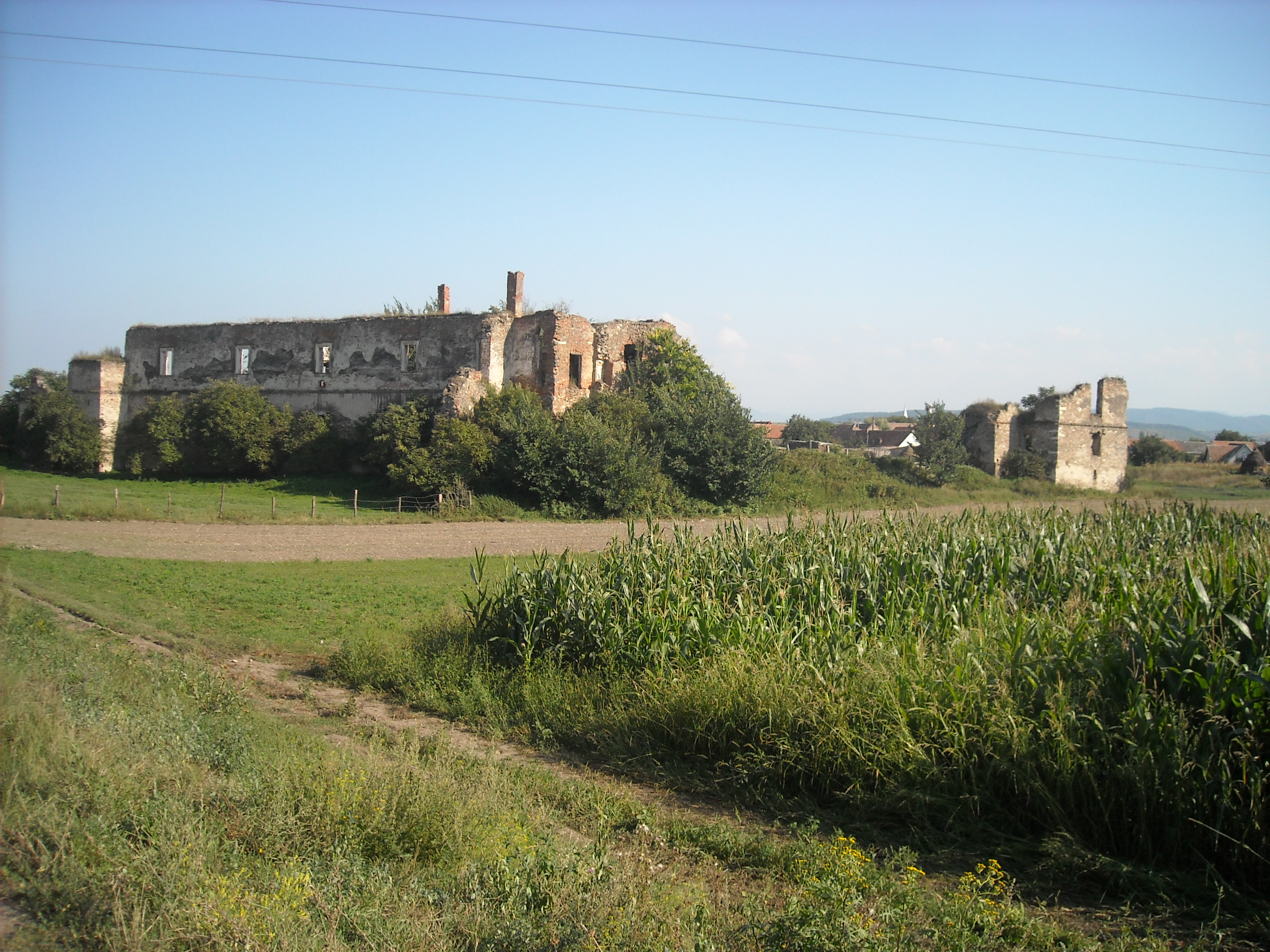
- Martinuzzi Castle ruins

- Location within Alba County
- Location: Vințu de Jos, Alba County, Romania

History
- Built: 13th century
- Built for: Diocese of Transilvania, Erdély, Siebenbürgen

Site notes
- Restored: 1551

Monument istoric
- LMI Code: AB-II-m-B-00394

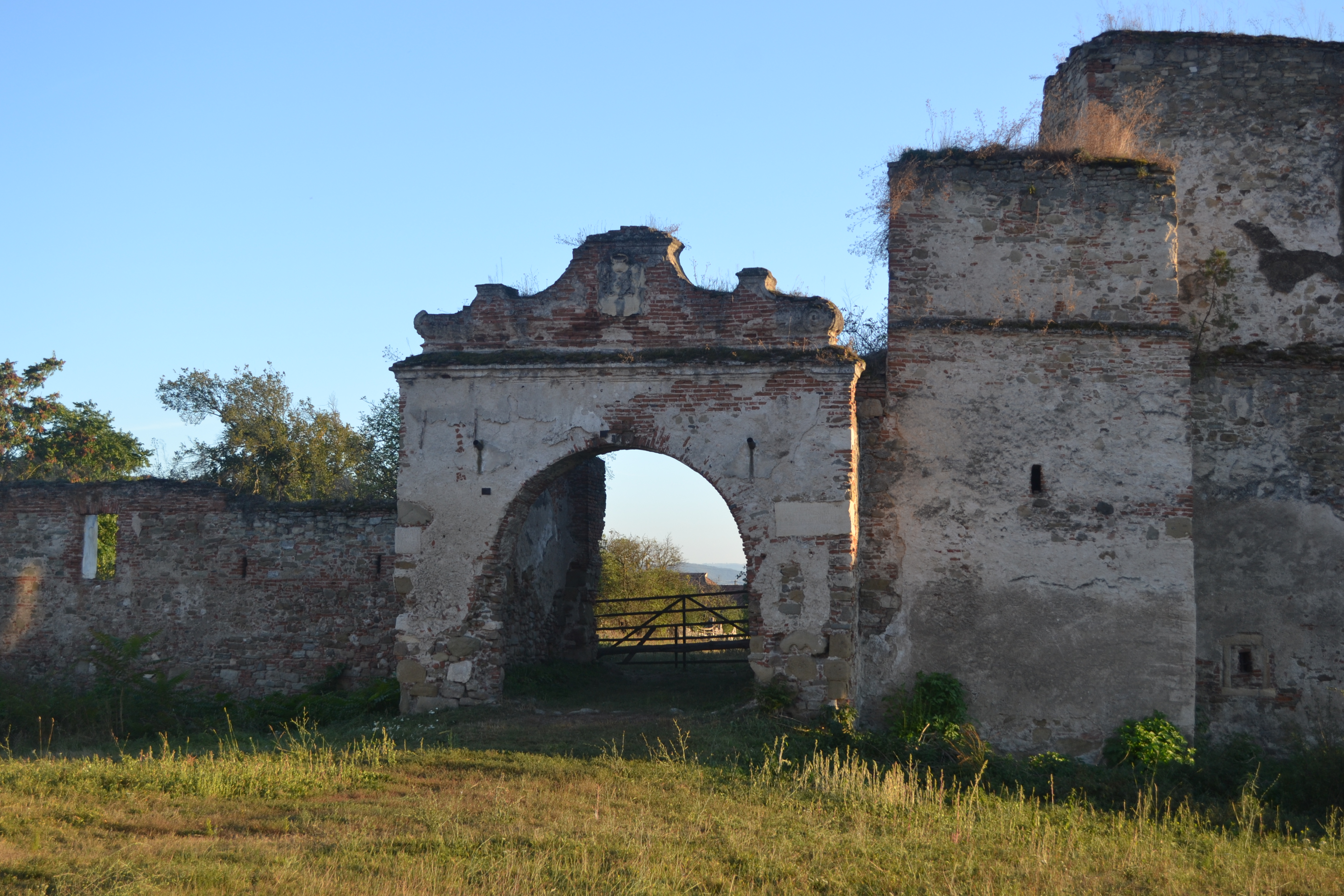
Martinuzzi Castle

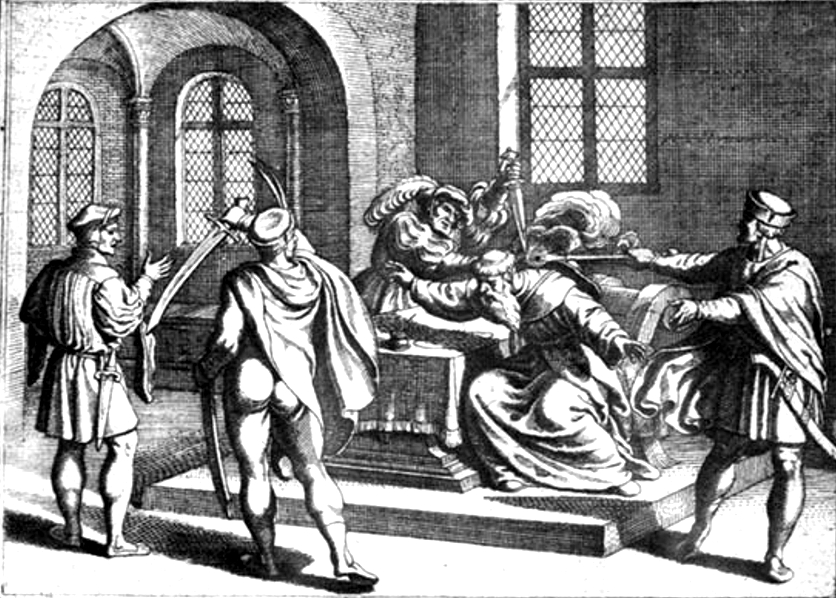
George Martinuzzi was assassinated by General Castaldo within the castle walls in December 1551

Martinuzzi Castle, also known as Alvinc Castle, is a medieval castle in Vințu de Jos, in the Transylvania region of Romania. The fortress was one of the earliest and most influential works of the Italian Renaissance style in Transylvania. Its ruins are classed as a national heritage site, identified as AB-II-m-B-00394 in Romania's National Register of Historic Monuments.

== History ==
=== Notable events ===
In the night of 16–17 December 1551 George Martinuzzi was assassinated within the castle walls by General Giovanni Battista Castaldo.

On 9 May 1595 Aaron the Tyrant was imprisoned and later poisoned here.

In 1601 the Italian architects Simone and Fulvio Genga were accused of political intrigue and assassinated in the castle's dungeons by General Basta.

In 1680, Metropolitan Sava Brancović was imprisoned by Michael I Apafi in the castle's dungeons.

Between 1658 and 1661 the fortress was damaged by Ottoman and Tatar attacks.

In 1715 the castle was owned by Transylvania's Roman Catholic Church, functioning as episcopal summer residence. In 1792, while occupied by Ignác Batthyány, the property caught fire and was later repaired.

During Romania's communist rule, the castle continued to deteriorate, having been used as industrial storage, granary and as a meat processing plant. Northern parts of the structure collapsed in 1981.

After the Romanian Revolution, the castle was abandoned and the ruins are facing imminent collapse.

== Mythology ==
Oral tradition suggests that Castaldo assassinated Martinuzzi in an attempt to recover a stash of ancient coins, which the cardinal was rumoured to have acquired from local fisherman and hidden in the castle.
