= Doamna Velica =

Romanian noble

Velica (fl. 1601) was a Romanian noble. She was the influential royal mistress and favorite of Michael the Brave in 1595–1601. Historian Nicolae Iorga referred to her as the "master of Transylvania through love".

She was the daughter of Ioan Norocea and Stana, and married to the Italian noble Fabio Genga, a favorite of Sigismund Báthory. She served as interpreter during the visit of Michael the Brave to Sigismund Báthory in 1595, and accompanied him with her husband to Alba Iulia, where she became the official mistress of Michael. Their relationship was regarded a scandal. On 15 March 1600, an imperial agent reported that her influence was so great that she had all the affairs of the state in her hands, and that her husband was banned from having any intercourse with her by Michael. After the murder of Michael in August 1601, there is no further mention of her.
