= Pochidia =

- Commune
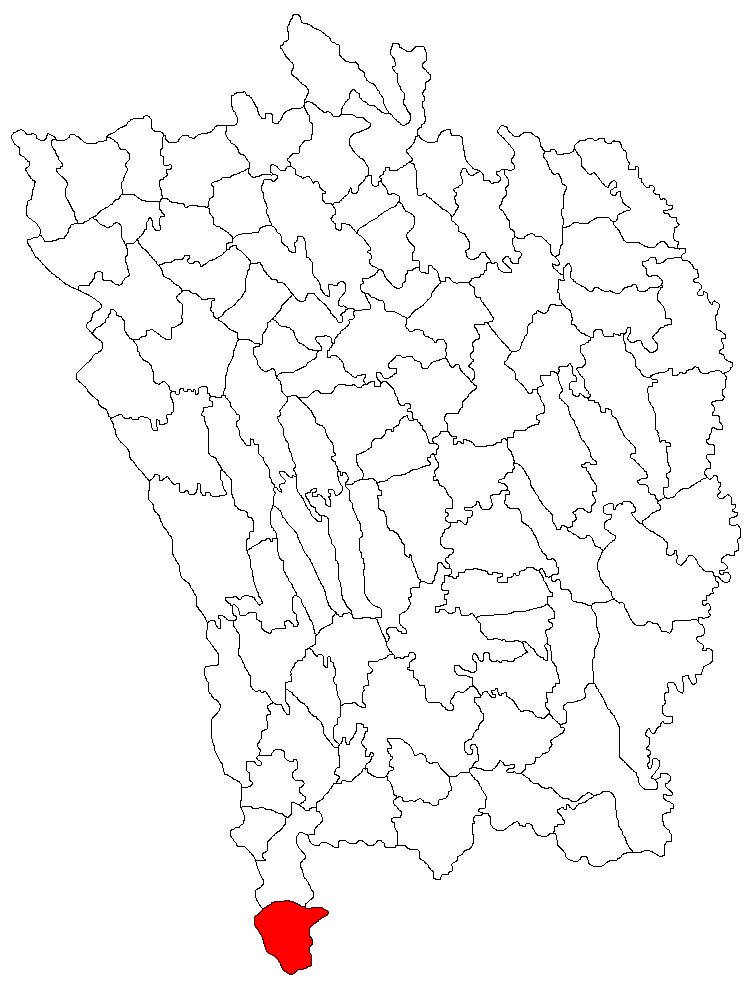
- Location in Vaslui County

- Location in Romania
- Coordinates: 46°03′N 27°35′E
- Country: Romania
- County: Vaslui
- Population (2021-12-01): 1,575
- Time zone: EET/EEST (UTC+2/+3)
- Vehicle reg.: VS

Pochidia is a commune in Vaslui County, Western Moldavia, Romania. It is composed of four villages: Borodești, Pochidia, Satu Nou and Sălceni. These were part of Tutova Commune until 2004, when they were split off.
