= Pogonești =

- Commune
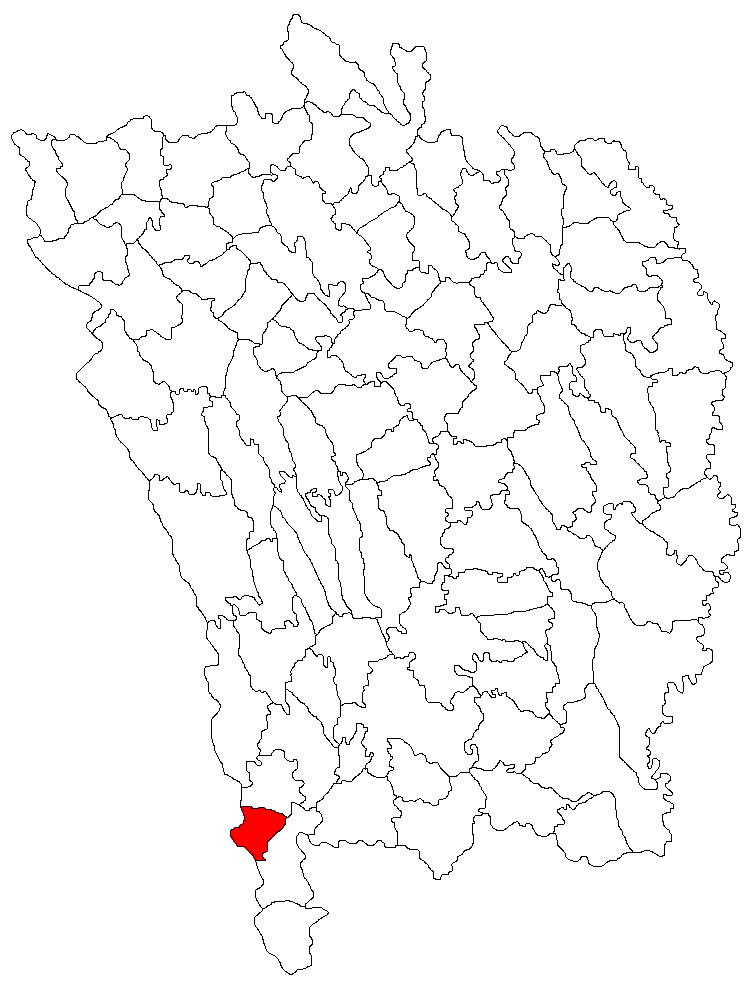
- Location in Vaslui County

- Location in Romania
- Coordinates: 46°09′N 27°32′E
- Country: Romania
- County: Vaslui
- Population (2021-12-01): 1,430
- Time zone: EET/EEST (UTC+2/+3)
- Vehicle reg.: VS

Pogonești is a commune in Vaslui County, Western Moldavia, Romania. It is composed of three villages: Belcești, Pogonești and Polocin. These were part of Ivești Commune until 2004, when they were split off.
