= Aroneanu =

- Commune
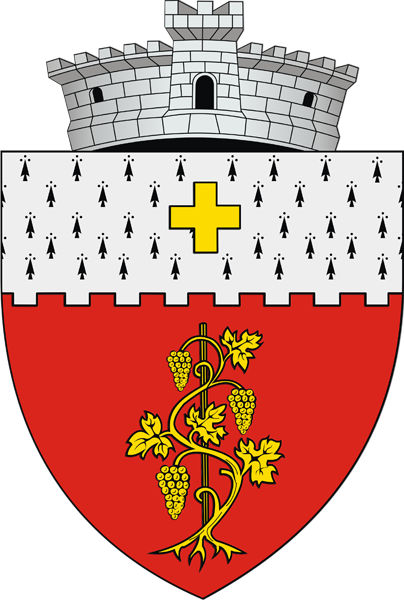
- Coat of arms

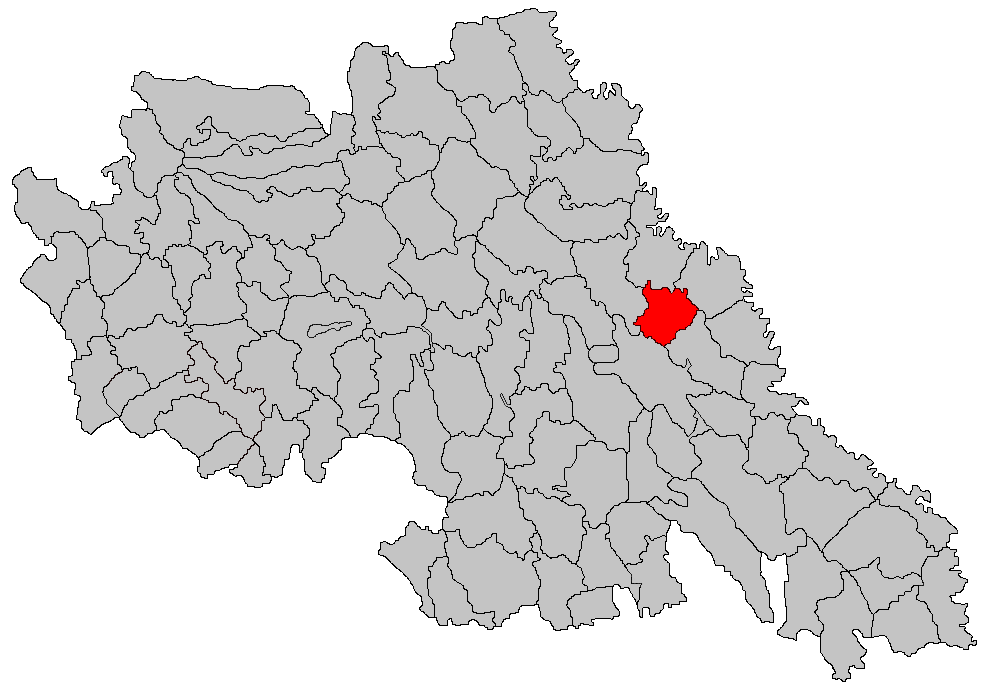
- Location in Iași County

- Location in Romania
- Coordinates: 47°12′N 27°36′E
- Country: Romania
- County: Iași
- Subdivisions: Aroneanu, Dorobanț, Rediu Aldei, Șorogari

Government
  - Mayor (2024–2028): Benoni Moruzi (PNL)
- Area: 39.03 km^{2} (15.07 sq mi)
- Elevation: 117 m (384 ft)
- Population (2021-12-01): 4,338
  - Density: 110/km^{2} (290/sq mi)
- Time zone: EET/EEST (UTC+2/+3)
- Postal code: 707020
- Area code: +40 x32
- Vehicle reg.: IS
- Website: comunaaroneanu.ro

Aroneanu is a commune in Iași County, Western Moldavia, Romania, part of the Iași metropolitan area. It is composed of four villages: Aroneanu, Dorobanț, Rediu Aldei and Șorogari.
