= Solomon Ashkenazi =

Jewish physician and businessman

Solomon ben Nathan Ashkenazi (c. 1520 – 1602) was a Jewish physician and businessman active in Ottoman, Venetian and Polish–Lithuanian politics during the late 16th century. Ashkenazi wielded considerable influence, most famously helping bring about the Jews' readmission to Venice in 1573.

== Early life and migration ==
Ashkenazi was born in Udine to Jewish parents of German origin. He studied medicine at the University of Padua and trained as a rabbi. Following the expulsion of the Jews from Udine in 1556, Ashkenazi traveled to Kraków, Poland to serve as chief physician to King Sigismund II Augustus. In 1564 Ashkenazi left for a post as court physician in Constantinople.

== Court physician in Constantinople ==
In Constantinople, Ashkenazi rose to prominence, befriending the Venetian Bailo Marcantonio Barbaro and the Ottoman Grand Vizier Mehmed Sokollu. He and his brother also became involved in the wine trade between Crete and Poland, centered in Constantinople, as did many Jews of the time. The outbreak of the Ottoman-Venetian War in 1570 turned Ashkenazi into a key intermediary party between the Ottoman Empire and Venice. Ashkenazi held two posts during the war: royal physician to Sokollu’s wife and official physician to the Venetian community in Constantinople. He carried out secret orders from the Grand Vizier intended to bring about peace, preventing arrests of military leaders and carrying messages between the two sides. Together with the Grand Dragoman Ali Bey, Ashkenazi drafted the peace treaty that ended the war in 1573.

Ashkenazi was instrumental in choosing a successor for the Polish King Sigismund II Augustus, who left no heir upon his death in 1572. Polish law required an election be held. The candidates included the Russian tsar Ivan the Terrible; the German emperor Maximilian II; the Pope's nominee, a minor Catholic prince; and the French prince, Henri of Anjou. The entire Europe balance of power was in limbo. Despite ostensibly belonging to the Polish gentry, the choice of the next Polish king effectively rested in the hands of the Ottoman Porte, whose sphere of influence extended into Poland. A French ambassador traveled to Constantinople to win the endorsement of Ottoman leaders. He met with Ashkenazi, convincing him a French king of Poland was necessary to maintain the balance of power; in turn, Ashkenazi persuaded the Grand Vizier to back Henri. After Henri ascended the Polish throne, Ashkenazi sent the king his congratulations, writing, "I have rendered your majesty most important service in securing your election: I have effected all that was done here."

== Readmission of Venetian Jews ==
In 1572, the Venetian Doge, Alvise I Mocenigo, called for the re-enforcement of the 1556 decree of expulsion, inciting many Jews to leave and igniting a contentious debate in the Senate. The Jews’ involvement in foreign trade and pawn-broking made them vital economic assets to the Venetian city-state. Moreover, some Venetian citizens objected morally to the replacement of Jewish banks with the Christian Monte di Pietà, an up-and-coming institution in Venetian towns. At the same time, others argued that Jewish expulsion was a matter of moral necessity, citing the banishment of Jews from Spain and Portugal.

Back in Constantinople, Ashkenazi used his contacts to exert political pressure on the Venetian authorities on the issue of Jewish expulsion. Through an arrangement with Jacopo Soranzo, a Venetian official in Constantinople, Ashkenazi had arranged for some expelled Venetian Jews to come to the Ottoman Empire. Soranzo returned to Venice shortly afterward to warn the Senate of the threat inherent in that arrangement. The Jews living presently in the Ottoman Empire, he explained, who had been expelled earlier from Spain and Portugal, now manufactured weapons for the Ottoman forces to use against Venice. To add onto them Jews expelled from Venice could be costly or even dangerous. Ashkenazi made similar arguments to Barbaro, who relayed them to the Doge in his dispatches on the Ottoman situation

These factors doubtless contributed to the Senate’s decision to readmit the Jews in December 1573. But it would be fallacious to attribute full credit to Ashkenazi. Another proposal presented to the Venetian Senate earlier that year suggested the Jews expelled from Spain and Portugal be permitted entry, provided they lived in ghettos. While that proposal did not pass, it served to remind the Senate of the economic importance of the Jews and likely contributed to their ultimate readmission

== Ambassador to Venice ==
Following the Polish election, the Porte named Ashkenazi envoy to Venice. Controversy flamed on both sides about the appointment of a Jew. In Ottoman Empire, Sokollu vouched for the doctor’s political acumen, while in Venice Barbaro sung Ashkenazi’s praises. After some debate, Ashkenazi won the seat and travelled to Venice in May 1574.

The Venetian authorities and Jewish community showered Ashkenazi with gifts upon his arrival. As Ottoman ambassador, his track record proved mixed. Ashkenazi successfully negotiated a dispute over the borders of Dalmatia, but failed in his advocacy for the formation of a Venetian-Ottoman military alliance. While in Venice he also helped a group of Jewish merchants petition for compensation for the property they lost after leaving Venice because of the banishment decree. The petition succeeded and the merchants were compensated; many nonetheless chose not to return to Venice.

== Return to Constantinople and death ==
Ashkenazi returned to Constantinople in July 1574, remaining active in politics until Sokollu's death in 1579. He managed his financial affairs poorly and died in poverty in 1602.
