= Trifon Korobeynikov =

16th-century Russian merchant and traveller

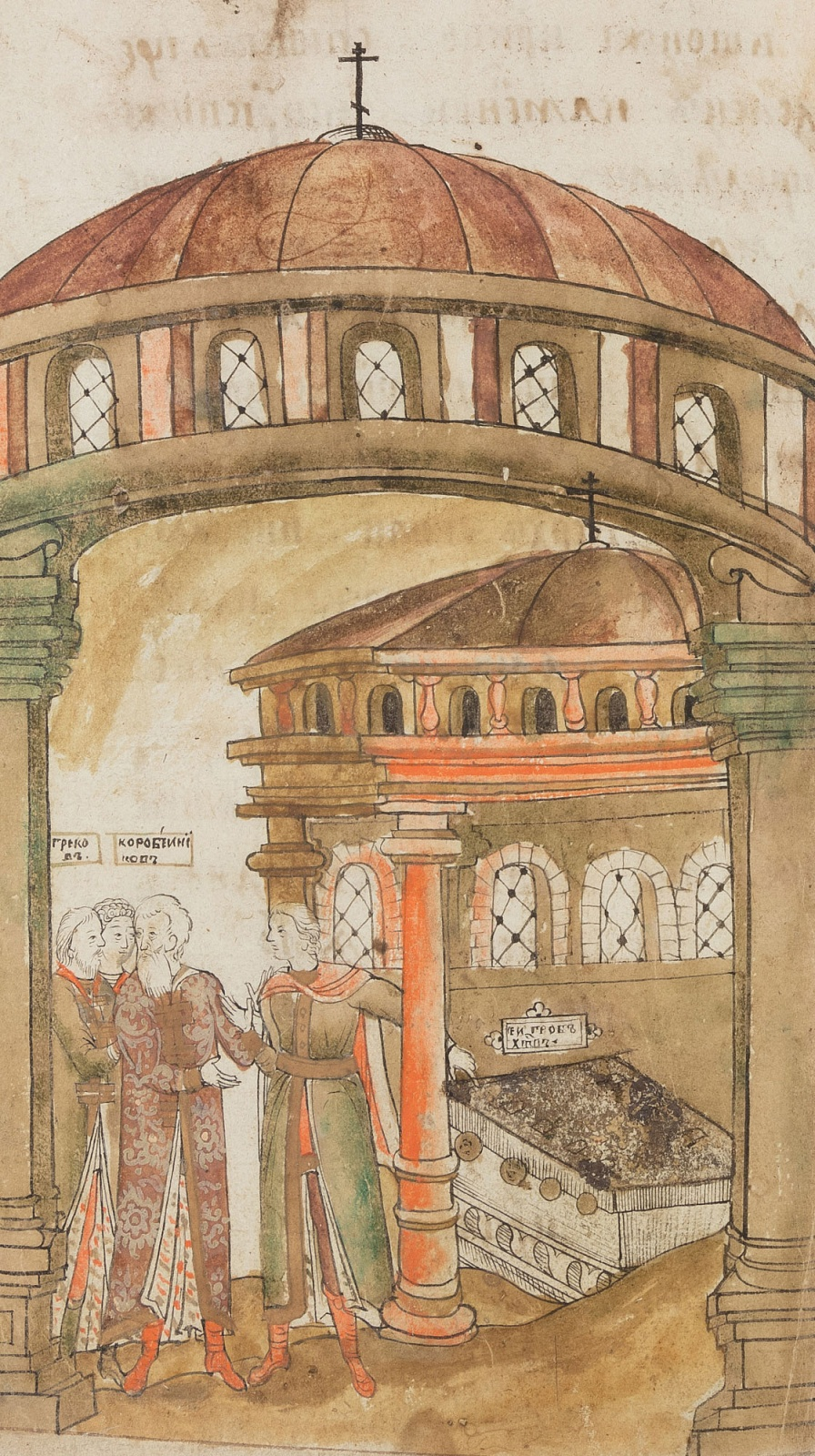

Trifon Korobeynikov (Russian: Трифон Коробейников; died after 1594) was a 16th-century merchant and traveller from Moscow.

Korobeynikov made two visits to Palestine, Mount Athos and İstanbul, in 1582-84 and 1594-94 on assignments of tsars Ivan IV and Feodor I.

His account of his travels was published in 1594, as Описание пути от Москвы до Царьграда ("Description of the journey from Moscow to Constantinople") Also in 1594, he also co-authored a Moscow government report (Russian: Отчет московскому правительству) on financial affairs.

His travel account was re-published in 1783, under the title of "The Travels of a Moscow Merchant, Trifon Korobeynikov, and His Comrades to Jerusalem, Egypt, and Mount Sinai in 1583" (Трифона Коробейникова, московского купца, с товарищи, путешествие во Иерусалим, Египет и к Синайской горе в 1583 г.) and was frequently reprinted (Saint Petersburg: 1786, 1803, 1810, 1834, 1837, 1838, 1841, 1846, 1847, Moscow 1851, 1852, 1853, 1854, 1859, 1866, 1869, 1870, 1871, 1873, 1874, 1875, 1876, 1878, 1879, 1881, 1882, 1886, 1888).
