= George Martinuzzi =

16th-century Croatian Catholic nobleman, cardinal, and statesman

His Eminence George Martinuzzi O.S.P.P.E.
- Archbishop of Esztergom; Primate of Hungary
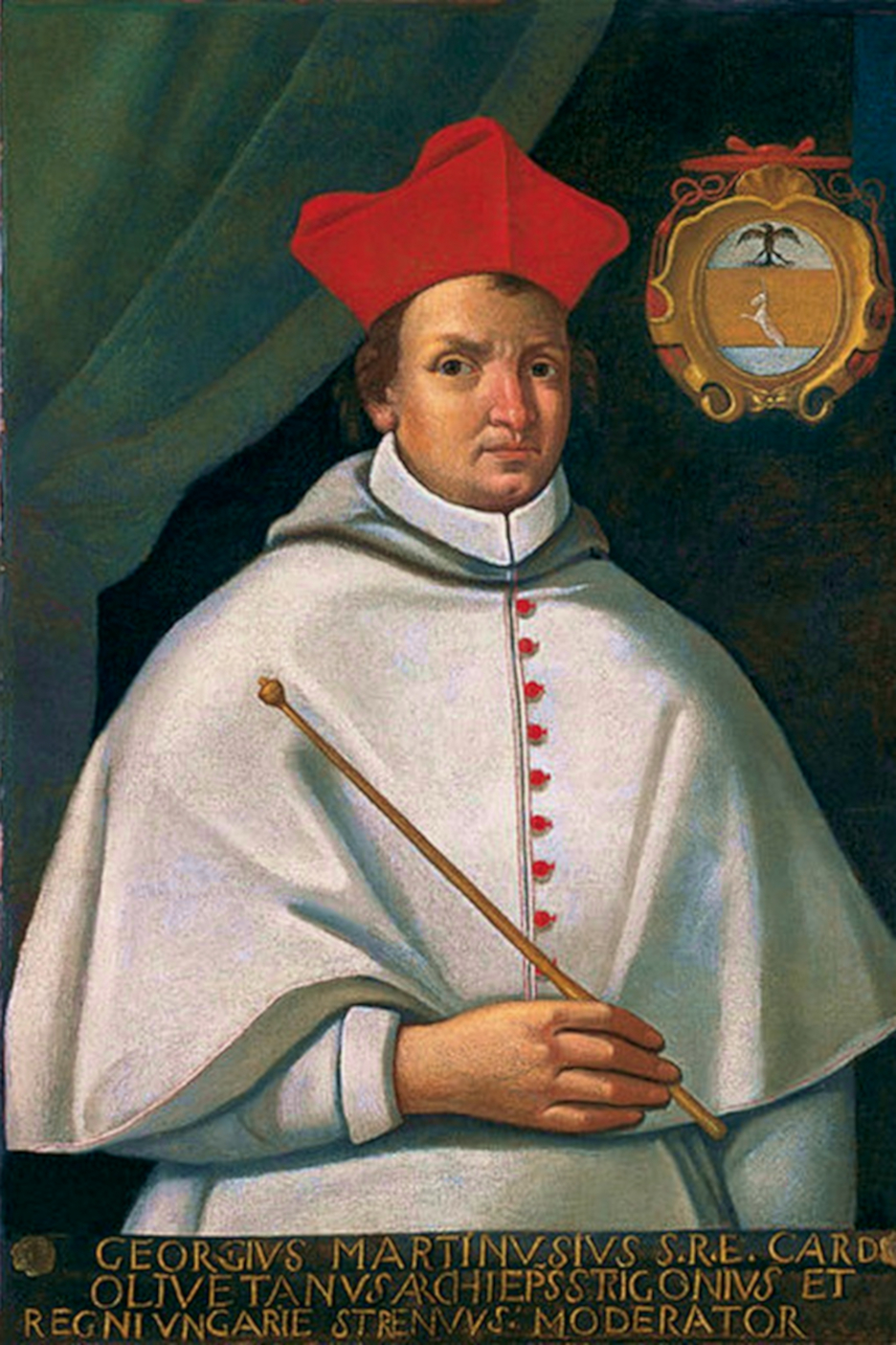
- Archdiocese: Archdiocese of Esztergom
- Installed: 1551
- Term ended: 1551
- Previous posts: Bishop of Nagyvárad (1534-51); Voivode of Transylvania (1551)

Orders
- Ordination: 1510
- Consecration: 1548 by Franjo Jožefić (Bishop of Senj)
- Created cardinal: 12 October 1551 by Pope Julius III

Personal details
- Born: 1482 Kamičak, Kingdom of Croatia (today Skradin area, Croatia)
- Died: 16 December 1551 (aged 68–69) Nagycsanád, Eastern Hungarian Kingdom (now Cenad, Romania)
- Buried: St. Michael's Cathedral, Alba Iulia

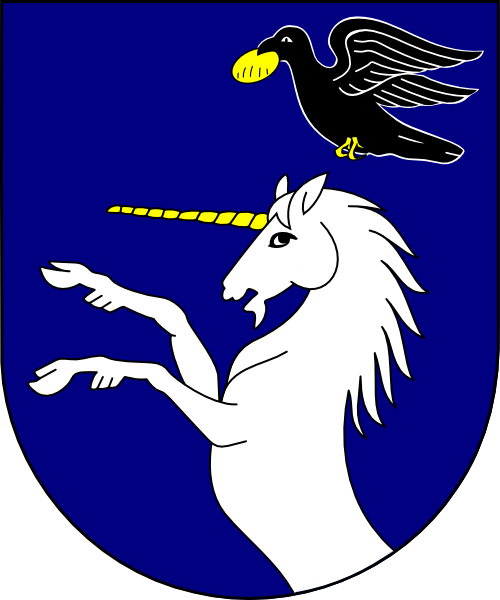
- Coat of arms

George Martinuzzi, O.S.P.P.E. (born Juraj Utješenović, also known as György Martinuzzi, Brother György, Georg Utiessenovicz-Martinuzzi or György Fráter, Hungarian: Fráter György; 1482 – 16 December 1551), was a Croatian nobleman, Pauline monk and Hungarian statesman who supported King John Zápolya and his son, King John Sigismund Zápolya. He was Bishop of Nagyvárad (now Oradea), Archbishop of Esztergom and a cardinal.

== Name ==
Since he usually identified himself as "Frater Georgius", he is known in Hungarian history as "Fráter György".

== Early years ==
Most details of Martinuzzi's life before 1528 are uncertain. He was the youngest son of a Croatian lesser nobleman, Grgur Utješenović, and Anna Martinuzzi, who was descended from a Venetian patrician family. He was born in Kamičak Castle, near Skradin, on 18 June 1482. On the father's side, he is originating from a Hungarian noble family (Fráter from Dobra genus). He was still a child when his father and his two oldest brothers died and the Ottomans occupied the family estates. Duke John Corvinus took care of the orphan in 1490. Martinuzzi was sent to Corvin's castle at Hunyad (now Hunedoara in Romania). He lived in wretched conditions for years, because young noblemen were intentionally treated like servants for pedagogical purposes.

Martinuzzi moved to the court of Hedwig of Cieszyn in Szepes Castle (now Spiš Castle in Slovakia) around 1503. She was the widow of his father's patron, Count Stephen Zápolya. Initially, he served as a page, then he was made a guard of the palace. He decided to abandon his military career and entered the Pauline Order at the age of 24. He most probably settled in the Budaszentlőrinc Monastery where he learnt to read and write. He was sent to continue his studies in the Jasna Góra Monastery in Częstochowa. He was made the head of the monastery, according to unproved theories. After he returned to Hungary in 1527, he became the prior of the Sajólád Monastery, which had recently received grants from the Zápolyas.

Martinuzzi's sister, Ana, married Bartol Drašković and had three sons (one of whom was Croatian Ban (viceroy) and cardinal Juraj Drašković).

== Political career ==
=== John Zápolya's supporter ===
The Ottoman Sultan Suleiman the Magnificent annihilated the Hungarian royal army in the Battle of Mohács on 29 August 1526. King Louis II of Hungary drowned in a stream fleeing from the battlefield. The Diet of Hungary elected the wealthy Count John Zápolya—the son of Martinuzzi's patroness, Hedwig—king in November, but the most powerful barons ignored this decision and proclaimed Ferdinand of Habsburg the lawful monarch in December. A civil war broke out and a supporter of Ferdinand, Gáspár Serédy, pillaged the Sajólád Monastery shortly before Martinuzzi returned to Hungary.

Ferdinand's troops defeated John in the Battle of Szina (near present-day Seňa in Slovakia) on 8 March 1528. John decided to flee to Poland and wanted to lodge a part of his wealth at the Sajólád Monastery. Martinuzzi denied to store John's property, but he accompanied the king to Poland. He acted as John's personal envoy and visited Hungary three times to convince the expelled king's supporters—including Stephen Báthory of Somlyó, Jakab Tornallyai and Pál Ártándy—to remain loyal to him. Suleiman acknowledged John as the lawful king. The sultan's support enabled him to return to Hungary and seize the eastern and central territories of the kingdom by the end of 1529, but he could not reunite Hungary.

Martinuzzi came back with John to Hungary, but the details of his life from 1529 to 1532 are unknown. The king made Alvise Gritti—a Venetian adventurer who was the favourite of the Ottoman Grand Vizier, Pargalı Ibrahim Pasha—governor of Hungary. Gritti appointed Martinuzzi the provisor of Buda Castle, entrusting him with the administration of the royal demesne in 1532. Gritti's other henchman, János Dóczy, murdered the popular bishop of Várad (now Oradea in Romania), Imre Czibak, in August 1534. The crime outraged the bishop's relatives and supporters who captured and killed Gritti on 28 September. Martinuzzi did not lose the king's favor. He succeeded Gritti as royal treasurer and the king also made him the new bishop of Várad. The bishops of Várad were also the ispáns (or heads) of Bihar County.

The consolidation of the royal treasury was Martinuzzi's principal task during the subsequent years. He centralized the administration of royal revenues and secured the regular investigation of the tax collectors' activities. Trading in leather, fleece, wine and grain became a significant source of income for the royal treasury in the late 1530s. The strict control of state revenues caused many conflicts and Martinuzzi was often accused of greed. Tamás Nádasdy deserted John Zápolya for Ferdinand of Habsburg after Martinuzzi deprived him of the administration of the salt mines in Máramaros County in 1534.

The noblemen urged both kings to reach a compromise, because the civil war had caused much devastation in the whole kingdom. John and Ferdinand's envoys started negotiations about the reunification of the country in 1534, but Martinuzzi was actually involved in the process only in 1536. In this year, Ferdinand's emissary, Johann von Wese, noted that the "White Monk" (Martinuzzi) had taken full control of the negotiations. Martinuzzi wanted to reach an agreement, but he could also prove himself determined to refute any compromise in order to strengthen John's position during the negotiations, especially after a new war broke out between Ferdinand's brother, Emperor Charles V, and King Francis I of France. Wese personally came to Várad to meet with Martinuzzi and Franjo Frankopan in November 1537. Martinuzzi hinted that he was willing to support Ferdinand and proudly claimed that he was the only politician to be able to mediate between the "Ottomans, Serbians, Moldavians, Wallachians and Hungarians", according to Wese's notes. After a series of clandestine negotiations, they drafted an agreement on 24 February 1538. The secret Treaty of Várad acknowledged the provisional division of Hungary between János and Ferdinand, but it also prescribed that the kingdom was to be reunited as soon as one of the two kings died.

Both king signed the treaty, but they kept it in secret, because they knew that it could provoke an Ottoman invasion. John soon realized that Ferdinand was unable to effectively support him against the Ottomans. Martinuzzi started emphasizing that the treaty could be regarded valid only after the Diet enacted it and prevented the most powerful barons from confirming it. He also urged the elderly John to marry Isabella Jagiellon, the daughter of King Sigismund I of Poland. She was crowned queen in Székesfehérvár on 2 March 1539. Pope Paul III confirmed Martinuzzi's appointment to the see of Várad in the same year, but Martinuzzi was not ordained bishop.

The two voivodes (or royal governors) of Transylvania, Imre Balassa and István Majláth, concluded a secret agreement with the leading Transylvanian lords in December 1539. They agreed to support each other and to coordinate their activities if the ailing king died, but their actual objectives are unclear. The voivodes held a general assembly in Marosvásárhely (now Târgu Mureș in Romania) in March 1540. The delegates accused Martinuzzi of tyranny, stating that his officials had levied arbitrary taxes and unlawfully forced the Transylvanian noblemen to contribute to the erection and maintenance of royal fortresses. They summarized their grievances in a letter and urged the king to punish Martinuzzi.

King John hurried to Transylvania and held a new assembly at Torda (now Turda in Romania) in April. He stood by his treasurer, emphasizing that Martinuzzi had levied taxes to secure the paying of the annual tribute to the Ottoman Empire. The king also pledged that the royal treasury would pay the tribute without collecting extraordinary taxes for two years. The two voivodes' former supporters paid homage to the king and the general assembly sentenced Majláth to death for high treason in May. Majláth fled to his castle at Fogaras (now Făgăraș in Romania) and the royal army could not capture the strong fortress.

=== Ottoman conquest ===
Queen Isabella gave birth to a son, John Sigismund, in Buda on 7 July. King John was staying in Szászsebes (now Sebeș in Romania) when he learnt of his son's birth. The celebrations put too much strain on the king who fell seriously ill. He appointed his relative, Péter Petrovics, and Martinuzzi to be John Sigismund's guardians, emphasizing Martinuzzi's preeminent position. Ignoring the provisions of the Treaty of Várad, the king also urged his supporters to elect the infant John Sigismund king after his death. John soon lost consciousness and Martinuzzi sent envoys to Sigismund I of Poland and Suleiman, asking them to support John Sigismund.

King John died on 22 July. Franjo Frankopan, Péter Perényi, Ferenc Bebek, István Ráskay and Martinuzzi's other personal enemies informed Charles V that they were willing to support Ferdinand I to reunite Hungary if the emperor promised to provide military assistance to his brother against the Ottomans. Martinuzzi and Bálint Török left Szászsebes for Buda, accompanied by 2000 troops. Most of their retainers deserted, but Ferdinand's supporters could not prevent them from reaching the capital. Martinuzzi had appointed Boldizsár Bornemissza to administer Transylvania, but Balassa and Majláth convened the general assembly of the Three Nations of Transylvania at Segesvár (now Sighișoara in Romania). The delegates elected Balassa and Majláth the supreme commanders of the province. They soon expelled Martinuzzi's troops from about 4 fortresses, including Görgény and Almás (now Gurghiu and Merișor in Romania).

Martinuzzi hastily convened the Diet at Pest and persuaded the delegates to elect John Sigismund king in mid-September. The Diet proclaimed Queen Isabella and Martinuzzi the king's guardians, but state administration was divided between Martinuzzi, Petrovics and Török. After Martinuzzi garrisoned his own retainers in Buda Castle, gossips about his attempts to seize full control of the government were spreading in the queen's court. He regularly checked queen's correspondence with her father, because he feared that Sigismund I of Poland could convince her to leave Hungary.

The sultan's envoy, Çavuş Sinan, tried to persuade the delegates of the Three Nations to acknowledge Mailáth as the voivode of Transylvania at Berethalom (now Biertan in Romania) in September. They resisted and decided to postpone Mailath's installation for five months. Martinuzzi sent István Werbőczy to Istanbul to secure the sultan's support. Suleiman decided to intervene in the conflict on behalf of the infant John Sigismund. Ferdinand's envoys, Elek Thurzó and Ferenc Révay, came to Buda in October, but the queen did not abandon John Sigismund's claim to Hungary. Martinuzzi also refuted to start secret negotiations with Thurzó and Révay in Visegrád. Ferdinand's troops seized Visegrád, Vác, Tata, Székesfehérvár and Pest in October and November, but they could not capture Buda. Martinuzzi again refused to negotiate with Ferdinand's envoys, stating that he was willing to obey only to a monarch who had been elected by common consent.

Mehmed, the Ottoman governor of Belgrade, made a raid around Pest in March 1541. Ferdinand's commander, Wilhelm von Roggendorf, laid siege to Buda in May. Ferdinand's envoy, Niklas zu Salm, offered the region of Pressburg and Nagyszombat (now Bratislava and Trnava in Slovakia) to John Sigismund in return for Buda, but Martinuzzi refused. Martinuzzi personally participated in the defense of Buda Castle when the besiegers made a sudden assault on 11 June. Two days later, he ordered the persecution of a burgher who entered into secret negotiations with the besiegers about the surrender of the castle.

John Zápolya named Martinuzzi and Péter Petrovics guardians of his infant son John II Sigismund, who was elected King of Hungary by the Diet (with Martinuzzi as regent). Martinuzzi frustrated attempts by dowager queen Isabella Jagiellon to promote Ferdinand; the latter, contending that John II's election had violated the treaty, invaded Hungary, and an Austrian army reached the walls of Buda in 1541.

=== Governor ===
Martinuzzi took two drastic steps in response: he arrested the queen and appealed to the Ottoman Empire for help. John Zápolya had requested Ottoman aid against Ferdinand; in return, Hungary was an Ottoman vassal state, and Martinuzzi asked Ottoman Sultan Suleiman to defend his vassal against attack. An Ottoman army repulsed the Austrians.

On 28 August 1541 Martinuzzi, the queen, and the infant king went to the Ottoman camp, where he paid homage to the sultan as regent. During their absence, the Ottoman Grand Vizier seized Buda by subterfuge, causing Martinuzzi to realize the need for accords with Austria and the Ottoman Empire. This led to the 29 December 1541 Treaty of Gyalu, in which Ferdinand received western Hungary; the Eastern Hungarian Kingdom (an independent principality under Ottoman suzerainty) was reverted to John Sigismund. This region included many Hungarian counties on both sides of the Tisza and the city of Kassa (now Košice). Martinuzzi's policy was to keep the state neutral (and intact) by cultivating amicable relations with Austria without offending the Ottomans. Although this was difficult, it succeeded for a time.

Encouraged by Ferdinand's growing unpopularity (due to his inability to defend Hungary against the Turks), in 1545 Martinuzzi, to ensure John Sigismund's election as king, wanted to unite Habsburg Kingdom of Hungary and Eastern Hungarian Kingdom. Realizing that this was impossible, he aimed at an alliance with Ferdinand on terms of relative equality (a policy he followed until his death).

In 1550 Queen Isabella (who opposed Martinuzzi) complained about him to the Sultan, who ordered that Martinuzzi or his head be sent to Constantinople. A coalition formed against Martinuzzi composed of the queen, the hospodars of Moldavia and Wallachia, and the Turks. The regent imprisoned the queen in Gyulafehérvár (now Alba Iulia), drove the hospodars out of Transylvania, and defeated the Turks at Déva (now Deva). He compelled Isabella to accept terms with Ferdinand advantageous to her family and Transylvania, and placated the sultan with flattery and gifts. This agreement was confirmed by the diet of Kolozsvár (now Cluj-Napoca) in August 1551; Martinuzzi remained governor of Transylvania, and was ordained Archbishop of Esztergom. On 12 October 1551 Pope Julius III named him a cardinal, with permission to wear the habit of his order instead of a cardinal's robes.

Although Hungary was again reunited, Ferdinand's inability to defend it against the Ottomans forced Martinuzzi to resume the payment of tribute to the sultan in December 1551. However, the Ottomans no longer trusted a diplomat whose behavior they could not understand, and Ferdinand suspected him of wanting to secure Hungary for himself.

== Death ==
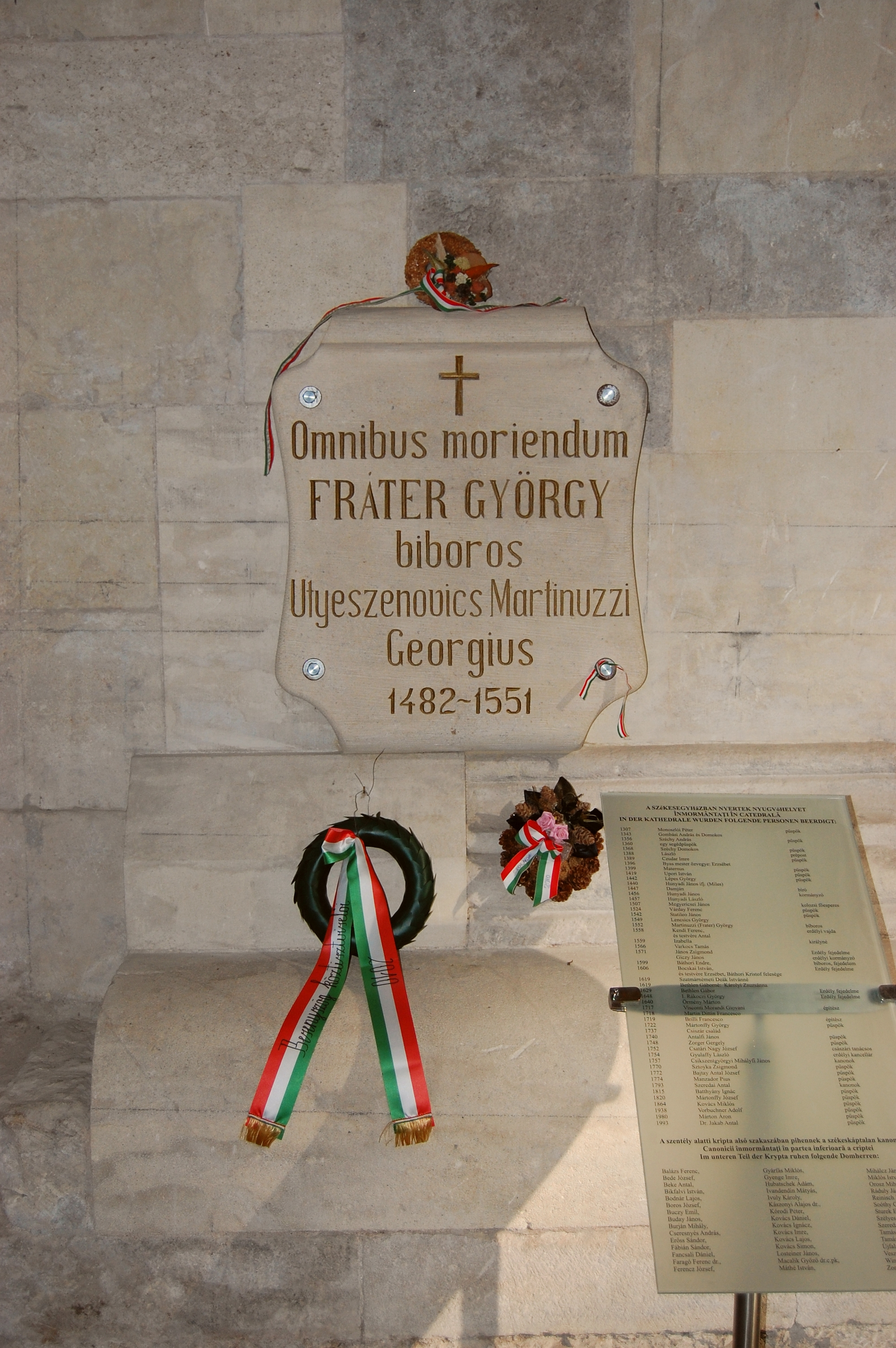
Utješenović's grave in Alba Iulia Cathedral

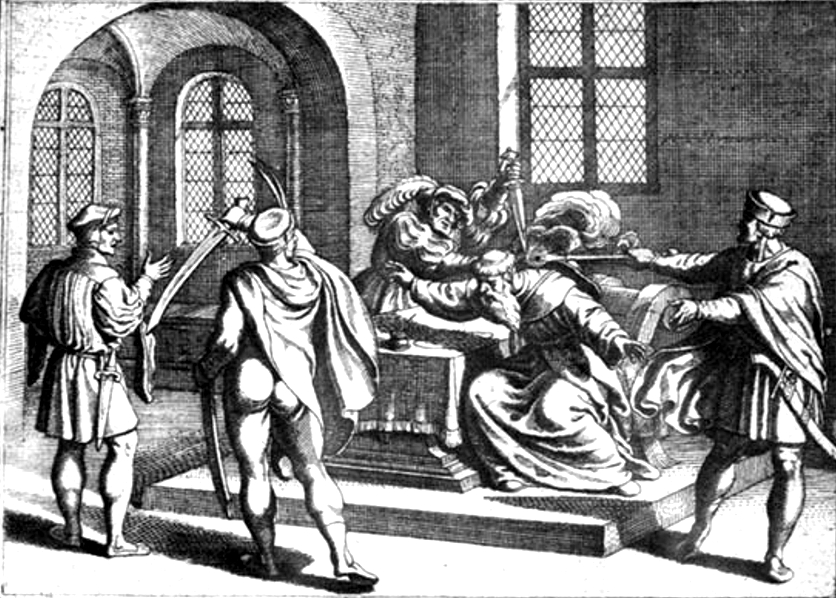
Martinuzzi's assassination, by agents of Giambattista Castaldo, on 16 December 1551

When the Ottomans seized Csanád (now Cenad) in 1551, Martinuzzi and imperial generals Giambattista Castaldo and Sforza-Pallavicini joined forces against a common foe. However, when Martinuzzi tried to mediate privately between the Ottomans and the Hungarians, Castaldo accused him of treason to Ferdinand and was given permission to kill him if needed. Martinuzzi's secretary, Marco Aurelio Ferrari, was the hired assassin. On 16 December 1551, at the Alvinc Castle, Ferrari stabbed Martinuzzi from behind while he was reading a letter. The cardinal (age 68) fought for his life, and was only killed with the aid of Pallavicini and a band of bravi. Ferdinand accepted responsibility for the murder, and the pope excommunicated him and his generals. After receiving an 87-article accusation of Martinuzzi for treason and hearing testimony from 116 witnesses, the pope exonerated Ferdinand and lifted the excommunications in 1555.

== Legacy ==
A street in the old town Šibenik is named after Utješinović.

== Sources ==
- Barta, Gábor (1994). "The Emergence of the Principality and its First Crises (1526–1606)". In Köpeczi, Béla; Barta, Gábor; Bóna, István; Makkai, László; Szász, Zoltán; Borus, Judit (eds.). History of Transylvania. Akadémiai Kiadó. pp. 247–300. ISBN 963-05-6703-2.
- Cartledge, Bryan (2011). The Will to Survive: A History of Hungary. Hurst & Company. ISBN 978-184904-112-6.
- Kontler, László (1999). Millennium in Central Europe: A History of Hungary. Atlantisz Publishing House. ISBN 963-9165-37-9.
- Markó, László (2006). A magyar állam főméltóságai Szent Istvántól napjainkig: Életrajzi Lexikon [Great Officers of State in Hungary from King Saint Stephen to Our Days: A Biographical Encyclopedia] (in Hungarian). Helikon Kiadó. ISBN 963-547-085-1.
- Molnár, Miklós (2001). A Concise History of Hungary. Cambridge University Press. ISBN 978-0-521-66736-4.
- Oborni, Teréz (2017). Az ördöngős barát: Fráter György (1482–1551) [The Devilish Monk. Friar George (1482–1551)] (in Hungarian). Magyar Történelmi Társulat; Kronosz Kiadó. ISBN 978-963-467-001-8.
- Constantin von Wurzbach: "Utiešenović, Georg". In: Biographisches Lexikon des Kaiserthums Oesterreich. 49. Theil. Kaiserlich-königliche Hof- und Staatsdruckerei, Wien 1884, S. 160–162
- István Torjai-Szabó, Martinuzzi, Georg, in: Biographisches Lexikon zur Geschichte Südosteuropas. Bd. 3. Hgg. Mathias Bernath / Felix von Schroeder. München 1979, S. 110-111 [Onlineausgabe];

Political offices
Preceded by Emeric Balassa of Gyarmat	Voivode of Transylvania for Ferdinand I 1551	Succeeded by Andrew Báthory of Ecsed
