= Iana, Vaslui =

Iana
- Commune
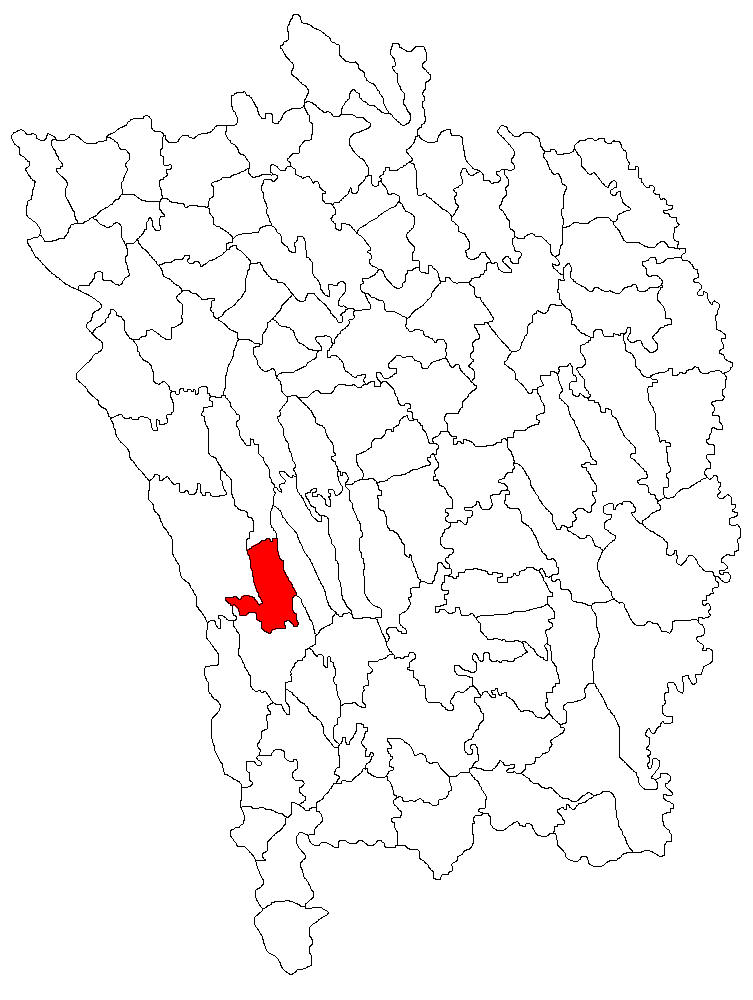
- Location in Vaslui County

- Location in Romania
- Coordinates: 46°23′N 27°33′E
- Country: Romania
- County: Vaslui
- Subdivisions: Hălărești, Iana, Recea, Siliștea, Vadurile

Government
  - Mayor (2020–2024): Ionuț-Adrian Totolici (PSD)
- Population (2021-12-01): 3,635
- Time zone: EET/EEST (UTC+2/+3)
- Vehicle reg.: VS

Iana is a commune in Vaslui County, Western Moldavia, Romania. It is composed of five villages: Hălărești, Iana, Recea, Siliștea and Vadurile.
