= Voinești, Vaslui =

Voinești
- Commune
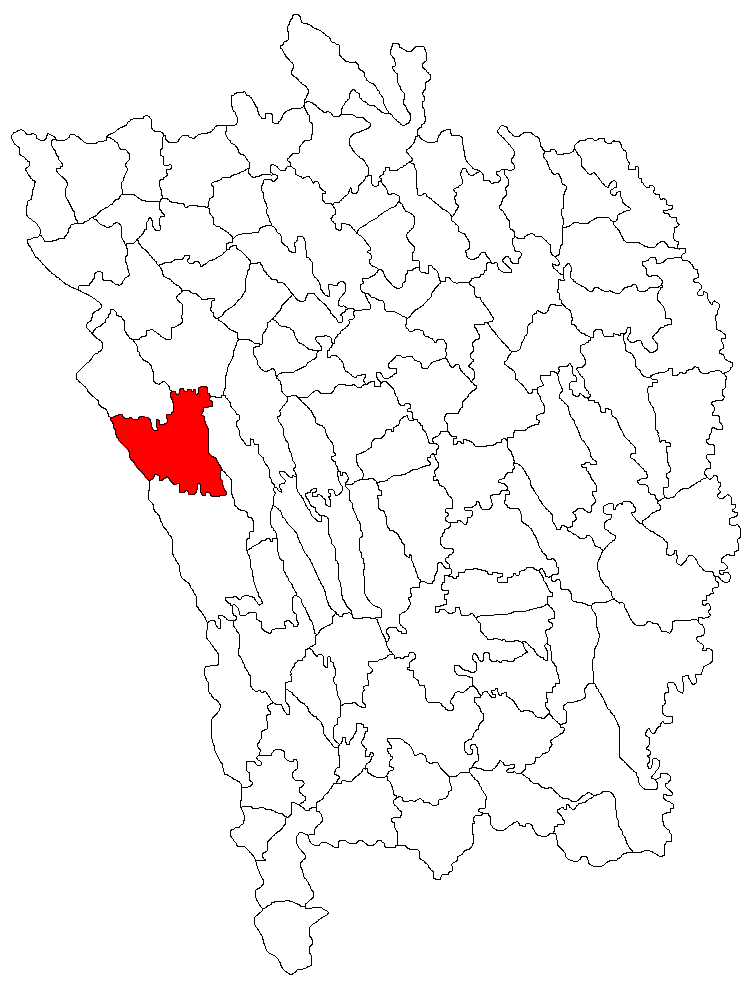
- Location in Vaslui County

- Location in Romania
- Coordinates: 46°34′N 27°25′E
- Country: Romania
- County: Vaslui
- Population (2021-12-01): 3,283
- Time zone: EET/EEST (UTC+2/+3)
- Vehicle reg.: VS

Voinești is a commune in Vaslui County, Western Moldavia, Romania. It is composed of eleven villages: Avrămești, Băncești, Corobănești, Gârdești, Mărășești, Obârșeni, Obârșenii Lingurari, Rugăria, Stâncășeni, Uricari and Voinești.
