= Dragomirești, Vaslui =

Dragomirești
- Commune
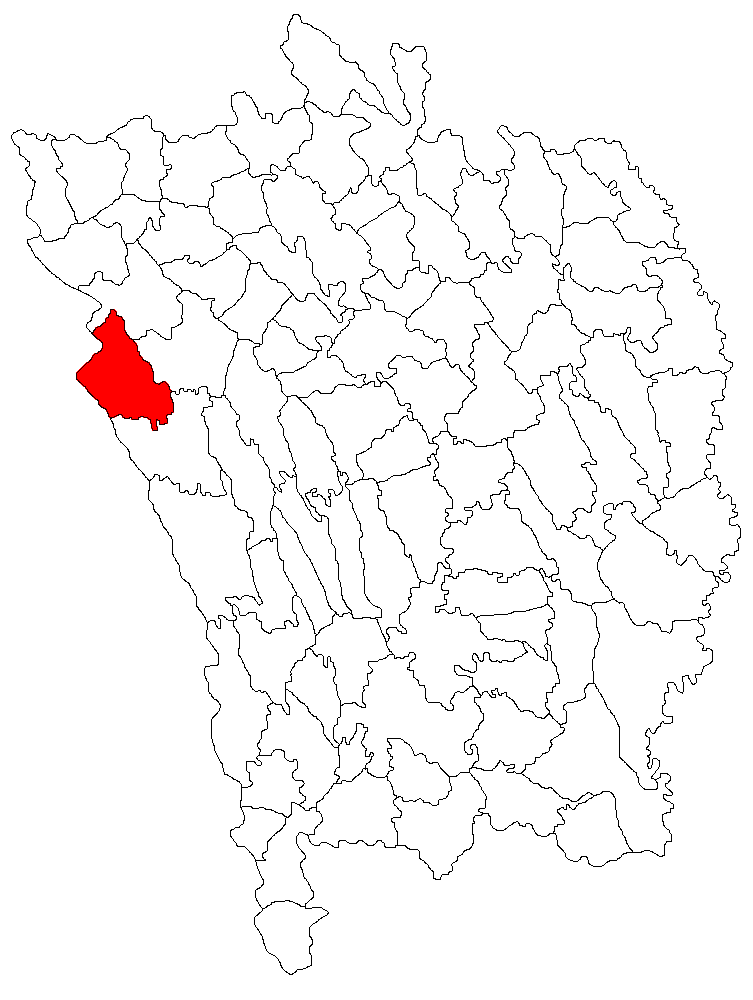
- Location in Vaslui County

- Location in Romania
- Coordinates: 46°38′N 27°21′E
- Country: Romania
- County: Vaslui

Government
  - Mayor (2020–2024): Dănuț Iacob (ALDE)
- Area: 74.18 km^{2} (28.64 sq mi)
- Population (2021-12-01): 4,389
  - Density: 59/km^{2} (150/sq mi)
- Time zone: EET/EEST (UTC+2/+3)
- Vehicle reg.: VS

Dragomirești is a commune in Vaslui County, Western Moldavia, Romania. It is composed of twelve villages: Băbuța, Belzeni, Boțoi, Ciuperca, Doagele, Dragomirești, Poiana Pietrei, Popești, Rădeni, Semenea, Tulești and Vladia.
