= Ivești, Vaslui =

Ivești
- Commune
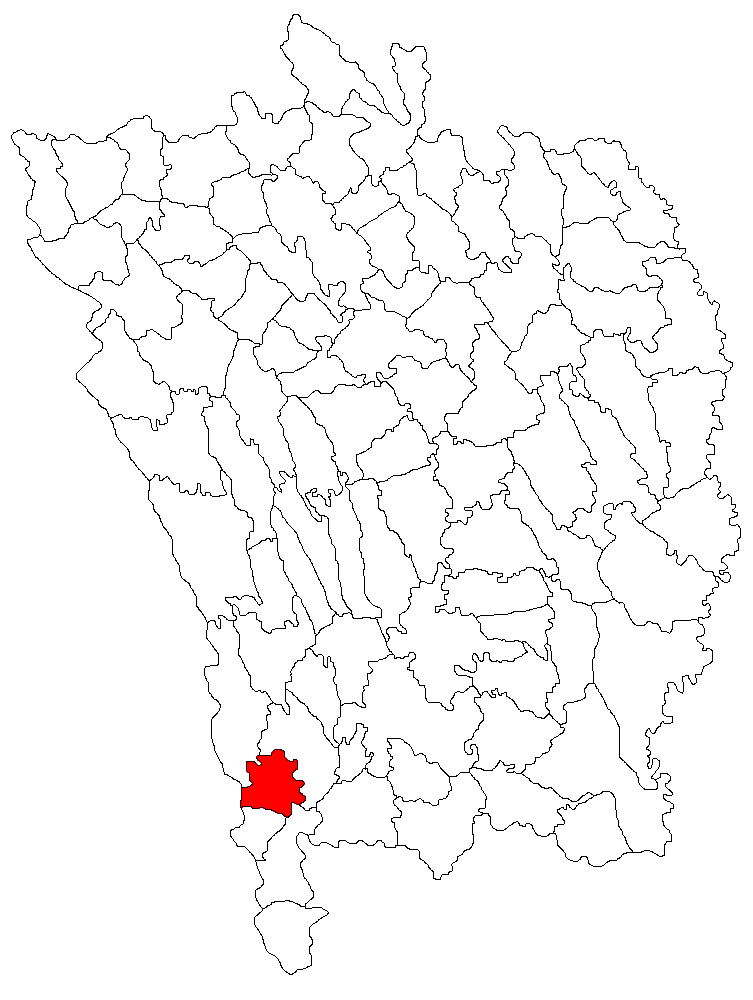
- Location in Vaslui County

- Location in Romania
- Coordinates: 46°11′N 27°32′E
- Country: Romania
- County: Vaslui
- Population (2021-12-01): 2,433
- Time zone: EET/EEST (UTC+2/+3)
- Vehicle reg.: VS

Ivești is a commune in Vaslui County, Western Moldavia, Romania. It is composed of a single village, Ivești. It included three other villages until 2004, when they were split off to form Pogonești Commune.
