= Tutova, Vaslui =

Tutova
- Commune
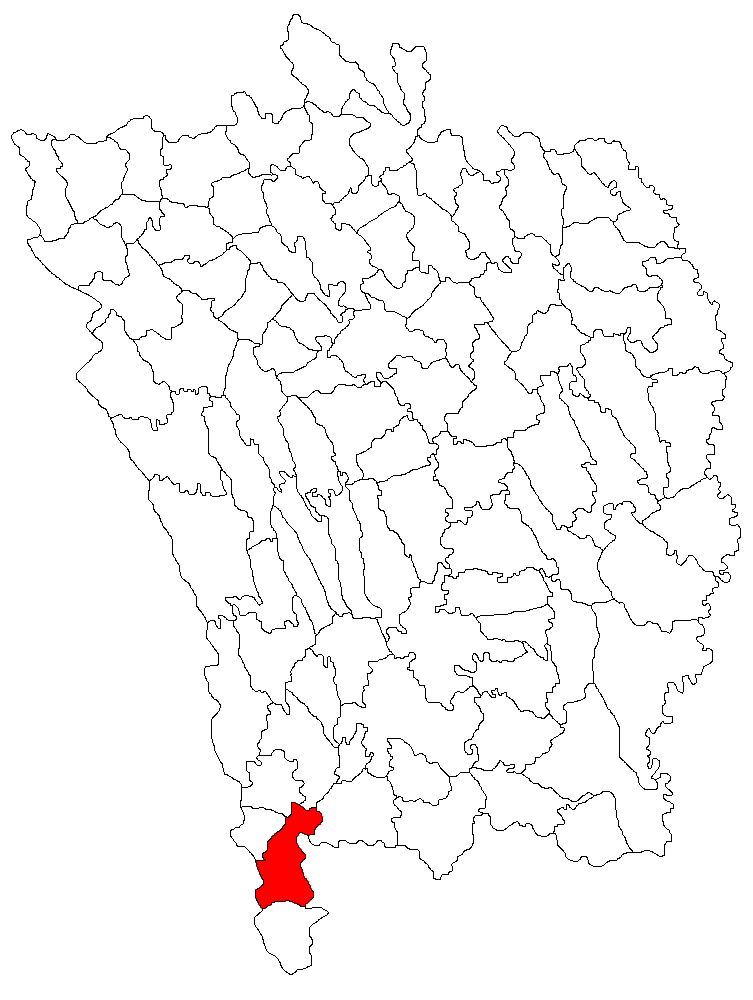
- Location in Vaslui County

- Location in Romania
- Coordinates: 46°07′N 27°33′E
- Country: Romania
- County: Vaslui
- Subdivisions: Bădeana, Ciortolom, Coroiu, Crivești, Tutova, Vizureni
- Population (2021-12-01): 2,952
- Time zone: EET/EEST (UTC+2/+3)
- Vehicle reg.: VS

Tutova is a commune in Vaslui County, Western Moldavia, Romania. It is composed of six villages: Bădeana, Ciortolom, Coroiu, Crivești, Tutova and Vizureni. It included four other villages until 2004, when these were split off to form Pochidia Commune.
