= Gherghești =

- Commune
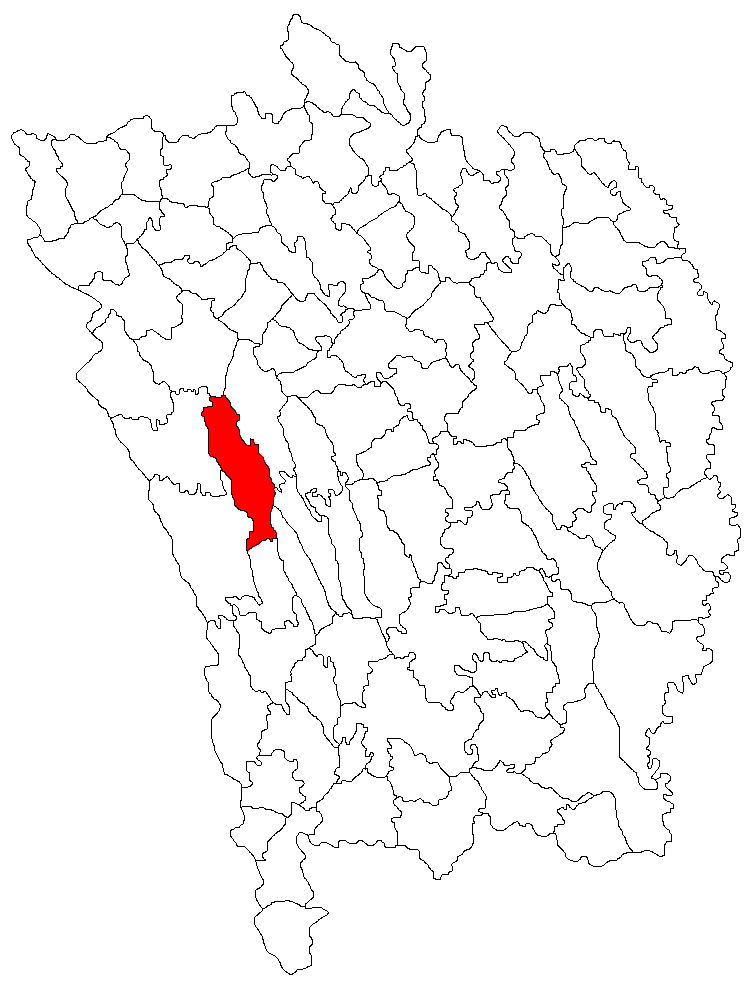
- Location in Vaslui County

- Location in Romania
- Coordinates: 46°30′N 27°31′E
- Country: Romania
- County: Vaslui
- Population (2021-12-01): 2,066
- Time zone: EET/EEST (UTC+2/+3)
- Postal code: 737270
- Vehicle reg.: VS

Gherghești is a commune in Vaslui County, Western Moldavia, Romania. It is composed of nine villages: Chetrosu, Corodești, Dragomănești, Drăxeni, Gherghești, Lazu, Lunca, Soci and Valea Lupului.
