= Puiești, Vaslui =

Puiești
- Commune
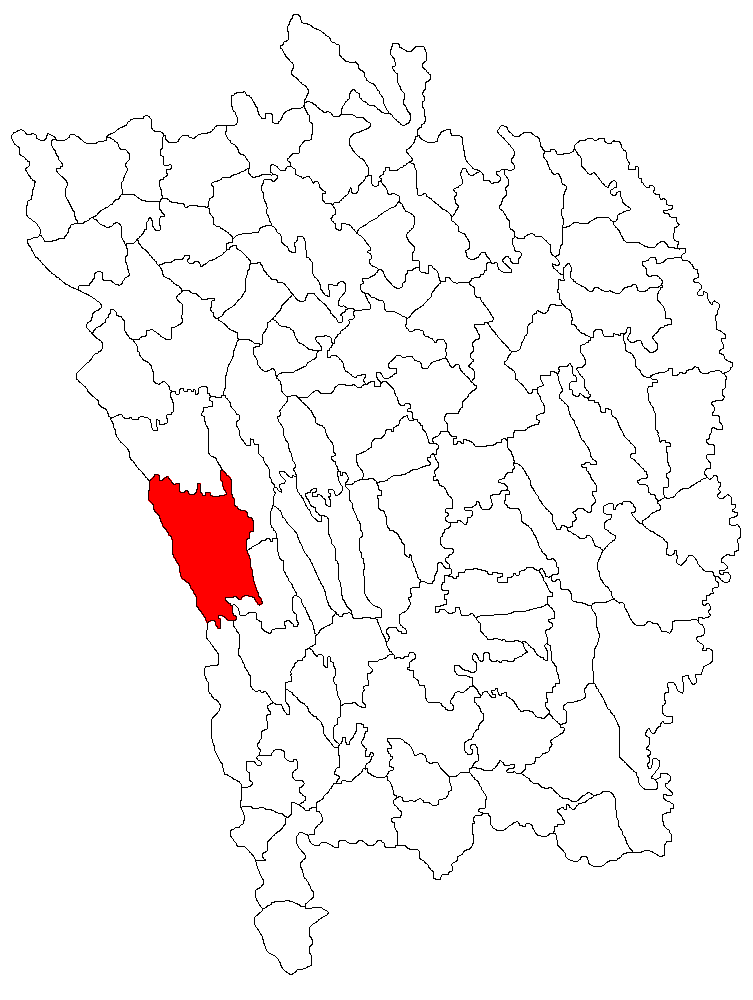
- Location in Vaslui County

- Location in Romania
- Coordinates: 46°25′N 27°30′E
- Country: Romania
- County: Vaslui

Government
  - Mayor (2020–2024): Vasile-Cezar Ticu (ALDE)
- Area: 120.4 km^{2} (46.5 sq mi)
- Elevation: 125 m (410 ft)
- Population (2021-12-01): 4,121
  - Density: 34/km^{2} (89/sq mi)
- Time zone: EET/EEST (UTC+2/+3)
- Postal code: 737425
- Area code: +(40) 235
- Vehicle reg.: VS
- Website: www.comunapuiesti.ro

Puiești is a commune in Vaslui County, Western Moldavia, Romania. It is composed of thirteen villages: Bărtăluș-Mocani, Bărtăluș-Răzeși, Călimănești, Cetățuia, Cristești, Fântânele, Fulgu, Gâlțești, Iezer, Lălești, Puiești, Rotari, and Ruși.

== Natives ==
- Felix Aderca (1891–1962), novelist, playwright, poet, journalist, and critic
