= Orăștie =

Orăștie Broos
- Municipality
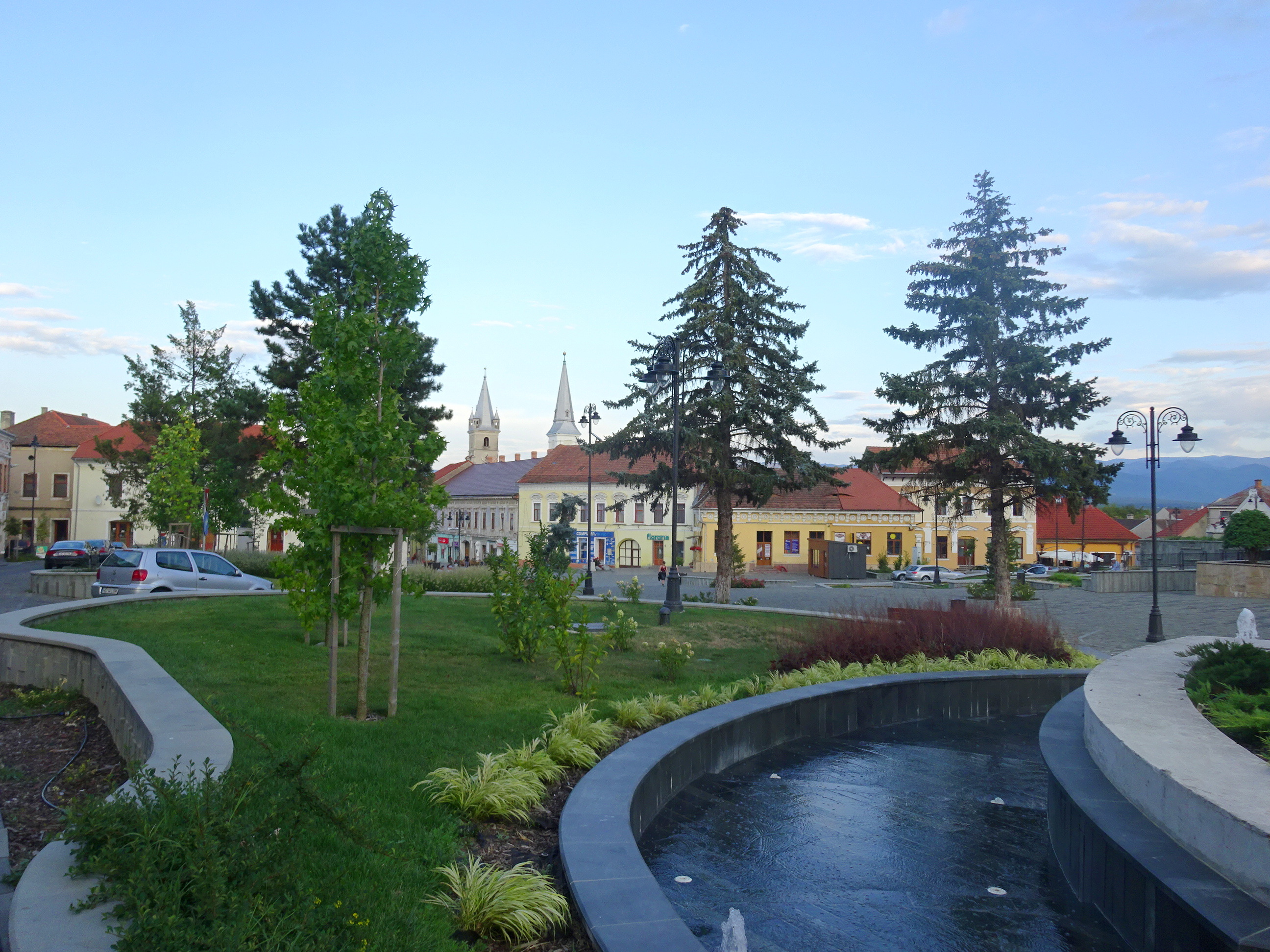
- Old town

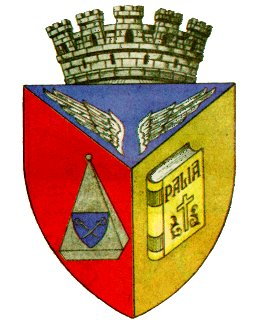
- Coat of arms

- Location in Hunedoara County

- Location in Romania
- Coordinates: 45°51′N 23°12′E
- Country: Romania
- County: Hunedoara

Government
  - Mayor (2024–2028): Ovidiu-Laurențiu Bălan (PSD)
- Area: 38.62 km^{2} (14.91 sq mi)
- Elevation: 220 m (720 ft)
- Population (2021-12-01): 16,825
  - Density: 435.7/km^{2} (1,128/sq mi)
- Time zone: UTC+02:00 (EET)
  - Summer (DST): UTC+03:00 (EEST)
- Postal code: 335700
- Area code: (+40) 02 54
- Vehicle reg.: HD
- Website: www.orastie.info.ro

Orăștie (Romanian pronunciation: [orəʃˈti.e]; German: Broos, Hungarian: Váras, later Szászváros, Latin: Saxopolis, Transylvanian Saxon: Brooss) is a small town and municipality in Hunedoara County, south-western Transylvania, central Romania.

== History ==
Historical population
Year	Pop.	±%
1309	1,600	—
1733	2,800	+75.0%
1786	3,190	+13.9%
1854	4,207	+31.9%
1857	5,029	+19.5%
1877	5,661	+12.6%
1880	5,451	−3.7%
1900	6,238	+14.4%
1910	6,937	+11.2%
1930	7,377	+6.3%
1941	9,751	+32.2%
1948	8,819	−9.6%
1956	10,488	+18.9%
1960	11,726	+11.8%
1966	12,822	+9.3%
1973	14,994	+16.9%
1992	24,174	+61.2%
2002	21,213	−12.2%
2011	17,255	−18.7%
2021	16,825	−2.5%

7th–9th century – On the site of an old swamp was a human settlement, now the location of the old town center, whose remains can be traced into the 10th century when the first fortification was built with raised earth and wood stockades.

11th–12th century – The first Christian religious edifice was raised: The Váras Rotunda. It is a circular chapel, with an age estimated at 1000 years. Perhaps it was used only by aristocratic families that dominated the Váras area and surroundings in the 11th century. Nearby there is a similar construction from the same period – The Algyógy Rotunda.

1105 – In the wake of the First Crusade Anselm von Braz ”liber de liberis genitus", châtelain of Logne, Walloon ministerial count settled here. The historian Karl Kurt Klein implies – though without proof – that he moved with his sons and descendants into the region where Váras City is located today.

1200 – According to Transylvanian chronicles, this is the year in which construction of the city walls began. Subsequently, this was abandoned because of unfavorable conditions.

1206 – The King of Hungary, Andrew II, mentioned Romos, a village near Váras, as one of the first three villages in Transylvania comprising Saxon colonists. The other two villages are Magyarigen and Boroskrakkó.

1224 – Andrew II confirmed the privileges of the Saxon colonists and mentioned the existence of Romanian (Blachi) and Pecheneg (Bisseni) populations who lived in the forests surrounding the town. The settlement kept a number of privileges granted by the Hungarian royalty. The town was ruled by a royal judge (iudex regium), helped by 12 jurors chosen from local craftsmen and rich traders.

1239 – This is the probable founding year of the convent of the Váras Franciscan church.

1241 – Váras was devastated during the Mongol invasion. A Mongolian tumen under the leadership of Büri entered Transylvania via the Olt Valley, near Fogaras, from the direction of Nagyszeben, which was conquered on 11 April. One after another were devastated the Seats of Szerdahely (Ruzmargt), Szászsebes (Mühlbach) and Váras (Broos). The Mongolian army arrived at Csanád on 25 April. Váras was probably destroyed between 11 and 25 April. The Mongol devastation of the settlements and cities is vividly shown in the dramatic description of Gyulafehérvár written by the Franciscan friar Rogerius of Apulia:

“ ... I could not find anything except the bones and skulls of those who were killed, scattered and broken walls of churches and palaces that have been sprinkled by the blood of Christians".

In the future, King Béla IV would populate the region with new Saxon colonists and settlers.

1309 – Váras had about 1,600 inhabitants. The Franciscan Order had been established in the city, and they built a church on the site of the current Franciscan friary.

1324 – The Hungarian King Charles I Robert announced that the settlement would be awarded the rank of town.

1334 – The priest John ( Johannes Sacerdos ), the tax collector in the Váras region, performed a census by counting chimneys. Three hundred forty-four houses were numbered, a public bath, and four houses belonging to four nuns and the priest Nicholas (Nikolaus). This was the first time the presence of Saxons in the Pricaz village was mentioned. Also mentioned are two public schools belonging to the Saxons in the Váras area.

1344 – Earliest mention was made of the patron "Saint Nicholas" of the Catholic Church from Váras.

1349 – In a document issued at Sibiu, the Seat of Váras (de sede Waras) was noted for the first time.

1364 – Saxons were settled in a colony near Váras, in the Kastendorf village.

1367 – A letter sent to the comes Christian of Váras (de Warasyo) from Archeacon Ladislau of Ugocsa is the oldest evidence for the functioning of a royal judge for the Seat of Váras.

1372 – Comes Stephanus of Warasyo (István Várasi) was named as representative of the Seven Saxon Seats in Transylvania.

1374 – Chronicles named Count Nicolaus de Várasi (de Warasio) and the ruler of the region Nicolaus Blas de Váras (Michael Blas von Broos).

1376 – Nineteen guilds (fraternitas) were mentioned as active in the town.

1420 – The county was raided by the Ottomans. On 24 September 1420, a Turkish army invaded the south-east of Transylvania defeating, near Hátszeg County, an armed militia under the command of Transylvanian voivode Miklós Csáki. After two days the Turkish army looted and burned Váras and its surroundings before retreating, taking several thousand prisoners as slaves.

1425 – Saxons from Váras became suppliers for the Turks. The town was referred to by its German name, Bros or Broos.

1433 – Registers of the Vatican listed a few pilgrims from Transylvania, Banat, and Wallachia. Among them was Petru, son of Blasius of Váras (de Váras). The register stated that Peter, previously of the Eastern Orthodox faith (grecorum), was baptized on the day of Holy Trinity into the Catholic Church of Saint Peter in Rome, in the presence of John Sigismund, King of Hungary. It was also noted that Peter, as a soldier of his king, took part in several military actions against the Turks and Bohemians.

1436 – Hungarians were mentioned as living in the center of the town.

1438 – A Turkish army led by sultan Murad II together with a Wallachian army under Vlad Dracula entered Transylvania, where they looted and spoiled Váras and the Romos village. On this occasion the Franciscan friary was burned. Later the Franciscan order rebuilt it.

1442 – Another Turkish invasion of Transylvania led to a battle at Marosszentimre (18 March 1442), which ended with a Turkish victory under Mezid (Mezet) Bey of Vidin. The town was looted and burned.

1449 – Chronicles note the comes Bartholomew of Váras attending a meeting of the Seven Seats.

1479 – A Turkish army entered Transylvania near Câlnic on 9 October, led by Ali Kodsha and Skender, or, according to some sources, by Ali Michaloglu and Skander. Ottoman forces likely numbered 20000 soldiers, and 1000–2000 Wallachian infantrymen under Basarab cel Tânăr-Țepeluș. On 13 October Kodsha Bey set up camp in the Breadfield, a place between Alkenyér and Váras. The Hungarian army was led by Pál Kinizsi, István Báthory, Vuk Branković, and Basarab Laiotă cel Bătrân. All forces combined totaled 12 or 15,000 men. The Battle of Breadfield took place in a location between Váras and Alkenyér. Turkish casualties were high, with several thousand killed, including a thousand Wallachian allies. The few Turks who survived fled into the mountains, where the majority were killed by the local population. In memory of this victory, Stephen Báthory raised a chapel near the village Aurel Vlaicu. When the Turks looted the city, they destroyed a large part of cultivated land, and the church inside the castle was damaged. Later, the church was rebuilt and taken into possession by the Hungarians. This is why, although the city was a Saxon fortress, the church became the property of reforming Hungarians and Saxons received only a room beside the church. This room was used as a place of worship until 1823 when a new church was built by Saxons.

1486 – Because of disagreements between the Seat of Váras and Hunyad County, the Saxon University of Sibiu called in the Hungarian king Matthias Corvinus to regulate the borders between the two territories.

1488 – A population census of the Saxon Seats recorded population, mills, devastated properties, Catholics and Orthodox priests, and sometimes impoverished households. In Váras (oppidi Brosz) were recorded: 158 Saxons, 2 poor inhabitants, 4 shepherds, 1 miller and 10 abandoned households.

1491 – Saxons and Hungarians worked out an agreement that the function of Royal Judge be held alternately, and that each of the two nations should be represented in the Senate by equal numbers.

1500 – The annual fair on Saint Nicholas Day was held for the first time in history.

1504 – Stephen Olahus, father of the great humanist Nicolaus Olahus, was appointed by the King as a judge of Váras.

1509 – The presence of gypsies is first noted in Váras: "The ledger of Sibiu city notes a payment made to two employees sent to Váras to escort some Gypsies who were held and accused of violent crimes in the market place in Váras." In this year, Voivode John Zápolya moved population from Banat to Váras and Tordos to bolster the region's decreasing population growth.

1514 – During the war led by György Dózsa, Zápolya's army passed through the region, and Zápolya noted that the town was not sufficiently protected or equipped for war.

1520 – 25 April, at Buda, Louis II Hungary directed the Mayor of Szeben to appoint the noble Matthew Olahus of Szászváros (de Zazwaras) as Royal Judge of the town, a position then held by Mathew's elderly father Stephen. The sovereign conferred along with this all revenues from taxation, and also other customary benefits.

1529 – Váras was to make its oath of allegiance to the new King John Zápolya.

1533 – Following the expansion of Lutheranism in Váras, the Franciscan Order was expelled.

1536 – On 4 June 1536 Matthew Olahus, brother of Nicolaus Olahus, archbishop of Esztergom, died.

1544 – Váras fortress was mentioned in chronicles by Sebastian Münster.

“... and there is another strong fortress, below Sebes, near the town Váras ...”

1550 – The name Saxopolis appeared for the first time. Georg Reicherstorffer in "Chorographia Transilvaniae", printed in Vienna in 1550, wrote:

"Váras city, which is called Broos by the Saxons, is located a mile away to the south of the grain fields. It is situated on the river Maros. The soil is unusually fertile, liberally yielding wheat, wine, and many fruits; the people are very tractable and in clothing style and diet are closer to the Romanians, who live broadly scattered in the desolate plains around".

1560 – Váras Fortress is mentioned in chronicles by Giovanandrea Gromo. At about this time the ethnic Hungarian community converted to Protestantism and the Romanian Catholic Church became Reformed Calvinist.

1599 – Michael the Brave asked the town for a loan of 1,000 florins.

1582 – The Old Testament of Váras, one of the first Romanian-language translations of the Bible, was printed here with the help of the constable of Déva castle, Geszti Ferenc.

1602 – General Giorgio Basta garrisoned 400 Imperial soldiers in the town. Their conduct caused the townsfolk to flee or otherwise barricade themselves in the church's castle. Later in the same year, general Gabriel Bethlen, with an army of Tatars, Turks, Hungarians and Serbs besieged the town. The Imperial soldiers were denied access to the church's castle, and all but eleven were killed. In August, Basta retook Transylvania and hanged the Mayor of Váras and two other prominent burghers.

1604 – Fifteen hundred of Basta's soldiers were garrisoned in the town. Extreme famine gave rise to cannibalism.

1605 – A large part of the town was destroyed.

1661 – An Ottoman army in pursuit of John Kemény set fire to Váras and Szászsebes.

1663 – The Reformed College was established by Michael I Apafi.

1697 – The first pharmacy of the town, "Graffius", was established.

1733 – The tax registry mentioned 2,800 inhabitants in 568 families: 240 Romanian families, 170 Hungarian, 100 Saxon, 50 Gypsy and 8 Greek.

1738 – Plague caused the deaths of 156 people.

1749 – The Roman Catholic Church was built in its current form (a tower being added in 1880).

1752–1756 – One hundred forty-four colonists from Upper Austria settled in the town.

1757–1758 – Another 222 colonists arrived from the same region.

1784 – The peasants' rebellion of Horea, Cloșca and Crișan occurred.

1820–1823 – The Lutheran church was built (a tower being added in 1841).

1828 – A large fire destroyed 127 houses.

1848 – Fighting was seen between Hungarian Revolutionary forces under General Józef Bem and the Austrian armies.

1853 – Transylvania was reorganised into 10 counties. The third one was centered on Váras. The county had 134,77 square miles/348,90 square km and 214,165 inhabitants. By ethnicity, its population comprised: 192,995 Romanians, 7,809 Hungarians, 1,063 Germans (and 12,297 of other categories). By religion: 160,603 Eastern Orthodox, 38,550 Eastern Rite Catholics, 8,565 Lutherans, 4,283 Roman Catholic, 2,141 Calvinists and 23 of other religions.

1857 – The census counted 5,029 inhabitants: 1,850 Eastern Orthodox, 1,136 Roman Catholic, 884 Lutheran, 688 Calvinist, 486 Eastern Rite, 24 Jewish, 19 Unitarian and 5 Armenian.

1867 – The synagogue was built.

1869 – The first bank was established: "Brooser Vorschuss-verein".

1880 – Váras had 1,086 houses and 5,451 inhabitants: 2,312 Romanians, 1,427 Germans, 1,227 Hungarians, 16 Slovaks, 8 Serbs, 176 other nationalities, 138 foreigners and 147 of unknown maternal language (a category that included Roma (Gypsies)); 2,030 Eastern Orthodox, 1,002 Roman Catholic, 964 Lutheran, 769 Calvinist, 523 Eastern Rite, 163 Jewish.

1900 – Electrical street lighting was introduced.

1910 – 6,937 inhabitants (of which 3,276 Romanians).

1940–44 Persecution and eventual deportation of Jewish and Roma residents.

2011 – The 2011 census counted 17,255 inhabitants: 92.01% Romanians, 5.59% Roma, 1.75% Hungarians, 0.41% Germans.

2021 – At the 2021 census, the city had a population of 16,825.

== Culture and recreation ==
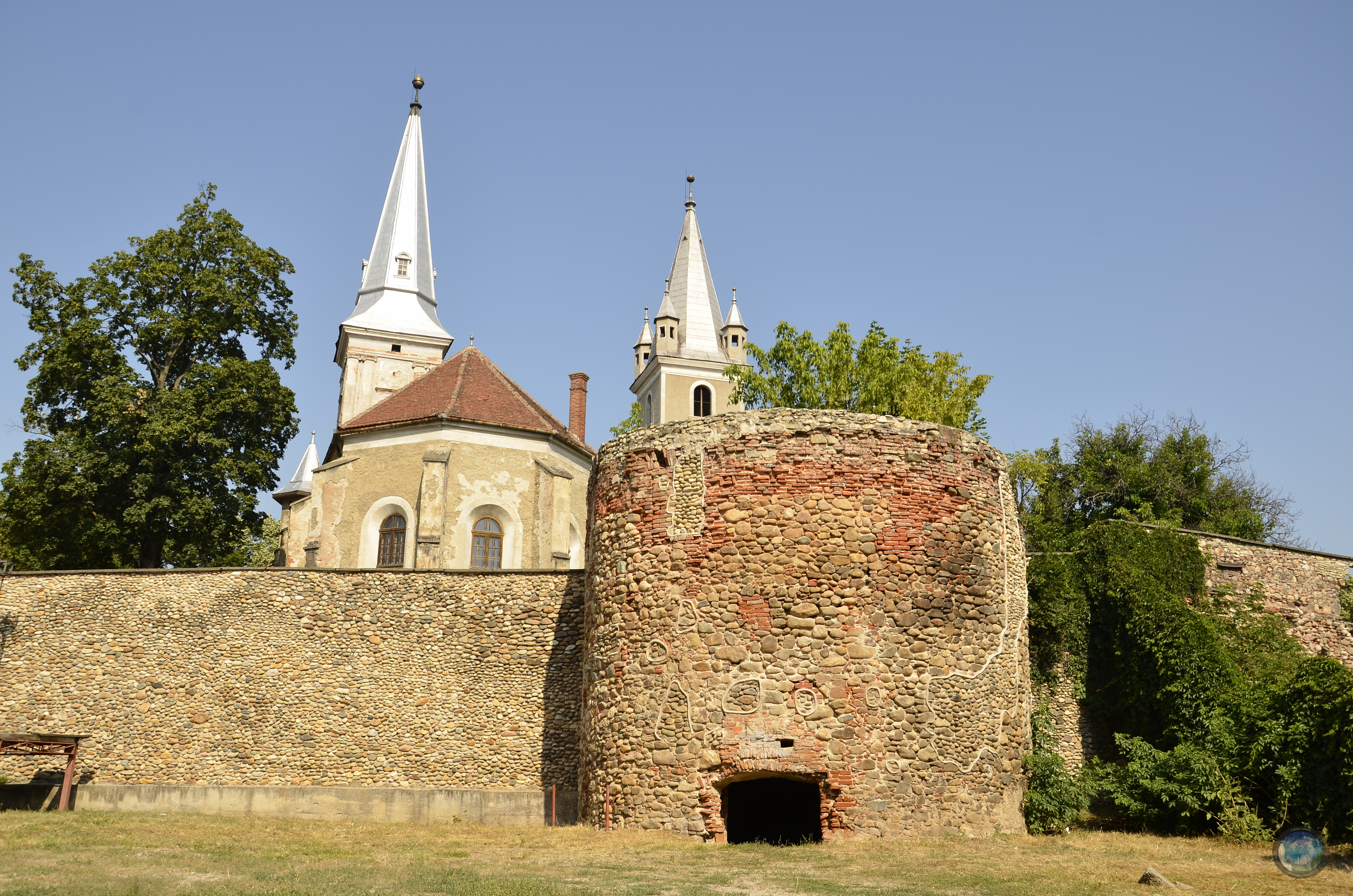
Fortified church in Váras

A medieval fortified church in Váras was built around 1400 in the Gothic style on the foundations of the older Romanesque basilica. A new Lutheran church was built to the north of the old one between 1820 and 1823. Both churches are surrounded by a wall.

The city no longer has an active Jewish population, but its historic synagogue has been renovated by the municipality and is used as House of Culture.

== Natives ==
- Mihai Iacob (1933–2009), film director and screenwriter
- Ernő Koch (1898–1970), graphic artist
- Elizabeth Roboz Einstein (1904–1995), biochemist and neuroscientist, daughter-in-law to Albert Einstein
- Nicolae Szoboszlay (1925–2019), football goalkeeper and manager

== Image gallery ==
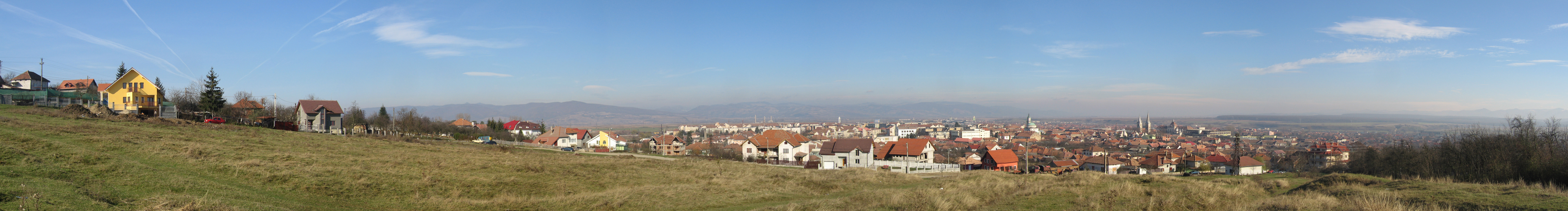
View from "Dealu Mic" hill

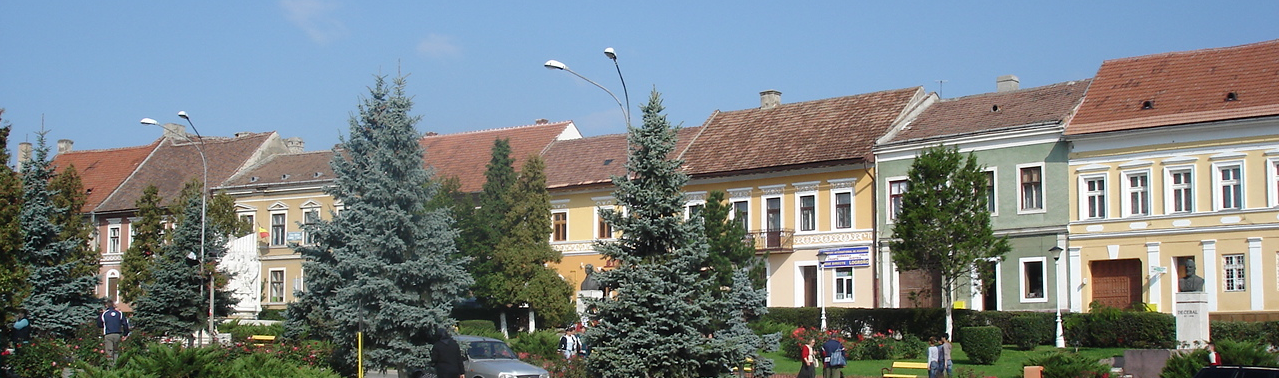
Cathedral plaza (Romanian: Piața Catedralei)

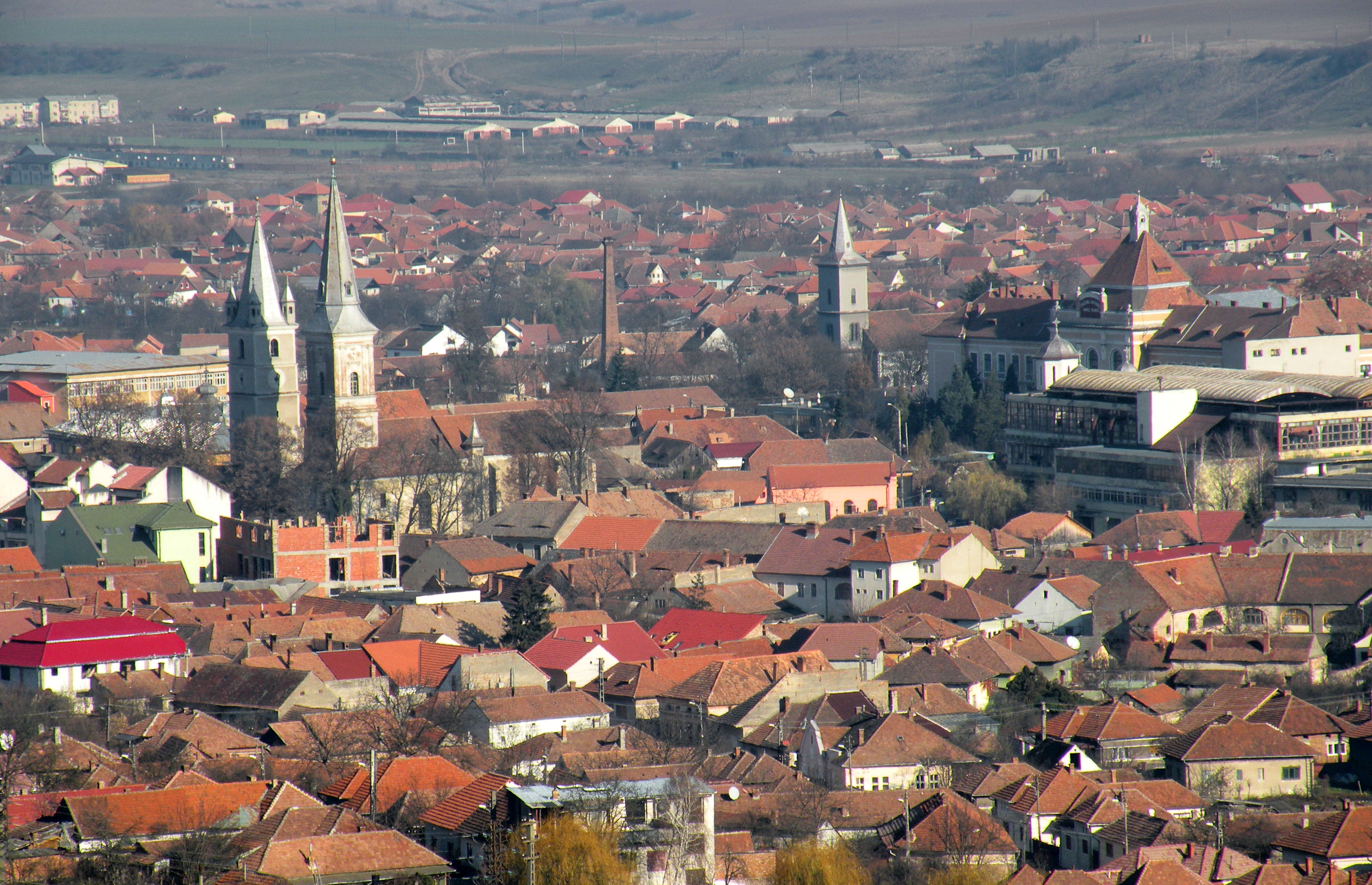
View from "Dealu Mic" hill

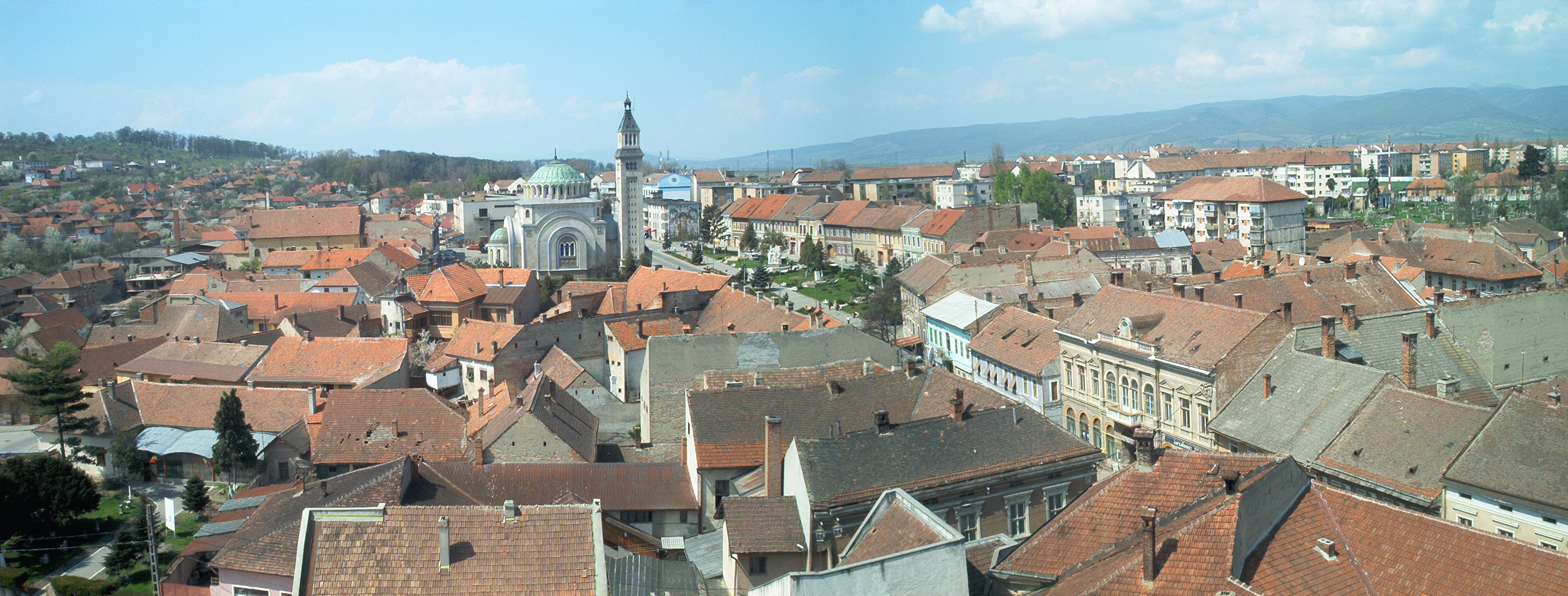
Photo taken from Lutheran church tower

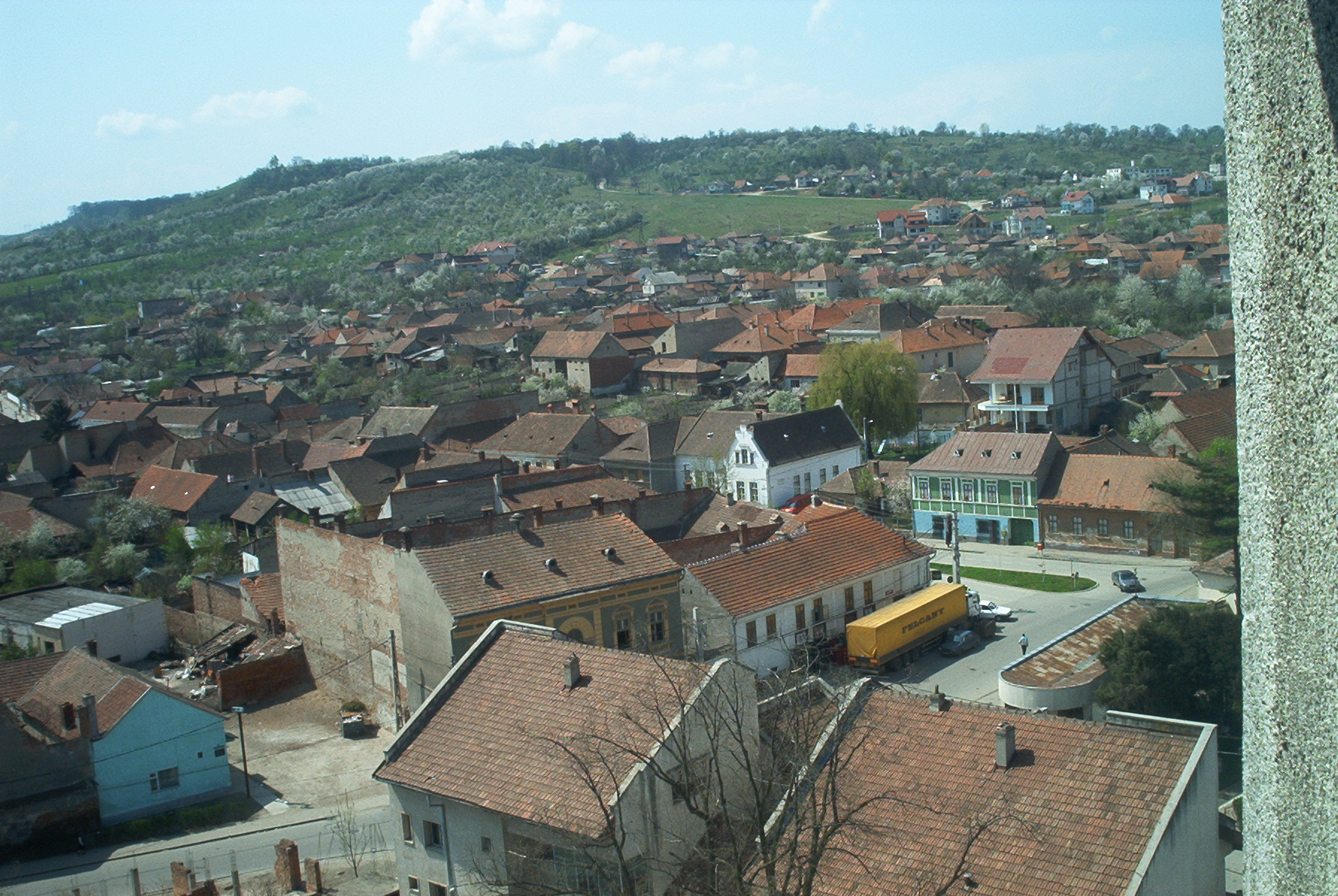
Photo taken from Lutheran church tower

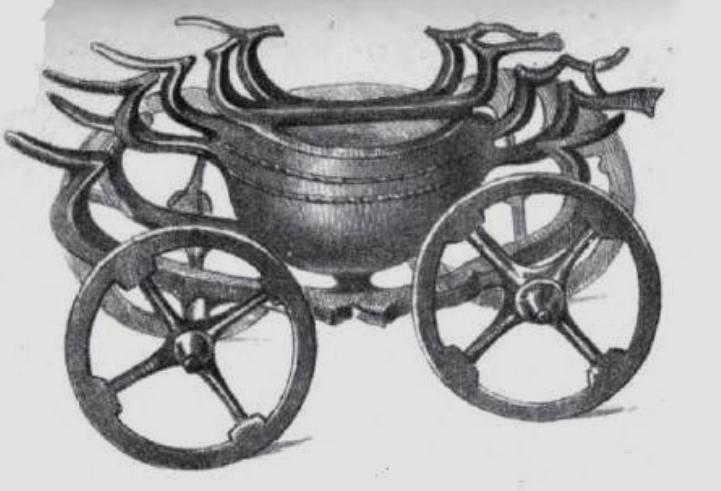
Bronze Age cauldron-wagon model. Urnfield culture.

== See also ==
- Dacian Fortresses of the Orăștie Mountains
- Orăștie River
- CSM Dacia Orăștie
- Stadionul Dacia (Orăștie)
