= Fekete Sereg Youth Association =

Hungarian youth organization

Fekete Sereg Youth Association Fekete Sereg Ifjúsági Egyesület
- Abbreviation: Fekete Sereg
- Formation: 1997
- Type: Egyesület (Association)
- Headquarters: Nagyvázsony, Hungary
- Location: Europe
- Members: 10
- Official language: English (working language)Hungarian (working language)
- President: Rita Kandikó
- Affiliations: European Youth Forum, European Movement International, European Civil Society Platform for lifelong Learning, European Voluntary Service Anna Lindh Foundation Council of Europe (participatory status)
- Staff: 5

The Fekete Sereg Youth Association is a non-governmental organization, based in Nagyvázsony, whose main aim is to provide a useful pastime for young people from Nagyvázsony and the surrounding area. In 2022 the Volunteer Center Foundation awarded the Vázsonykő project as the "Best Volunteer Program of the Year" in Hungary.

== Origin of the name ==
Fekete Sereg literally means "black army", which was a common name given to the military forces serving under the reign of King Matthias Corvinus of Hungary. The most famous general of the army was Pál Kinizsi, whose central estate was the Castle of Nagyvázsony. For this reason, the founders decided to name the association in honour of the famous general Kinizsi. The Kinizsi cult retains its importance to the village even in modern times. For example, the name of the castle is "Kinizsi-vár" or "Castle of Kinizsi". Overall, the name symbolizes the cult of Kinizsi and the attachment to local traditions.

== Main activities ==
The Association has several activities targeting students, unemployed, minorities (gypsies), disadvantaged and handicapped people. The activities include:

- EVS (European Voluntary Service)
- Media program (since 2001): Publisher of a local newsletter (Sereghajtó) and the local TV
- Kinizsi Grave Research: On 22 August 2022, an archaeological excavation was launched in Nagyvázsony with the aim of locating the remains of the undefeated general, Pál Kinizsi. The project was organized under the auspices of the Fekete Sereg Youth Association, led by Ádám Sándor Pátkai and Zsombor Győrffy-Villám, with Dr. Csanád Kandikó serving as project director. The excavations were continued in 2023, 2024, and 2025, attracting each year between 20 and 30 volunteers from more than ten different countries.

== Memberships ==
- EVS (European Voluntary Service): The association is an accredited European Voluntary Service hosting, sending and coordinating association
- Anna Lindh Foundation
