= Breadfield =

Breadfield Câmpul Pâinii
- Region
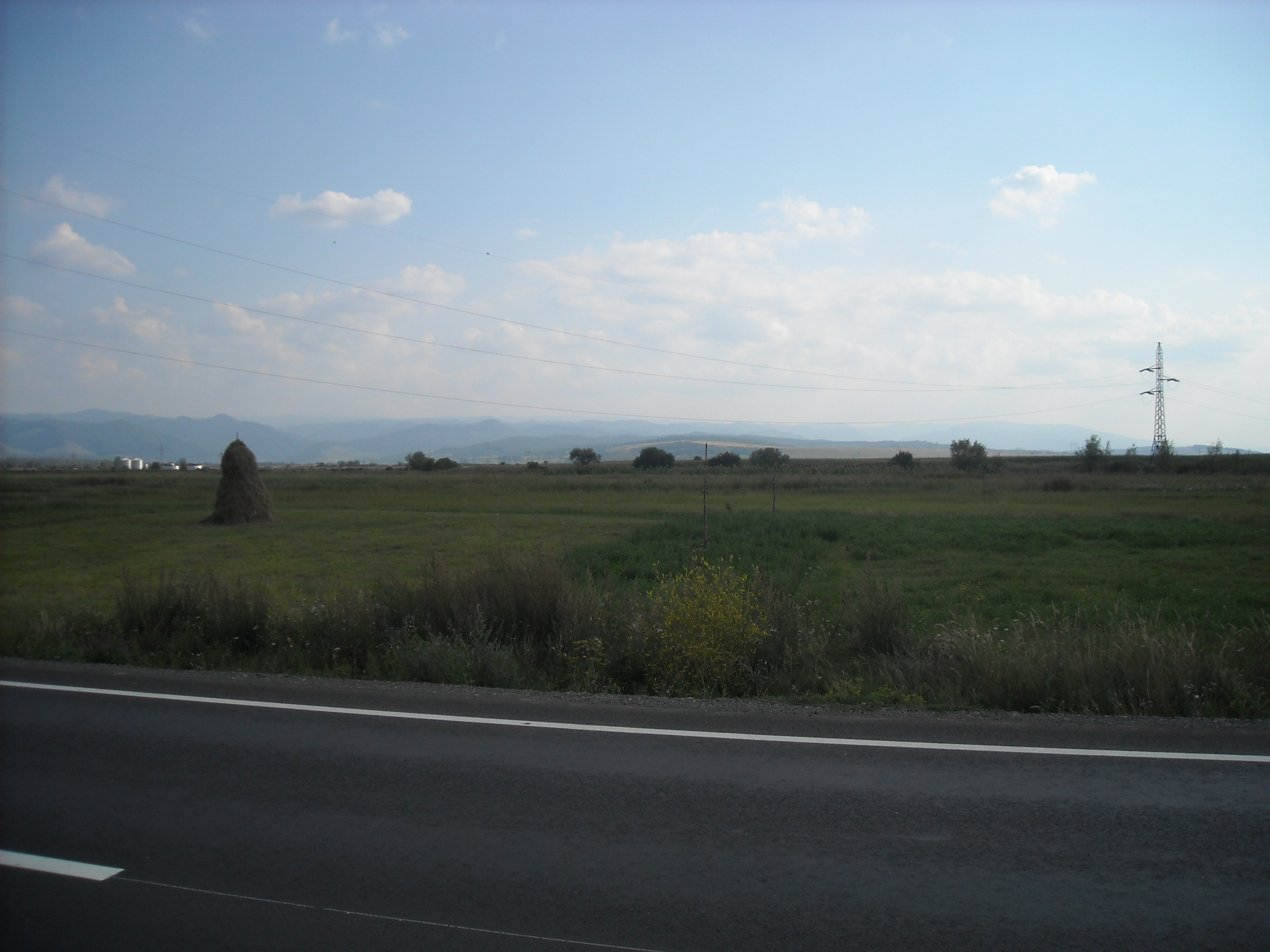
- View between Vinerea and Șibot, 2009

- Location within Romania
- Coordinates: 45°55′42″N 23°19′44″E
- Country: Romania
- Historical region: Transylvania

The Breadfield (Romanian: Câmpul Pâinii, Hungarian: Kenyérmező, German: Brodfeld, Turkish: Ekmekoltağı) is a region in southwest Transylvania, Romania between Orăștie (Szászváros) and Sebeș (Szászsebes) in the Transylvanian Saxon land, near the Mureș River. The central settlement is Cugir (Hungarian: Kudzsir, German: Kudschir, Turkish: Kuçir).

The Cugir River's old Magyar name is Kenyér (bread), which gave rise to the name Breadfield. The region's borders to the south are the Cugir Mountains, to the north the Mureș River, to the west Hunedoara County, and to the east the Sebeș River.

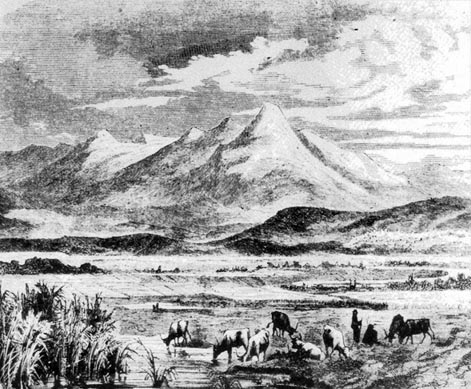
1870 sketch by Miklós Nagy

The area is a fertile plain. Formerly, Breadfield's population was largely Saxons, but today it is chiefly Romanians. In 1479 the Hungarians scored a victory over the Ottoman Army in the Battle of Breadfield, near Șibot. In remembrance of the victory, Stephen V Báthory built a chapel.

Settlements of Breadfield

- Vințu de Jos (hung. Alvinc, ger. Unterwintz or Winzendorf)
- Pianul de Jos (hung. Alsópián, Szászpián, Romanian Chian, ger. Deutschpien or Deutschpian)
- Săliștea (hung. Tartaria, later Alsótatárlaka, in 1310 Oláhárkos and Szászárkos or -erkes, in 1488 Grebencsin)
- Săliștea (a different town from the above-mentioned settlement; sometime Cioara, hung. Alsócsóra)
- Balomiru de Câmp (hung. Balomir)
- Șibot (hung. Alkenyér or Zsibotalkenyér, ger. Unterbrodsdorf)
- Vinerea (hung. Felkenyér, ger. Oberbrodsdorf)
- Cugir
- Aurel Vlaicu (previously Binținți, hung. Bencenc, ger. Benzendorf; the location of the Breadfield Battle)
- Pișchinți (hung. Piskinc)
- Vaidei (hung. Vajdej, ger. Weidendorf)
- Romos (hung. Romosz, ger. Rumes)
- Gelmar (hung. Gyalmár)

== See also ==
- Battle of Breadfield
- The Holocaust in Hungary: Nazis cheated Hungarian Jews into believing they would be only resettled in Kenyérmező (see Rezső Kasztner)
