= Battle of Breadfield =

1479 battle of the Ottoman–Hungarian Wars

Coordinates: 45°56′15″N 23°20′40″E

- Part of the Hungarian–Ottoman Wars
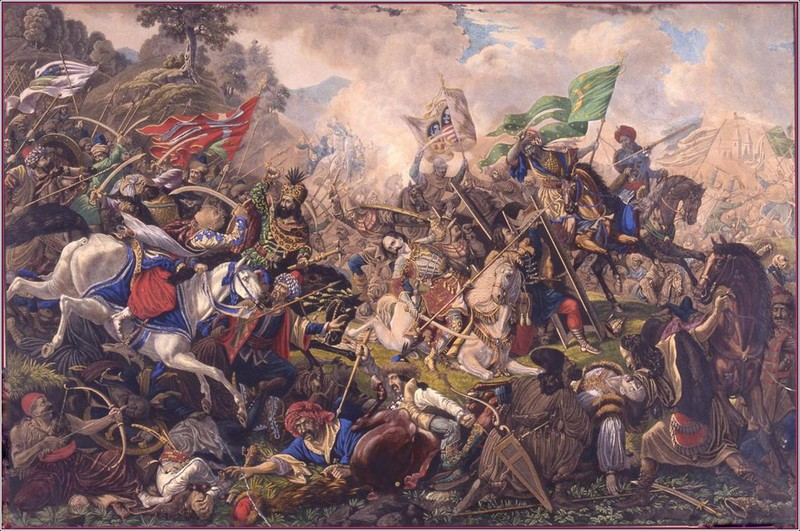
- Battle of Breadfield by Eduard Gurk
Date	13 October 1479
Location	The Breadfield (Kenyérmező), in Alkenyér, near the River Maros, Transylvania, Kingdom of Hungary
Result	Hungarian victory

Belligerents
Kingdom of Hungary	Ottoman Empire

Commanders and leaders
Paul Kinizsi; Stephen V Báthory; Bartholomew Drágfi; Vuk Grgurević-Branković; Dmitar Jakšić; Basarab Laiotă cel Bătrân	Ali Bey

Strength
12,000–15,000 men (Hungarians, Székelys, Transylvanian Saxons, Serbs, Poles, Transylvanian Vlachs)	Around 30,000 men consisting of Akıncı, Sipahi and Azaps, and some Janissary; 1,000–2,000 Wallachian mercenaries or up to 60,000

Casualties and losses
8,000 killed (Hungarian claim)	30,000 Ottomans & Wallachians (Hungarian claim)

The Battle of Breadfield (Hungarian: Kenyérmezei csata, German: Schlacht auf dem Brodfeld, Romanian: Bătălia de la Câmpul Pâinii, Turkish: Ekmek Otlak Savaşı) was the most tremendous conflict fought in Transylvania up to that time in the Ottoman–Hungarian Wars, taking place on 13 October 1479, on the Breadfield near the Saxon village of Alkenyér (also Zsibód, German: Unterbrodsdorf, Romanian: Șibot) next to the river Maros (Mureș). The Hungarian army was led by Pál Kinizsi, István Báthory, Vuk Branković, and Basarab Laiotă cel Bătrân.

The result of the battle was an important victory for the Kingdom of Hungary and the Serbian Despotate.

== Background ==
From his ascendence to the Hungarian throne in 1458, King Matthias fought with the Turks, and in 1463, he occupied the northern parts of Bosnia. However, this was not a full-scale war.

Turkish marauders attacked Transylvania and Vojvodina several times between 1474 and 1475. The attacks led to the depopulation of some areas with a number of villages abandoned by their inhabitants.

After the Ottoman–Venetian War (1463–79) in the spring of 1479, a major Ottoman army convened under Szendrő (today Smederevo, Serbia), above all, Akıncıs. When King Matthias was alerted, according to the testament of Miklós Pozsegai, made in Garignica on 11 July, he ordered Stephen V Báthory, the Voivode of Transylvania and his general Pál Kinizsi to mobilize.

The Ottoman army entered Transylvania on 9 October near Kelnek (Câlnic), led by Ali Koca Bey. The Akıncıs attacked a few villages, homesteads, and market towns, taking a number of Hungarians, Vlachs, and Saxons captive. On 13 October Koca Bey set up his camp in the Breadfield (Kenyérmező), near Zsibót. Koca Bey was obliged into the campaign by the insistence of Basarab cel Tânăr, a Wallachian prince, who himself brought 1,000–2,000 infantry to the cause.

The Turks continued pillaging and taking prisoners, while Báthory and Kinizsi made preparations to set forth against the Turks.

== Hungarian and Ottoman armies ==
The numerical strength of the Ottoman army is under debate; one estimate judged them to be 60,000, while Hungarian sources placed them closer to 30,000. Jan Długosz, the famous Polish chronicler, estimated the Ottoman forces to have been 100,000 men-at-arms, but Matthias Corvinus estimated in his letters that there were 43–45,000 Ottoman and Wallachian soldiers. A more probable number for Ottoman forces was between 6-20 thousand soldiers, and 1,000-2,000 Wallachians. The Ottoman army was almost entirely made up of Akıncıs, Rumelian Spakhs, and Azaps, with some Janissaries and possibly some cannon. The Ottoman enterprise was not a full-fledged war effort, but rather a very substantial raiding one - the largest expedition Transylvania encountered during a century's worth of Hungarian-Turkish conflicts.

Kinizsi's army consisted of Hungarian, Szekler, Serbian, Transylvanian Saxon forces, and some Vlach volunteers. The latter were commanded by Basarab Laiotă "cel Bătrân", lit. "the Elder", quondam ruler of Wallachia and archrival to Basarab "cel Tânăr", lit. "the Younger". Accordingly, the younger Basarab insisted on equality with the older, with only one being tenable to the Wallachian throne. The combined Christian forces totalled approximated 12,000 to 15,000 men. In the judgement of some, Poles, Moldavians, Ruthenians, Lithuanians, Germans, and Bohemians were privy in part to the battle, but this is rather difficult to substantiate.

== Battle ==
On 9 October the Turkish army entered Hungary and began raiding. Báthory waited until the Turks got exhausted in marching and raiding, and once the Ottomans had collected too much loot to move fast enough, he attacked them on 13 October.

Both armies were composed of three columns. The right flank of the Hungarian army was led by Kinizsi, the left was the Serbian light cavalry under Vuk Grgurević and Demetrius Jakšić with the Saxons and Báthory's forces in the center. On the Ottoman side, Koca Bey took the left flank, Isa Bey the center, and Malkoch Oglu the right flank.

The battle commenced in the afternoon. Báthory fell from his horse and the Ottomans nearly captured him, but a nobleman called Antal Nagy whisked the voivode away. Having joined battle, the Ottomans were in ascendancy early on, but Kinizsi charged against the Turks with the Hungarian heavy cavalry and 900 Serbs under Jakšić assisted by "numerous courtiers of the king". Ali Bey was forced to retreat. Kinizsi moved laterally to vigorously smash the Turkish center and before long Isa Bey also withdrew. The few Turks who survived the massacre fled into the mountains, where the majority were killed by the local men. The hero of the battle was Pál Kinizsi, the legendary Hungarian general and a man of Herculean strength in the service of Matthias Corvinus' Black Army of Hungary.

== Aftermath ==
Ottoman casualties were extremely high with several thousand men killed, among them Malkoçoğlu and Isa Bey along with two beys and a thousand of their Wallachian allies. Hungarian forces lost approximately 3,000 men in the battle. A few prisoners were liberated and their ransom was immense.

In 1480 Kinizsi raided Serbia and several times defeated Ali Koca Bey. The battle of Breadfield was a great psychological victory for the Hungarians, and as a result the Ottoman Turks did not attack southern Hungary and Transylvania for many years thereafter.

== Gallery ==
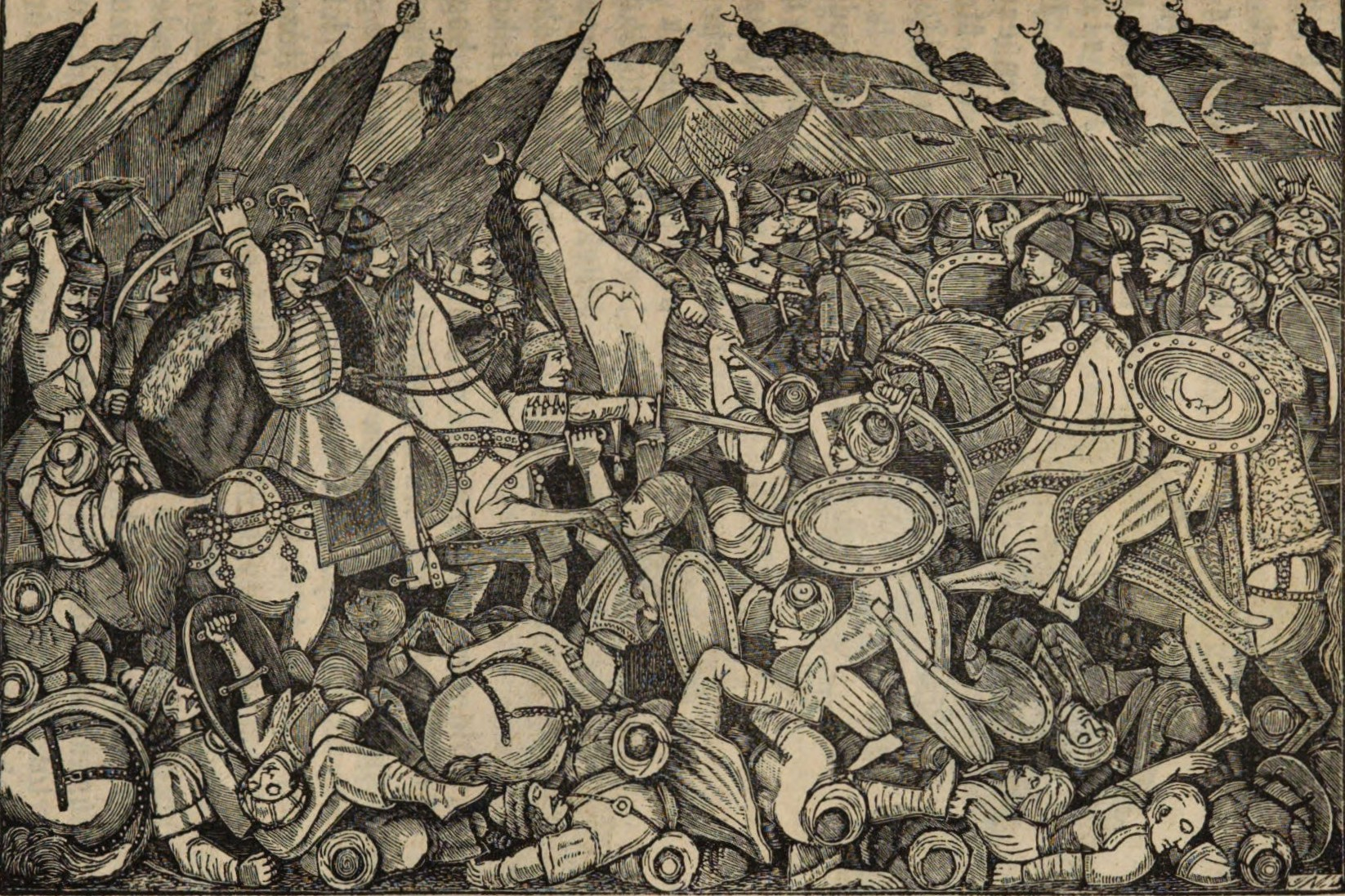
Battle of Breadfield

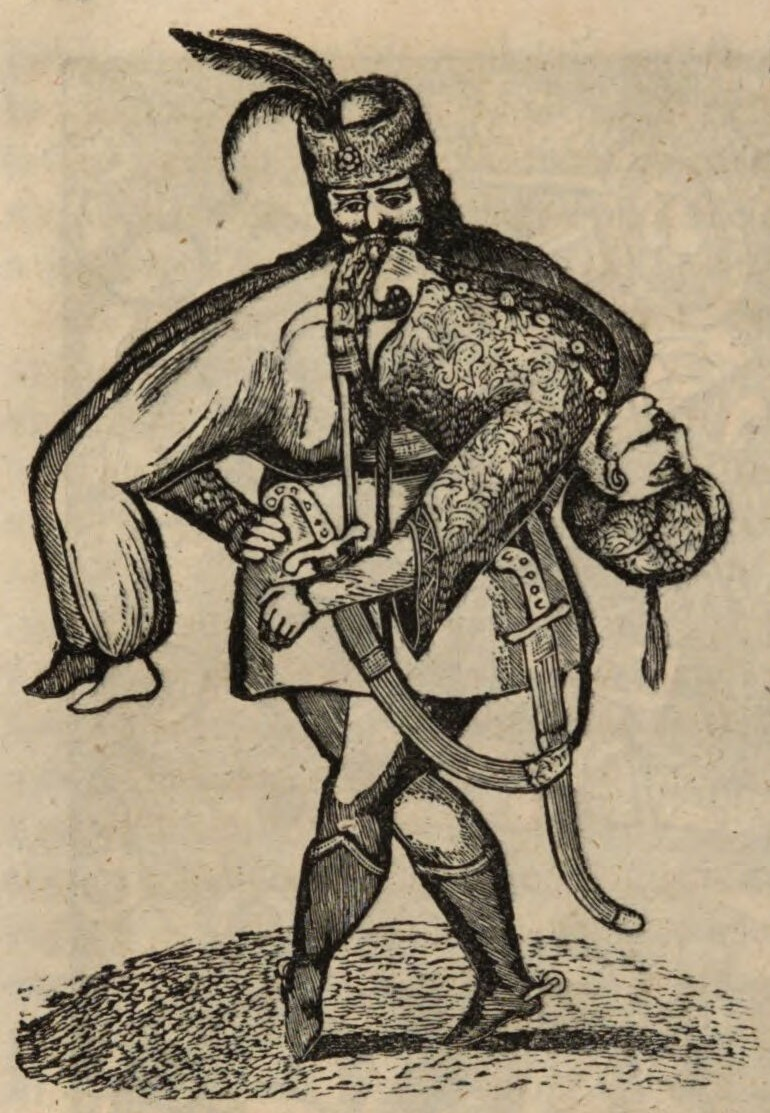
Pál Kinizsi holds a dead Turk in his teeth after the Battle of Breadfield

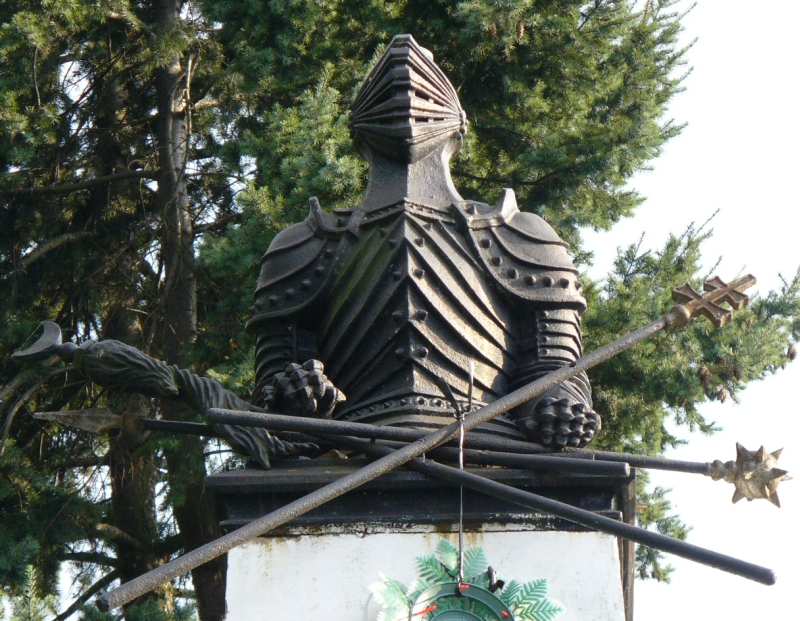
Bust of Pál Kinizsi at the memorial of the Battle of Breadfield (now Șibot, Romania) (created by Lajos Caprini in 1888)

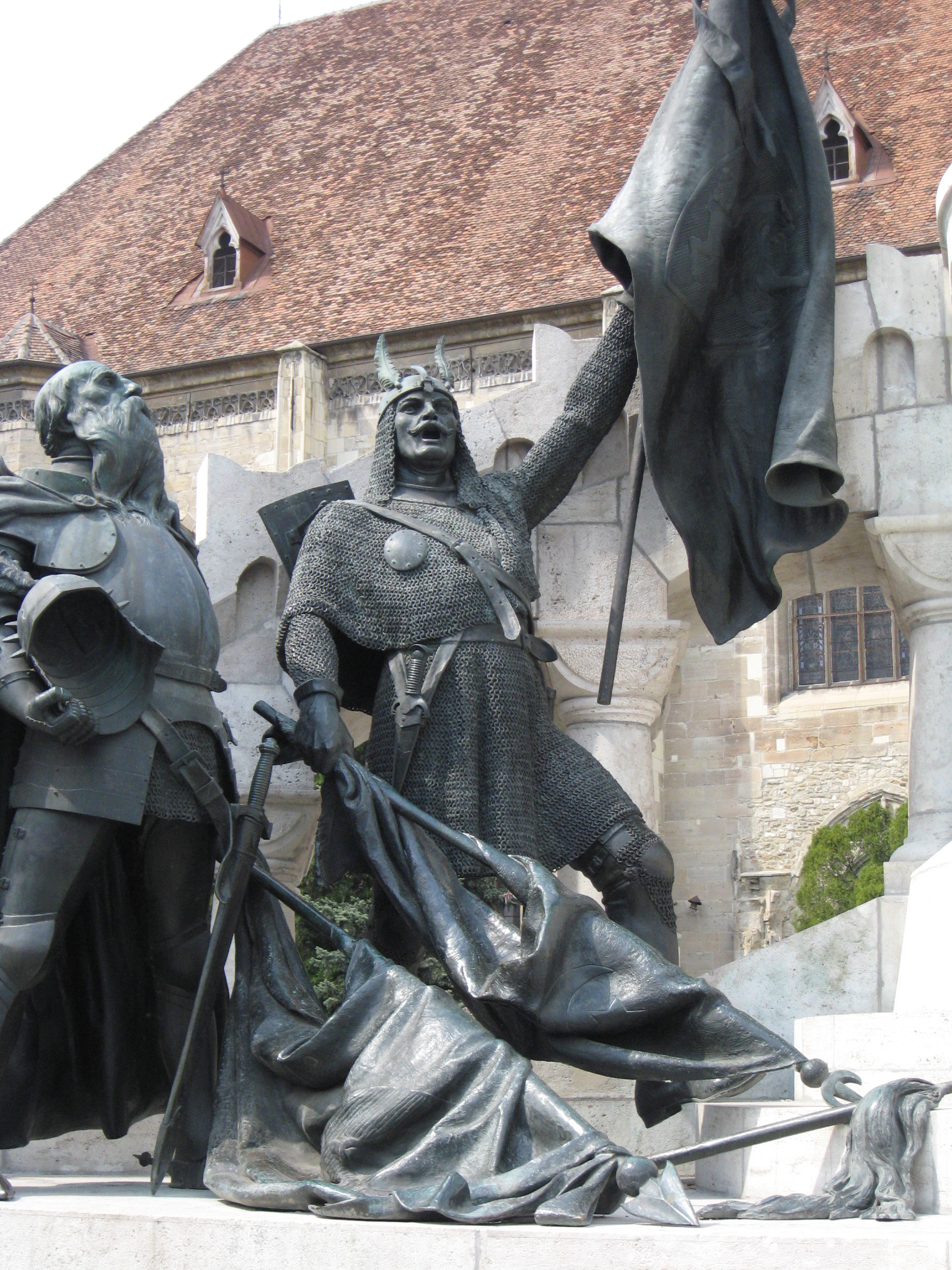
Statue of Pál Kinizsi on the Matthias Corvinus Monument, (now Cluj-Napoca, Romania) (created by János Fadrusz in 1902)

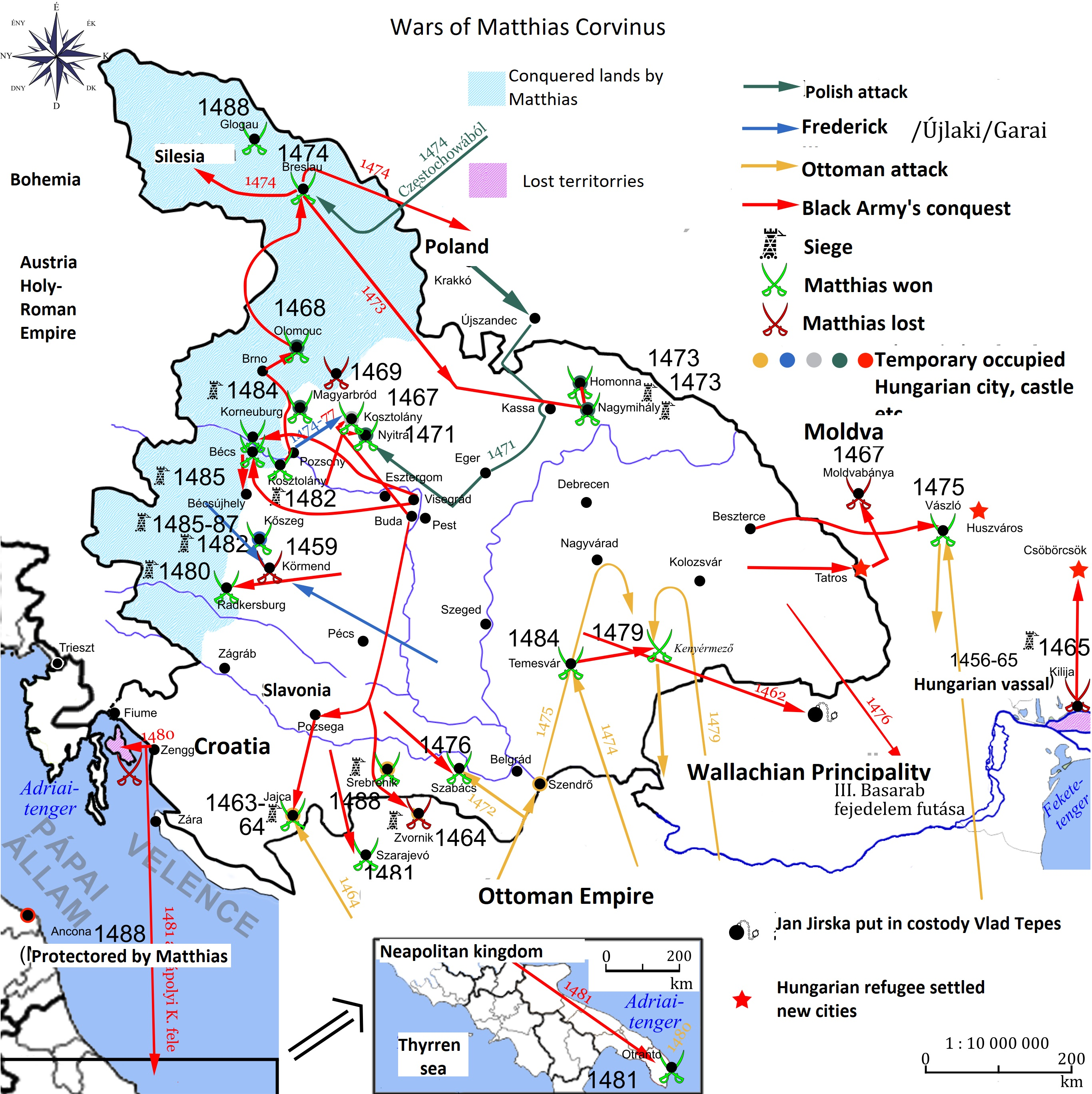
Campaigns of King Matthias Corvinus of Hungary

== See also ==
- List of battles 1301–1600
- Breadfield

== Bibliography ==
- Kármán, Gábor; Kunčevic, Lovro, eds. (2013). The European Tributary States of the Ottoman Empire in the Sixteenth and Seventeenth Centuries. Leiden: Brill. ISBN 9789004246065.
- Lengyel, Dénes (1972). Régi Magyar mondák. Budapest: Móra Ferenc. ISBN 963-11-2928-4.
- Csorba, Csaba; János Estók; Konrád Salamon (1998). Magyarország Képes Története. Budapest: Hungarian Book-Club. ISBN 963-548-961-7.
- Babinger, Franz (1978). Mehmed the Conqueror and his time. Princeton University Press. ISBN 0-691-01078-1.
