= Pál Kinizsi =

Hungarian general

- Count (comes) and Captain-General (generalis capitaneus)
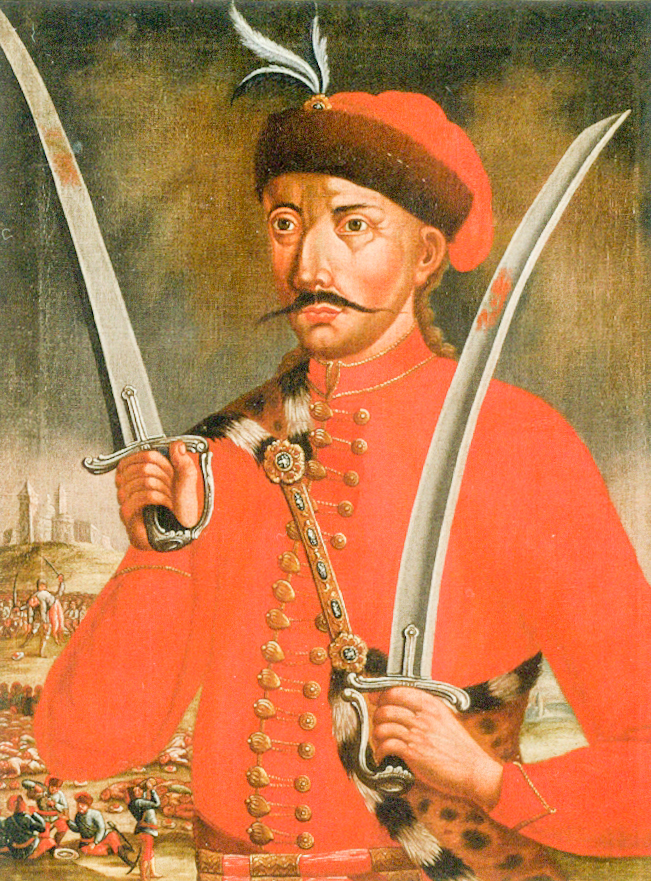
- Pál Kinizsi in a Romantic painting depicting him in 17th-century Hussar uniform.

Judge royal
- Reign: January–November 1494
- Predecessor: Stephen Báthory
- Successor: Peter Geréb
- Born: 1432
- Died: 14/26 November 1494
- Buried: December 1594; Pauline monastery of Nagyvázsony, Hungary
- Spouse: Benigna Magyar
- Occupation: Hungarian magnate and general
- Memorials: Statue in Budapest by János Pásztor (1930)

Pál Kinizsi (Latin: Paulus de Kenezy; 1432–1494) was a Hungarian general in the service of Hungarian army under king Matthias Corvinus. He was the Count of Temes County, located in the Banat region in the Kingdom of Hungary (now part of Romania and Serbia following the Treaty of Trianon in 1920) from 1484 and Captain-General of the Lower Parts of the Kingdom. He was a general of the famed Black Army of Hungary during the reign of King Mathias Corvinus. He is famous for his victory over the Ottomans in the Battle of Breadfield in October 1479. Kinizsi is widely praised for his role in defending Hungary from the Ottomans. He reputedly never lost a battle.

== Life ==
=== Origin and early life ===
Coat of arms of Kinizsi

Kinizsi's ancestry is obscure. According to some he was a son of a miller, and prior to his military career, he was a journeyman miller. The available old documents from the Hungarian National Archives suggest that Paul Kinizsi was born into a Hungarian noble family from Abaúj County in northern part of the Kingdom of Hungary. According to the research of contemporary Hungarian historians, Pál Kinizsi was of Hungarian nationality and was most likely born in Abaúj County, in the village of either Kiskinizs or Nagykinizs. Scholars have been able to trace the genealogy of the Kinizsi family back to the thirteenth century, where the possible presence of Germanic elements—and to a lesser degree perhaps Slavic ones—cannot be entirely excluded. In Kinizsi’s time, the ethnic composition of Abaúj County was predominantly Hungarian, with some German communities, particularly in the vicinity of Hernádnémeti. His Hungarian mother tongue and Catholic faith are further supported by the fact that in the 1480s Kinizsi founded a monastery for the Pauline Order at Nagyvázsony, an order of distinctly Hungarian origin, where he also chose his final resting place.

The first mention of his name is in 1464, in a Latin written document mentioning that Egrenius (His Excellency) Paulus de Kenezy receives a possession in the Abaúj County. Later in 1510, appears also in form of Paulo de Kynys Comiti Themesiensi et Generali Capetaneo partium Regni nostrum inferiorum.

In Romanian historiography, Paul Kinizsi was traditionally considered to have been born into a humble knezial family from Banat. However, according to Romanian historian Adrian Magina, this claim was inaccurate, and Kinizsi's only connection with the territory of Banat was his role as Count of Temes and general captain of the southern regions of the Kingdom of Hungary. According to some Serbian historians, he was of Serbian origin, and was possibly a descendant of Vuk Branković, though this could not be determined. After analysing historical documents, Serbian historian Aleksandar Ivanov reached the firm conclusion that Paul Kinizsi was neither of Serbian origin nor a native of Banat.

=== Military career ===
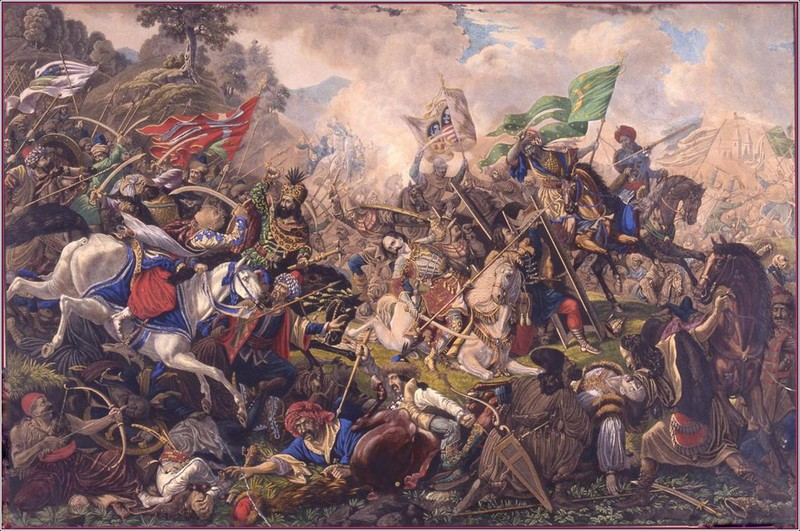
Battle of Breadfield

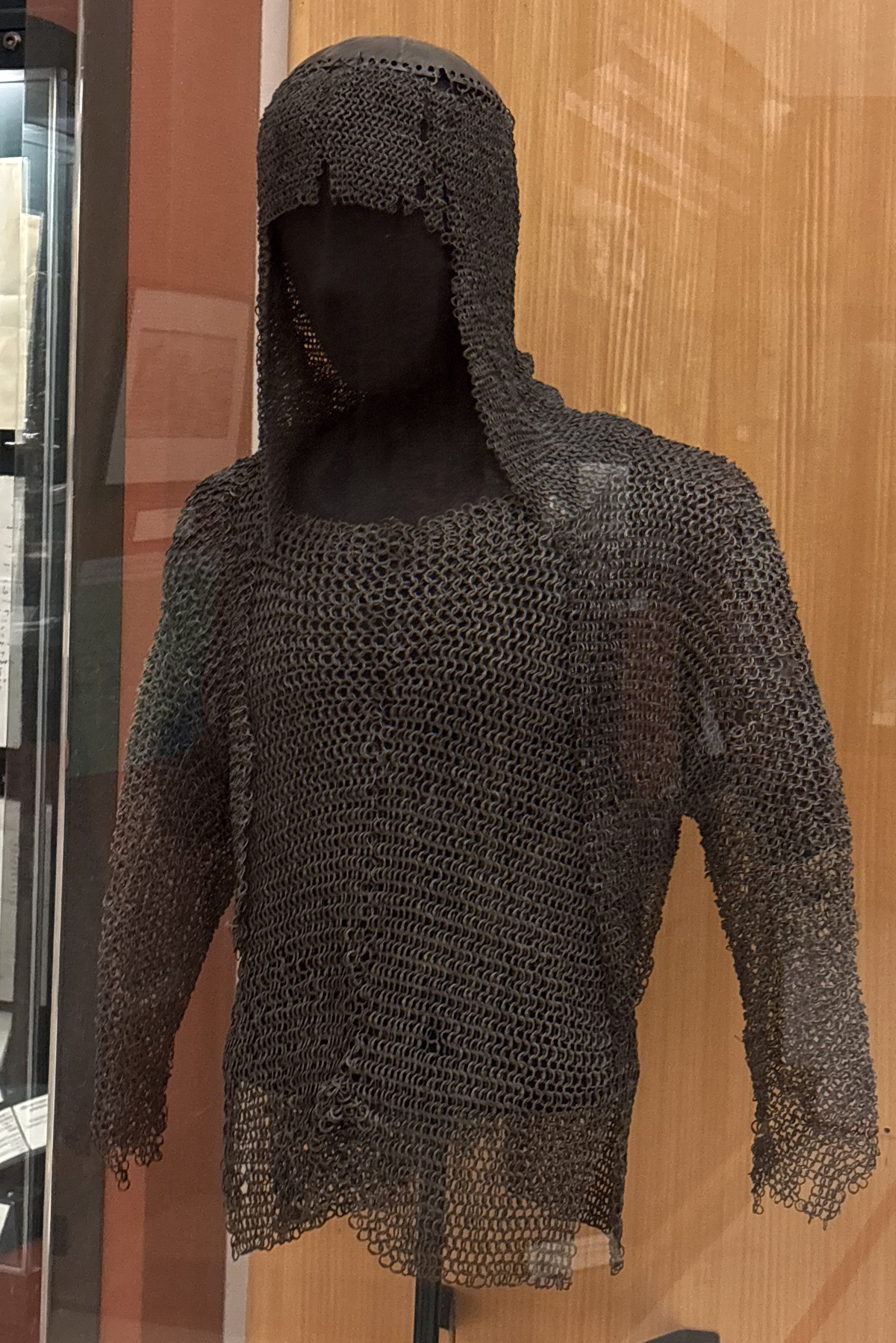
Chainmail shirt and mail coif of Pál Kinizsi

His central estate was the Castle of Nagyvázsony since 1472 until his death.

After the death of king Matthias in 1490 he supported the Bohemian king Vladislas II of Hungary and the great magnates against Matthias' illegitimate son and designated successor John Corvinus. Kinizsi defeated the army of John Corvinus in the battle of Bonefield. He destroyed the former king's mercenary Black Army (battle of Halászfalva) which had become a robber band after its dissolution. He then was crippled by a stroke and died shortly afterwards. He is one of the few generals in history who never lost a battle.

Kinizsi is widely praised for his role in defending the Kingdom of Hungary from the Ottomans. Kinizsi holds a distinguished place in Hungarian history, as numerous notable military achievements are associated with his name, and historians maintain that he never lost a single battle. A contemporary account by the court historian of King Matthias Corvinus, Antonio Bonfini, in Rerum Hungaricarum Decades vividly describes why he was so feared by his enemies:

Pál Kinizsi takes two swords in his hands, and, like a roaring lion, wades through blood everywhere. Wherever he charges, he is unstoppable, trampling all that he encounters, and in wide ranks he carries out tremendous slaughter and carnage.

— Antonio Bonfini: Rerum Hungaricarum decades

== Family ==
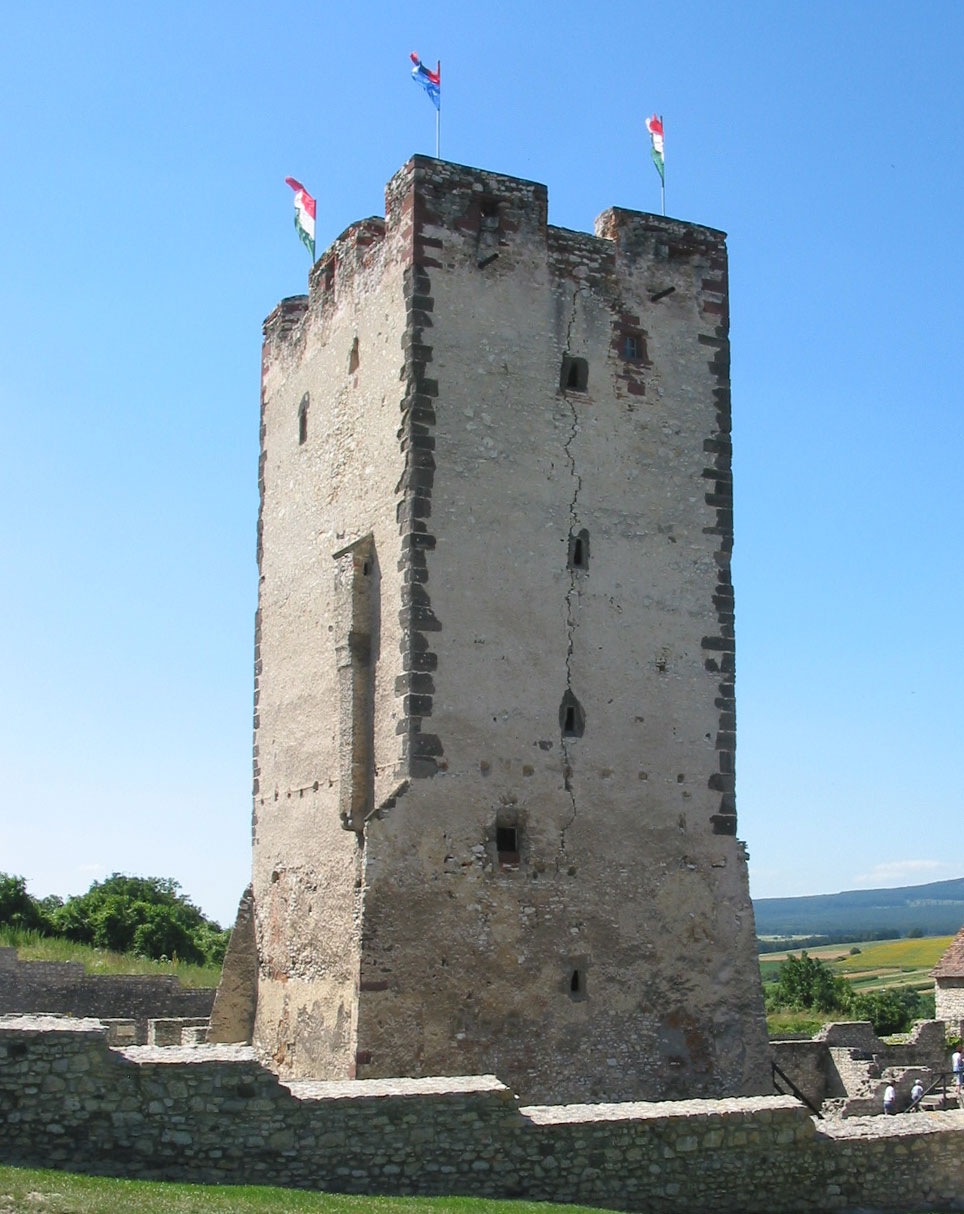
Kinizsi Castle

He married Benigna Magyar, the daughter of Blaise Magyar, another general of Corvinus.

== Titles ==
- "Count of Temes" (Latin: comes Temesiensis)
- "Captain General of the Lower Parts of the Kingdom of Hungary" (Latin: generalis capitaneus inferiorum partium regni)

== Folklore ==
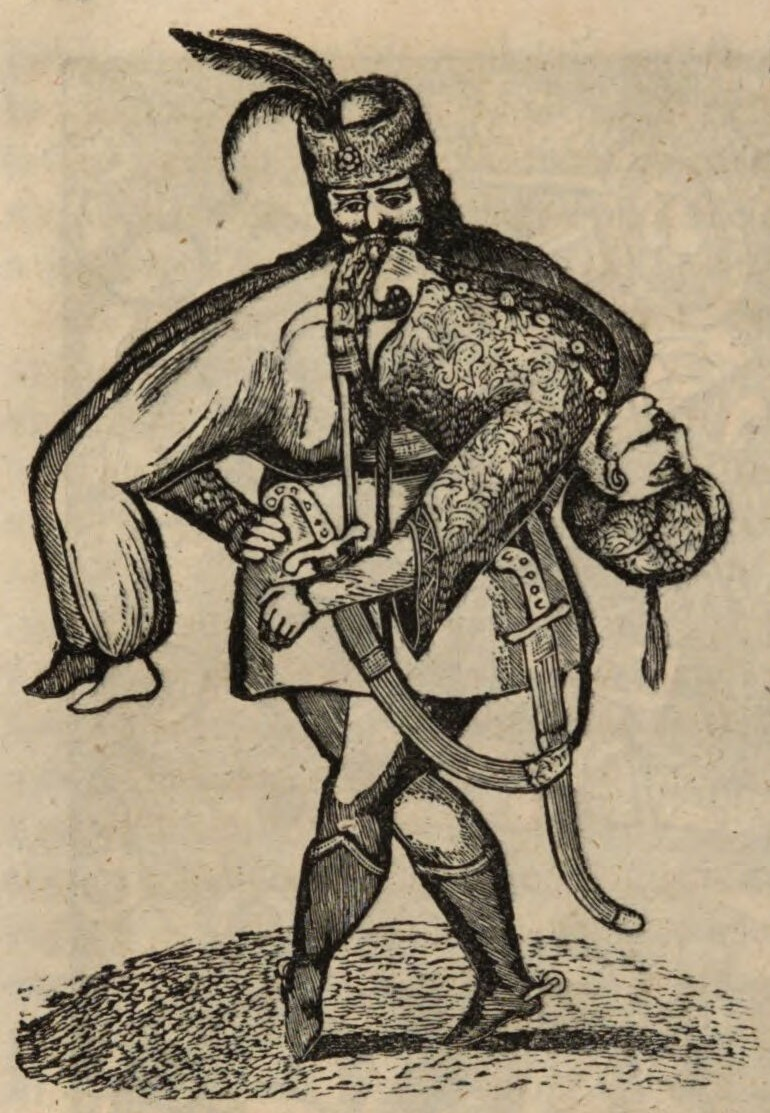
Pál Kinizsi holds a dead Turk in his teeth after the Battle of Breadfield

In legends, he is known as a commoner. Kinizsi is a hero of some Hungarian and Romanian folk tales along with king Matthias Corvinus as an extremely strong former miller's apprentice. According to these tales, the king was hunting in the Bakony forest near the mill where he worked and asked for a drink; Kinizsi, to show his strength, served the cup on a millstone. The king, impressed, took him into his service, where Kinizsi's strength, prowess and loyalty earned him rapid promotion. He is said to have wielded two greatswords in battle and to have danced a victory dance after the Battle of Kenyérmező with a captured or dead Turk under each arm and a third held with his hair or belt in his teeth.

== Tomb of Pál Kinizsi ==
The Nagyvázsony region was occupied by the Ottomans in the mid-16th century, and the surrounding Hungarian landowners chose to destroy the monastery founded by Pál Kinizsi to prevent it from being used as a fortress by the invaders. The marble tombs containing the ashes of Kinizsi and his successor remained undisturbed at the time, as local legends hold that the Ottomans feared their greatest adversary even in death. According to tradition, a janissary once fired at Kinizsi's marble tomb, but the bullet rebounded and killed him, suggesting that Kinizsi continued his bloodshed even after his death.

In the chapel of Kinizsi Castle at Nagyvázsony stands a carved sarcophagus depicting Pál Kinizsi. His body was originally interred in the Pauline monastery that he himself had founded. In 1708, however, treasure hunters desecrated his grave, removing his mail shirt, helmet, and two-handed sword. These objects later entered the collection of the Hungarian National Museum. The remains of Pál Kinizsi and his comrade, Márk Horváth, were subsequently reburied by the Zichy family’s estate steward in the cemetery of the Church of St. Stephen at Nagyvázsony, in an unmarked grave.,

On 22 August 2022, an archaeological excavation was launched in Nagyvázsony with the aim of locating the remains of the undefeated general. The project was organized under the auspices of the Fekete Sereg Youth Association, led by Ádám Sándor Pátkai and Zsombor Győrffy-Villám, with Dr. Csanád Kandikó serving as project director.

== Honors ==
The Hungarian Temesvári Kinizsi SE football club was established in 1910. Following the Treaty of Trianon in 1920, the city became the part of the Romania and the club was renamed to Chinezul Timișoara. The club played both in the Hungarian and the Romanian championship during its existence.

Postage stamps: Pál Kinizsi postage stamps were issued by Hungary on 1 January 1943 and in 1945. This same stamp was surcharged 28 fillér on 5 fillér and issued in 1945.

The Hungarian Defence Forces Kinizsi Pál 30th Armoured Infantry Brigade was originally established in 1951, operated until 2003, and was re-established in 2023. It is one of the largest ground military units of the Hungarian Defence Forces, operating under the direct command of the Land Forces Command. The brigade is named after Pál Kinizsi and is stationed in the garrison of Hódmezővásárhely. The Lynx infantry fighting vehicle is part of the brigade.

== Gallery ==
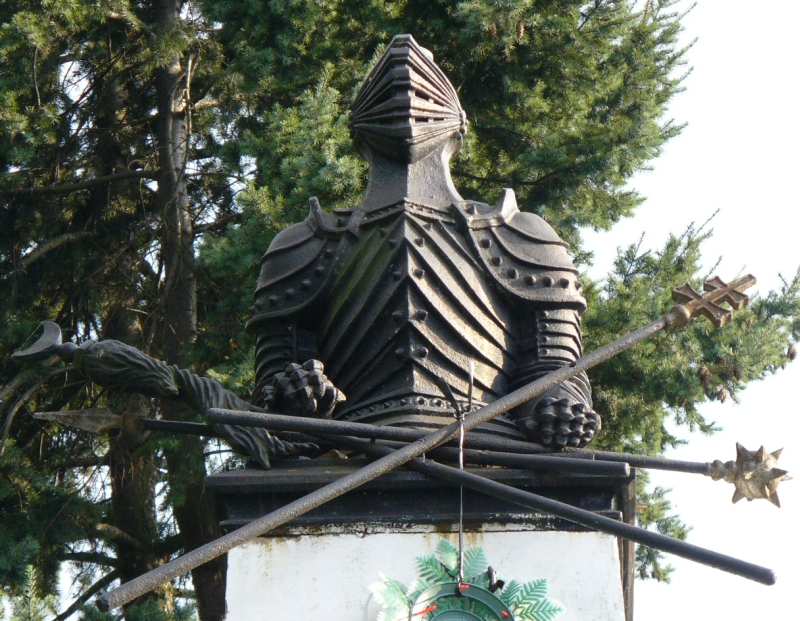
Bust of Pál Kinizsi at the memorial of the Battle of Breadfield (now Șibot, Romania) (created by Lajos Caprini in 1888)

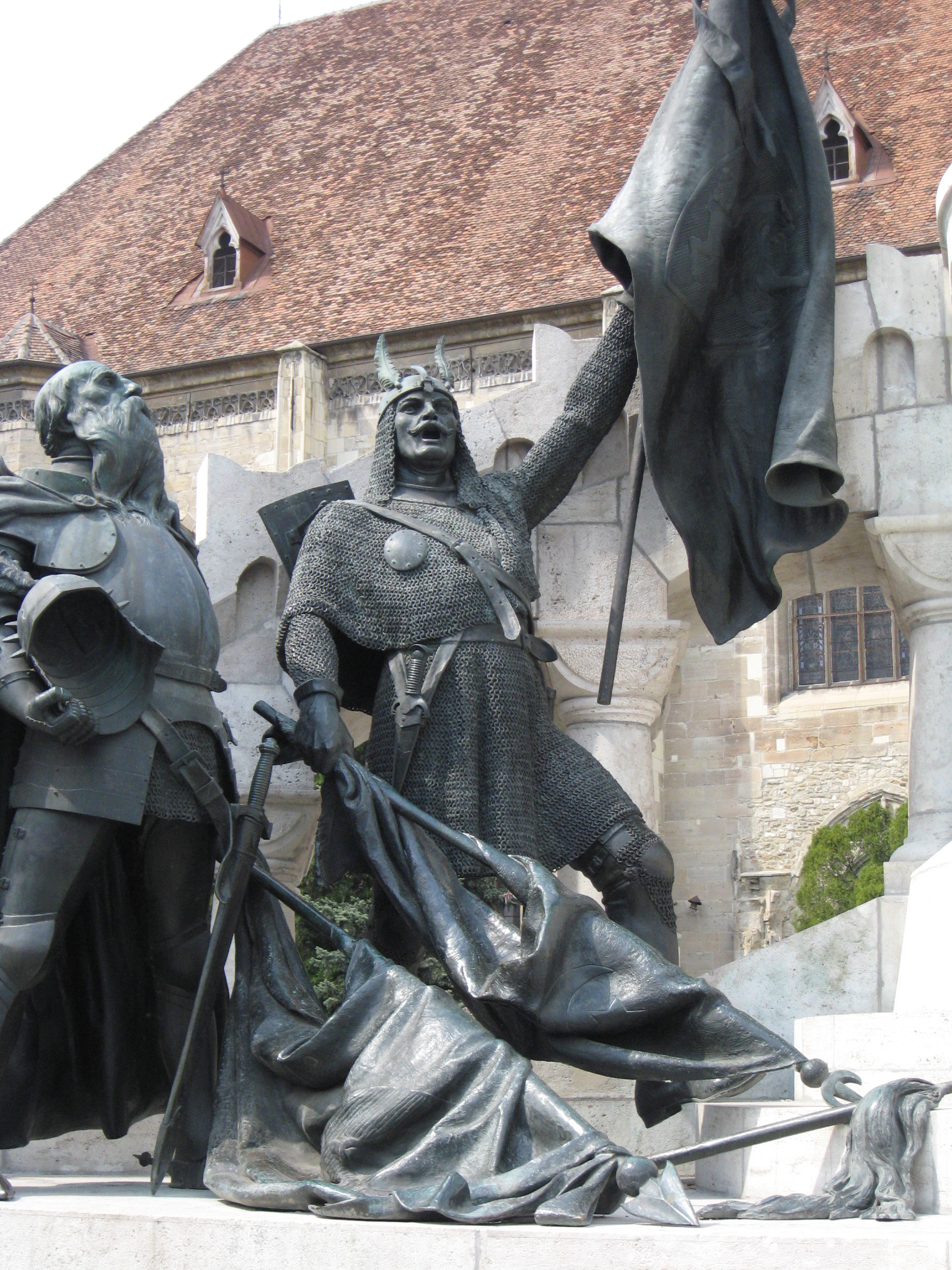
Statue of Pál Kinizsi on the Matthias Corvinus Monument, (now Cluj-Napoca, Romania) (created by János Fadrusz in 1902)

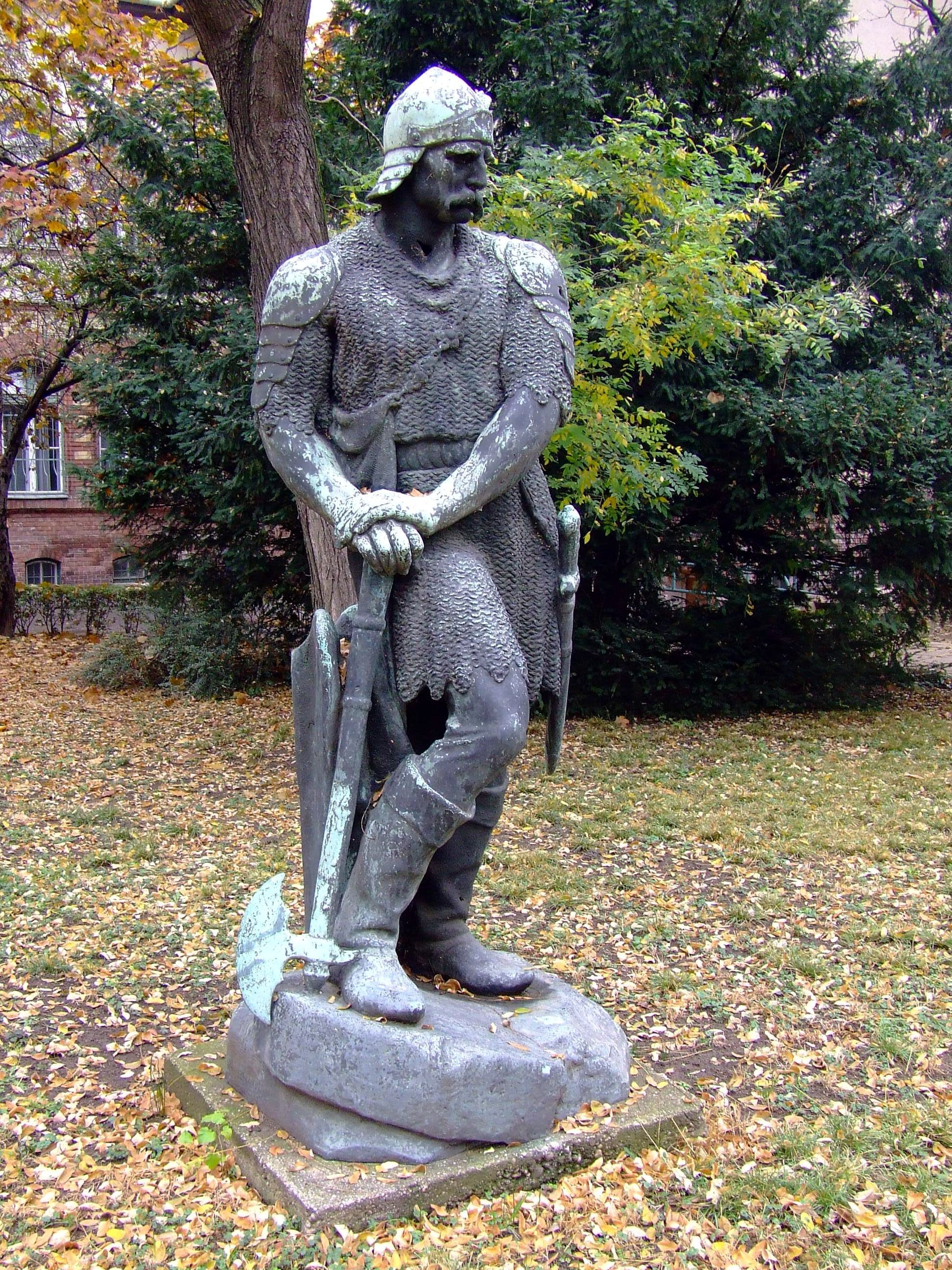
Statue of Pál Kinizsi at the Hungarian University of Sports Science, (Budapest, Hungary) (created by János Pásztor in 1930)

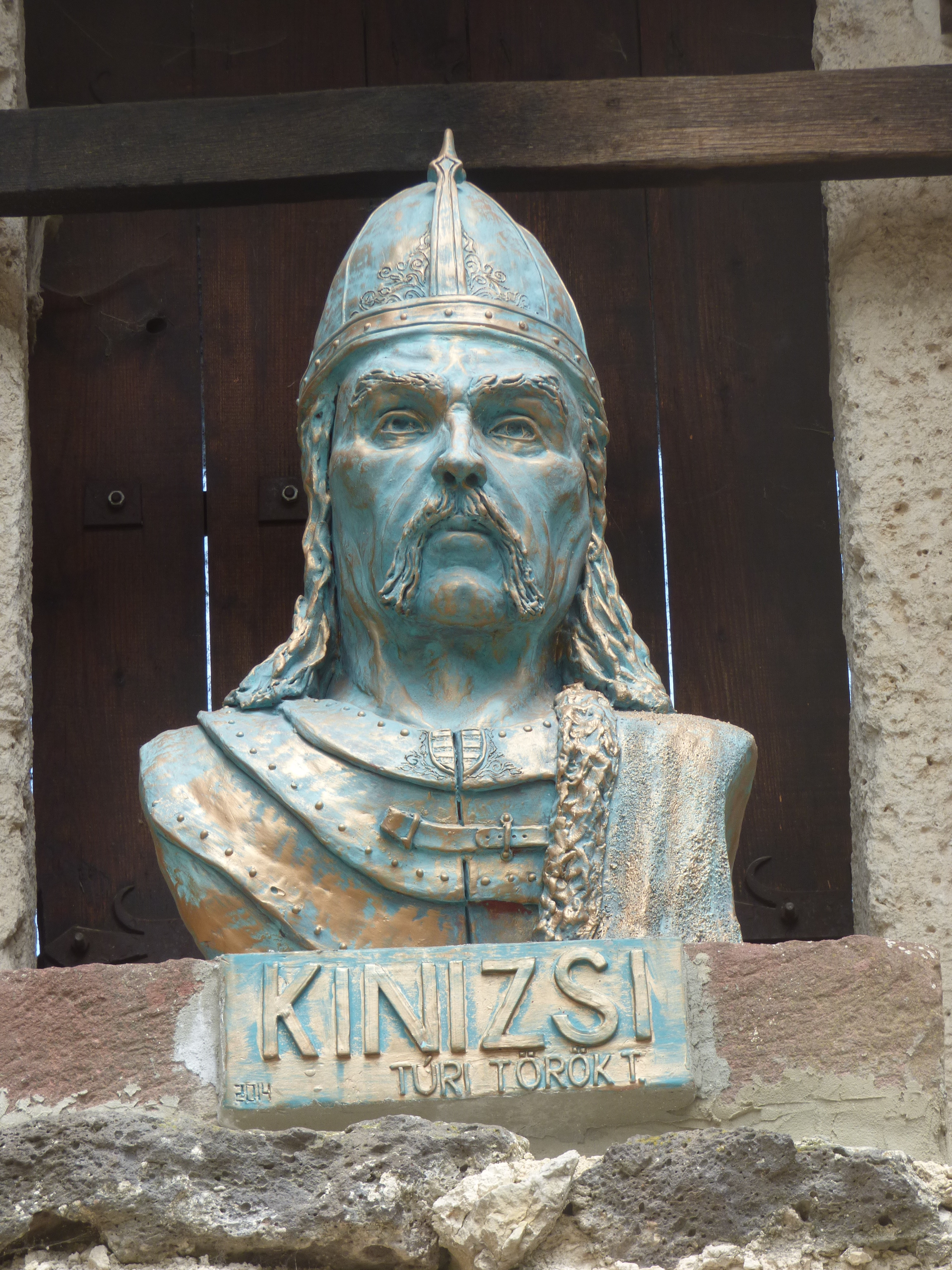
Bust of Pál Kinizsi above the gate of the Kinizsi Castle (Nagyvázsony, Hungary) (created by Tibor Túri Török in 2014)

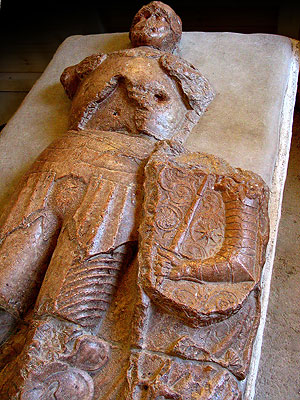
Tomb of Pál Kinizsi
