= Ernő Koch =

Hungarian artist

Ernő Koch (8 August 1898, in Szászváros, Austria-Hungary (now Orăștie, Romania) – 31 March 1970, in St. Louis, United States) was a Hungarian graphic artist.

Koch attended the Hungarian Royal Drawing School. As a student, he worked during the summers in printmaking plants and won several prizes for poster designs. The Hungarian National Bank invited him to participate in a competition for new treasury notes. He graduated from the academy in 1922. From 1921 to 1923, Koch worked for CHNOIN, the largest pharmaceutical-chemical factory in Hungary, the Hungarian Institute of Fighting Plant Disease and the Hungarian Ministry of Agriculture designing posters and packages with drawings of plant cross sections, insects and bacteria. Also, during this time Koch worked as an Industrial Artist providing illustrations of machines, aerial views and products.

In 1923 Koch was invited to go to Estonia by Hungarian professor Csekey to illustrate his book on Estonia and Finland. He stayed in Estonia from 1926 to 1940, where he made many drawings of well known places. He worked for companies such as Kiviõli Shale Oil Refinery (Eesti Kiviõli) and Lorup Glass Factory. His drawings, woodcuts and etchings were used as publicity material, Christmas cards and pamphlets. The Hansa publishing house commissioned Koch to illustrate books. While in Estonia he also worked in close connection with architects rendering perspective drawings. In 1928, Koch met, and one year later, married Elsa Holzinger. On many occasions Koch made trips to Finland on assignments to draw horses for the Army and the Finnish Horse Breeders Association. His works have been exhibited in several museums in Estonia as well.

In 1937, the Republic of Estonia and the Kingdom of Hungary signed an agreement regarding intellectual co-operation between the countries. In September 1938 the "Hungarian Art Exhibition in Tallinn" opened, and was attended by Estonian President Konstantin Päts as well as various diplomats and ministers. Ernő Koch displayed paintings at this show, and personally described his works to President Päts.

Koch returned to Budapest in 1941 during the Soviet invasion of Estonia. In Budapest, he was commissioned by the Budapest Municipal Government to execute a series of cityscape etchings. In addition, he received numerous commissions from factories, especially the paper and steel mills. He worked in Budapest until 1944 when the Soviet Army invaded Hungary. Koch fled to Germany with his two young daughters, Ilma and Edith. As a refugee, he and his daughters stayed in a displaced persons camp for several years.

Ernő Koch immigrated to the United States in 1950 and lived in Florida until 1952. In 1952 he married Estonian J. K. in New York and moved to Chicago where he worked for Karl Hackert Inc., a firm that designed stained glass windows, altars and mosaics for churches. He was commissioned by a Boston architectural firm to design a mosaic ceiling depicting twenty Polish saints for the Basilica of the National Shrine of the Immaculate Conception in Washington, D.C.

In 1958 he moved his family to St. Louis, where he became the principal designer in the studio of the Jacoby Art Class Company, until his retirement in 1964. During his spare time and after retirement, he continued as a freelance artist and exhibited his paintings, etchings and woodcuts. In his last few years, he specialized in welded sculpture at his studio in Brentwood, Missouri and was affiliated with the Sculptors Gallery.

Works by Koch can be found in churches, museums and private collections throughout the United States, Canada and Europe. By 1959, Koch had established himself as a prominent local artist in St. Louis. Some examples of his stained glass windows can be found at the Basilica of the National Shrine of the Immaculate Conception, Washington, D.C.; Basilica y Parroquia La Purisima Concepcion, Monterrey, Mexico; Chapel of the Alexian Brothers Hospital, St. Louis; Chancery Office of the Archdiocese of St. Louis; and St. Augustine Episcopal Church, Wilmette, Illinois. Some examples of his sculptures can be found at Concordia Seminary, St. Louis; Boone County National Bank, Columbia, Missouri; Commercial Bank & Trust Co., Muskogee, Oklahoma and St. Louis Electric Company, St. Louis, Missouri.

I knew and worked for Ernő in his Brentwood studio from 1966 to 1969, when I was a student at Concordia Seminary, Saint Louis, Missouri. Ernő always spoke about going to art school in or nearby Sopron, Hungary. From 1966 through 1969 he produced several large welded pieces, often using birds as a thematic device. [Ernő's welded pieces were exhibited and handled by the Sculptor's Gallery on Locust in Saint Louis.] It was during the same period that he printed a group of multi-block, multi-colored old and new testament themed woodcuts from plates which he had cut in 1961–1962. Prior to 1966 he had only printed proofs of the woodcuts. Ernő would pick us up from the seminary on Saturday mornings about 6am; stop at the donut store for "starch" (usually a dozen donuts) and head for the Brentwood studio where we'd spend the day printing the woodcuts which were eventually exhibited at the seminary library.

Following Koch's death, his unfinished commissions were completed by Jim Nickel, a sculptor currently living and working in New York City who is exhibited by the Atrium Gallery, Saint Louis. Nickel, who understood his work best, took over Koch's Brentwood studio space before permanently moving to New York.
