= Nagyvázsony =

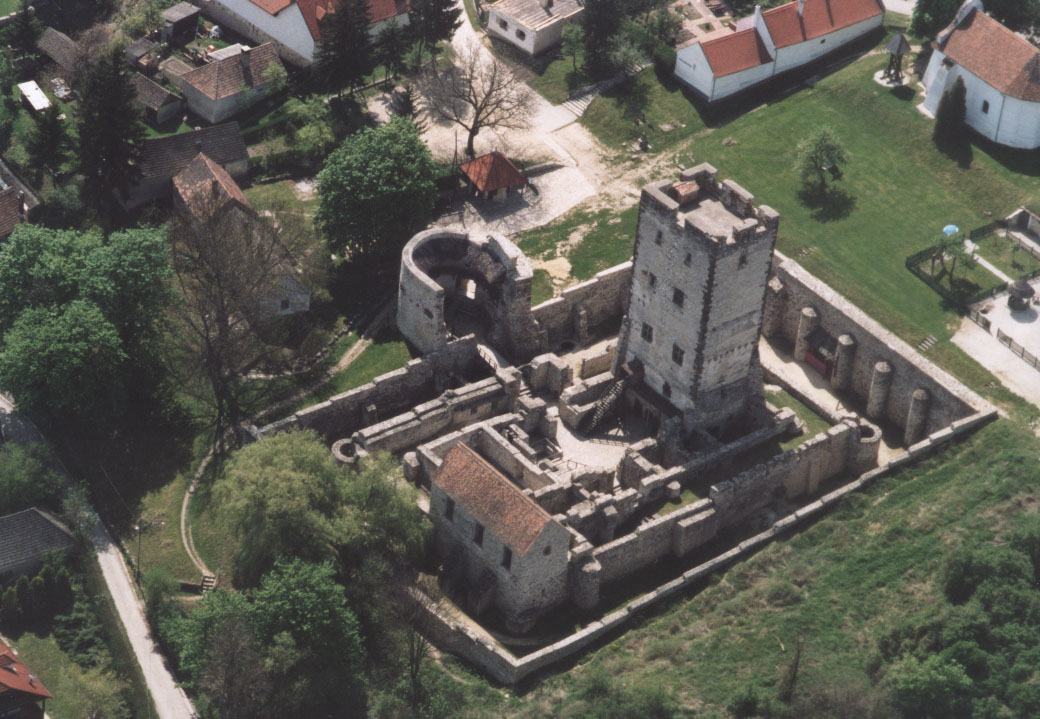
- Aerial photography of the castle of Nagyvázsony

- Flag Coat of arms

- Location of Veszprém county in Hungary

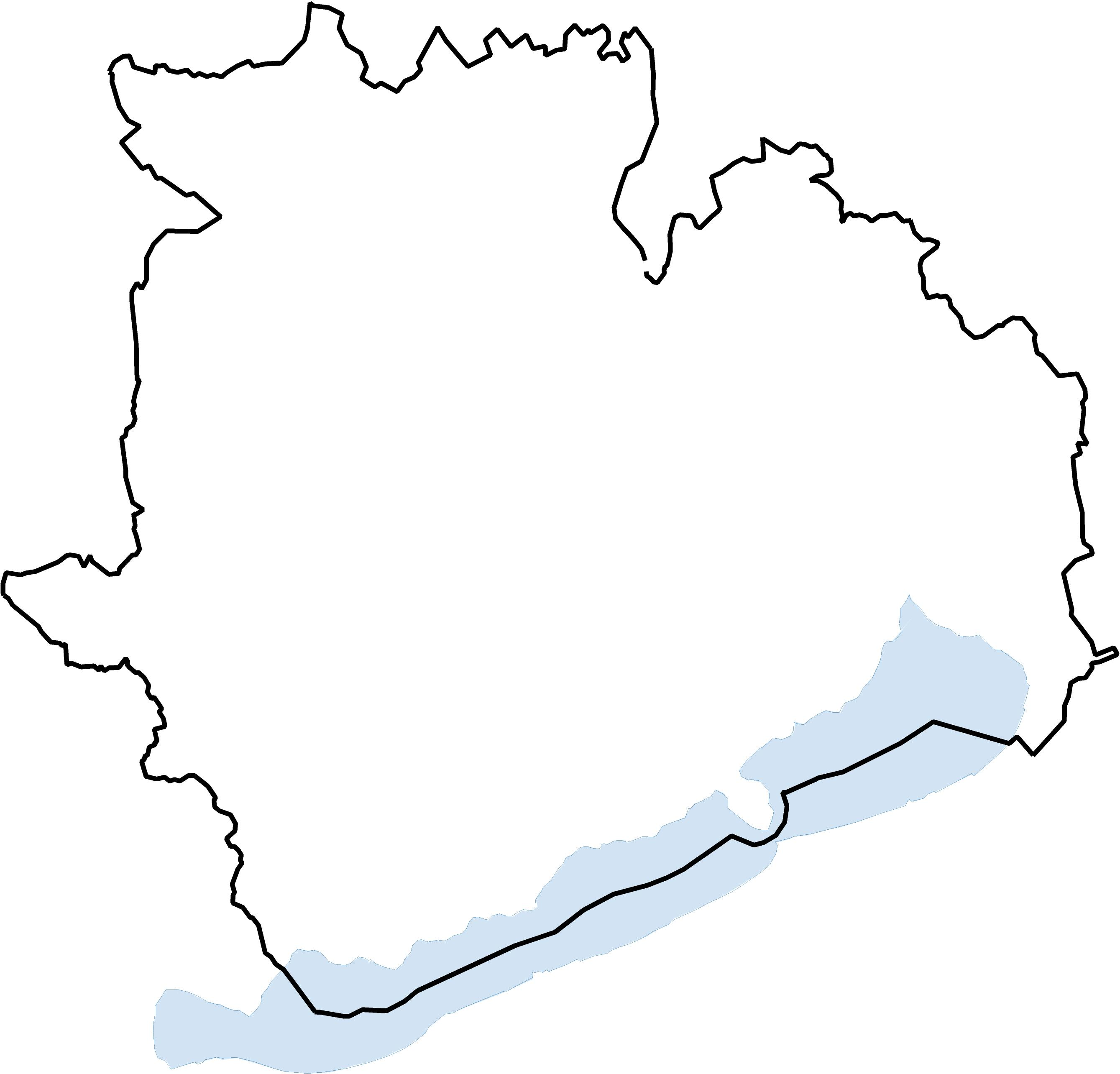
- Location of Nagyvázsony Nagyvázsony (Hungary)
- Coordinates: 46.98350°N 17.69408°E
- Country: Hungary
- County: Veszprém

Area
  - Total: 76.29 km^{2} (29.46 sq mi)

Population (2004)
  - Total: 1,848
  - Density: 24.22/km^{2} (62.7/sq mi)
- Time zone: UTC+1 (CET)
  - Summer (DST): UTC+2 (CEST)
- Postal code: 8291
- Area code: 88

Nagyvázsony is a village in Veszprém, Hungary. It lies approximately 15 km (9 mi) north of the Lake Balaton. It houses Kinizsi Castle, a 14th-century fortification donated by Matthias I to Pál Kinizsi. Kinizsi's sarcophagus can be found in the castle chapel. Facing the castle is a baroque church which was commissioned by Kinizsi in 1470. There is also an ethnographic museum in the village.

== Notable residents ==
- Teddy Kollek (1911–2007), Israeli Mayor of Jerusalem
- Pál Kinizsi (1432–1494), general

== Gallery ==
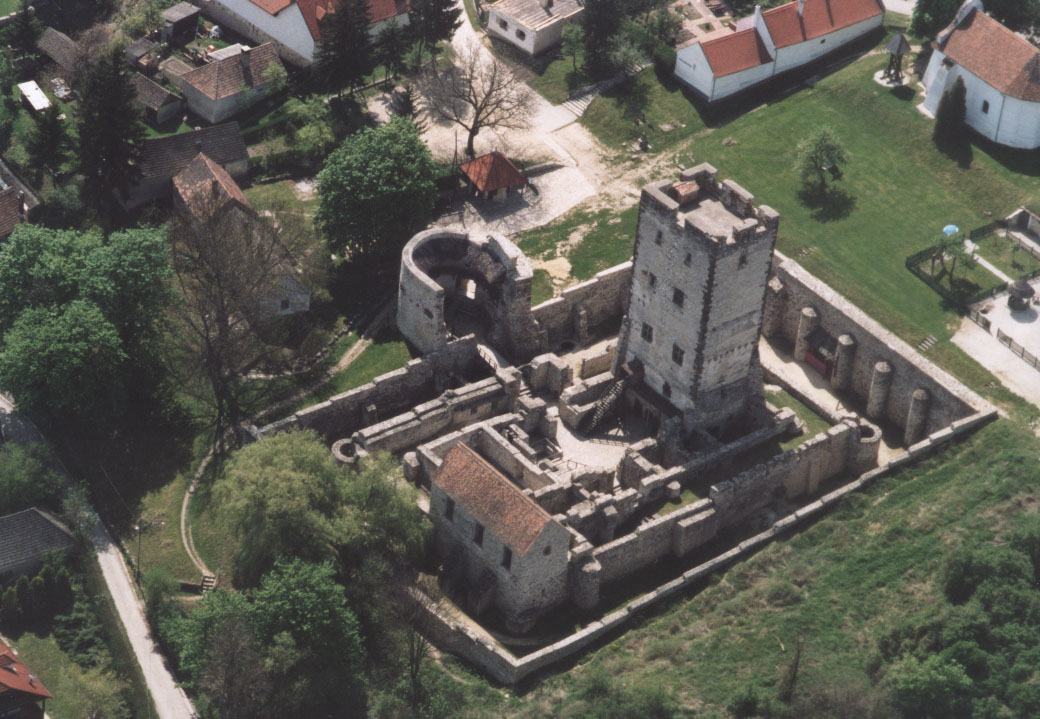

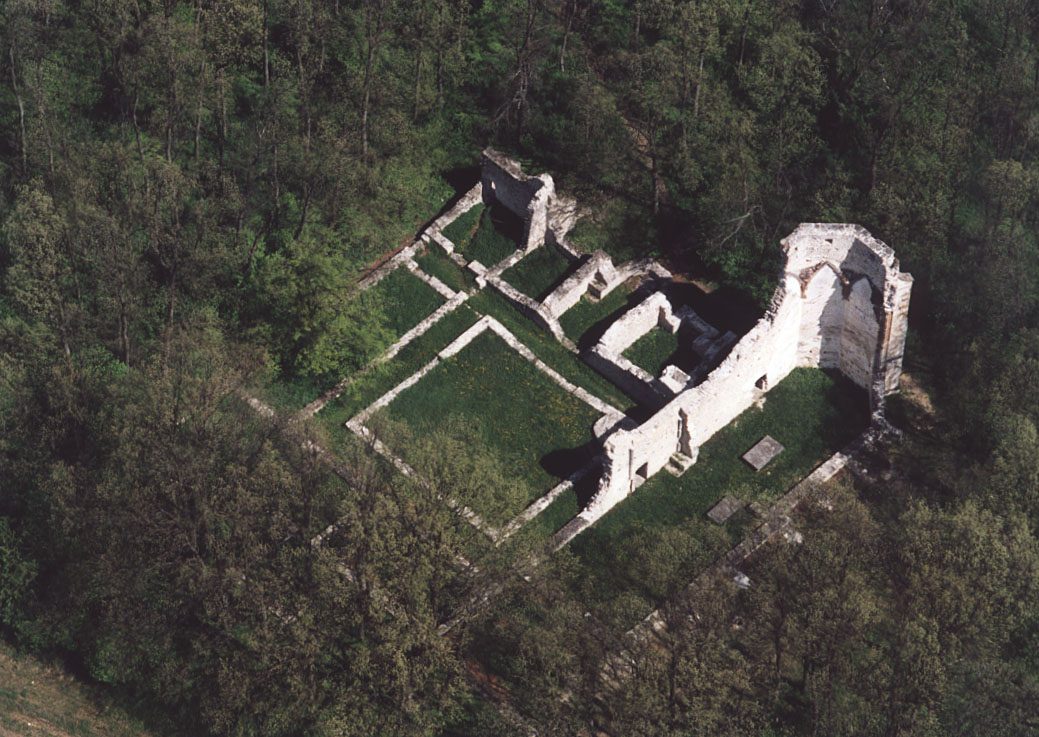

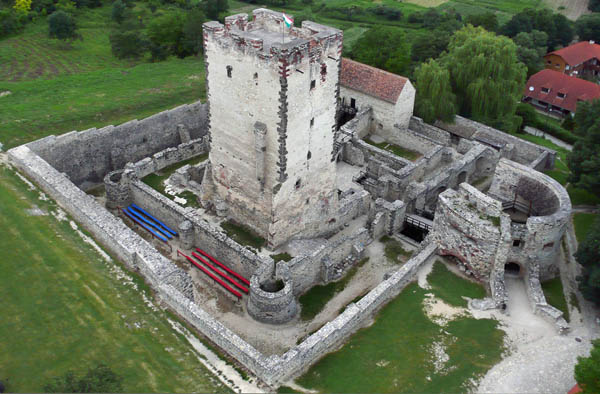

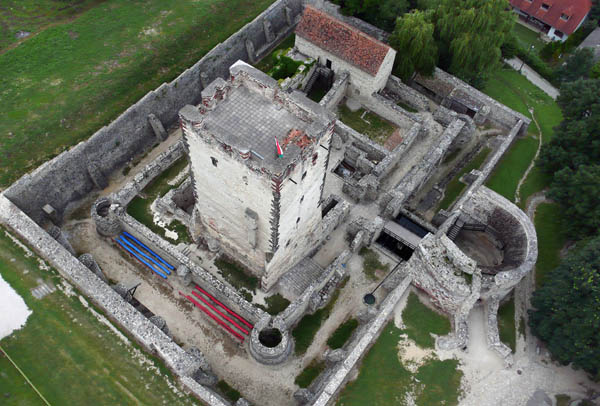

== Twin city ==
- Mioveni – Romania
- Chorley – United Kingdom
