= Șibot =

- Commune
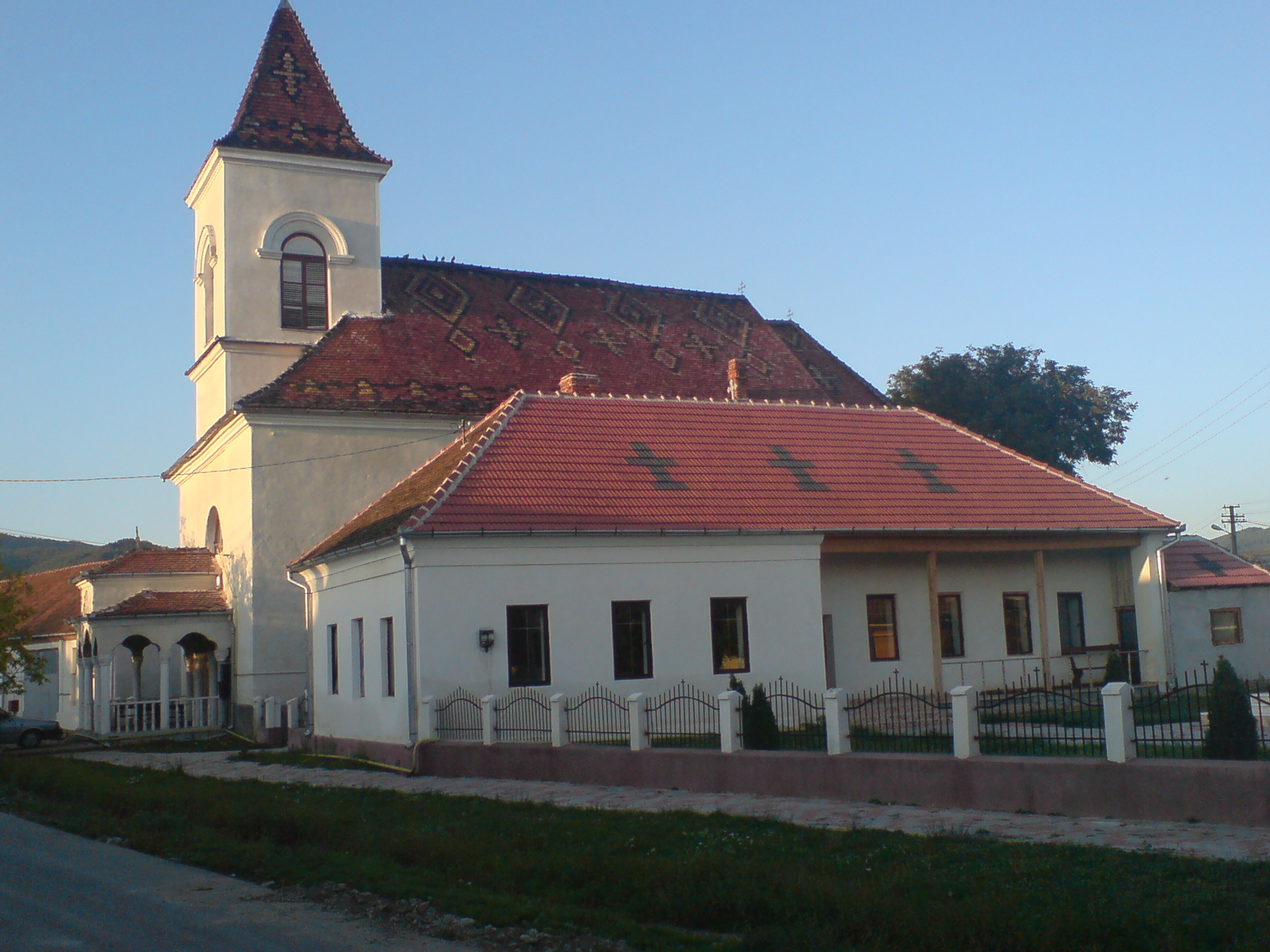
- Orthodox Church in Șibot village

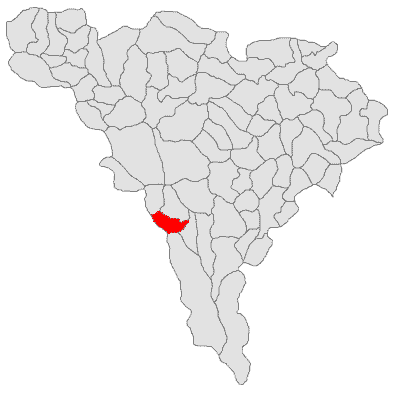
- Location in Alba County

- Location in Romania
- Coordinates: 45°57′N 23°20′E
- Country: Romania
- County: Alba

Government
  - Mayor (2020–2024): Marinela Oană (PNL)
- Area: 41.72 km^{2} (16.11 sq mi)
- Elevation: 250 m (820 ft)
- Population (2021-12-01): 2,100
  - Density: 50/km^{2} (130/sq mi)
- Time zone: UTC+02:00 (EET)
  - Summer (DST): UTC+03:00 (EEST)
- Postal code: 517750
- Area code: (+40) 02 58
- Vehicle reg.: AB
- Website: primaria-sibot.ro

Șibot (German: Unterbrodsdorf, Unter-Brotfeld; Hungarian: Alkenyér or Zsibotalkenyér) is a commune located in Alba County, Transylvania, Romania. It is composed of four villages: Băcăinți (Bocksdorf, Bokajalfalu), Balomiru de Câmp (Ballendorf, Balomir), Sărăcsău (Szarakszó), and Șibot.

The commune is located in the western part of Alba County, 28 km (17 mi) southwest of the county seat, Alba Iulia, on the border with Hunedoara County. Șibot is situated at an altitude of 240 m (790 ft), at the eastern end of the Metaliferi Mountains. It lies in the fertile Breadfield plain, on the banks of the Mureș River and its left tributary, the Cugir River.

Șibot is crossed by the national road DN7 (part of European route E68) and by the A1 motorway, which link Bucharest with the Banat and Crișana regions in western Romania. The Șibot train station serves the CFR Main Line 200, which connects Brașov to Timișoara, Arad, and the Hungarian border.

== Natives ==
Historical population
Year	Pop.	±%
2002	2,480	—
2011	2,236	−9.8%
2021	2,100	−6.1%
Source: Census data

- Iosif Sîrbu (1925–1964), sport shooter and Romania's first ever Olympic champion.
