= Stephen V Báthory =

Hungarian politician and general

The Báthory coat-of-arms

Stephen Báthory of Ecsed (Hungarian: Báthory István, pronounced [ˈbaːtori ˈiʃtvaːn]; Romanian: Ștefan Báthory; 1430–1493) was a Hungarian commander, 'dapiferorum regalium magister' (1458–?), judge royal (1471–1493), and voivode of Transylvania (1479–1493). He rose to power under King Matthias Corvinus of Hungary and after the king's death sided with Vladislav Jagiellon of Bohemia and later together with Pál Kinizsi defeated Prince John Corvin in the Battle of Csonthegy (1493). As a result of his cruelty in Transylvania, especially against the Székelys, he was deposed by the King in 1493 and died shortly afterwards.

== Family history ==
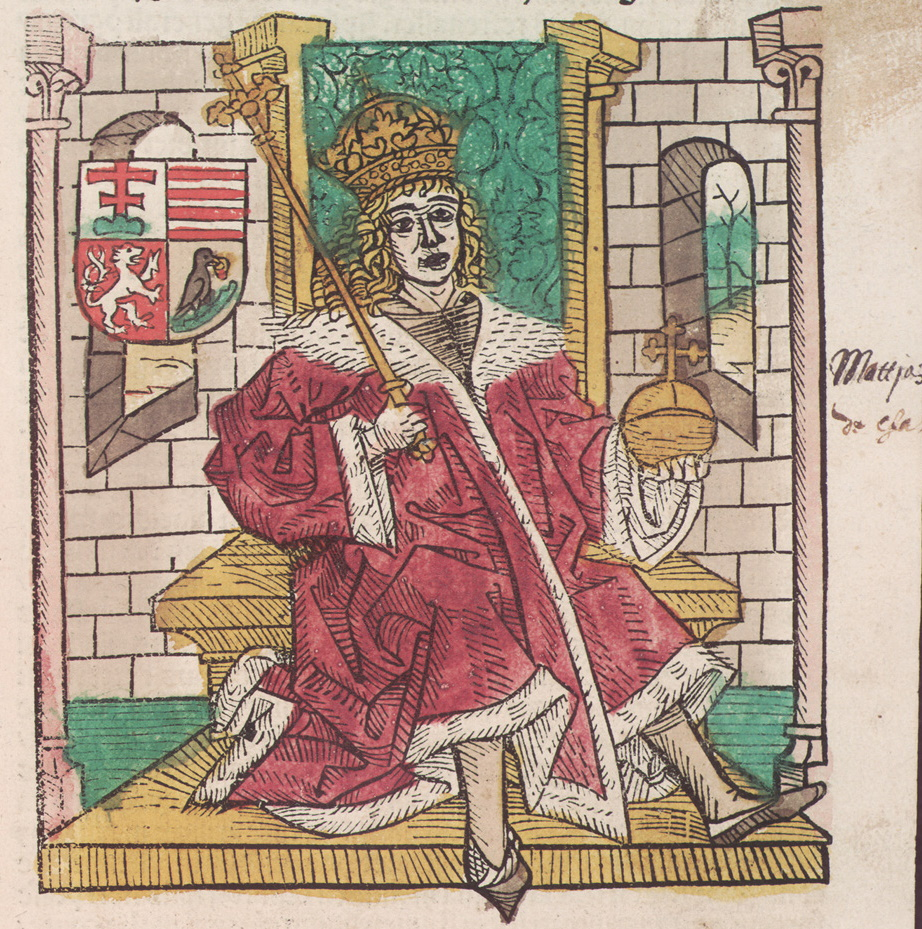
Matthias Corvinus as depicted in Chronica Hungarorum by Johannes de Thurocz

The Báthory family was a powerful and influential Hungarian noble family from the 14th to 17th century. The two branches of the family produced many voivodes, Transylvanian princes and a king, (Stephen Báthory of Poland). Báthory belonged to the powerful family of Gutkeled, of the Ecsed branch. The name Báthory and the family coat-of-arms were granted in 1325.

== Career ==
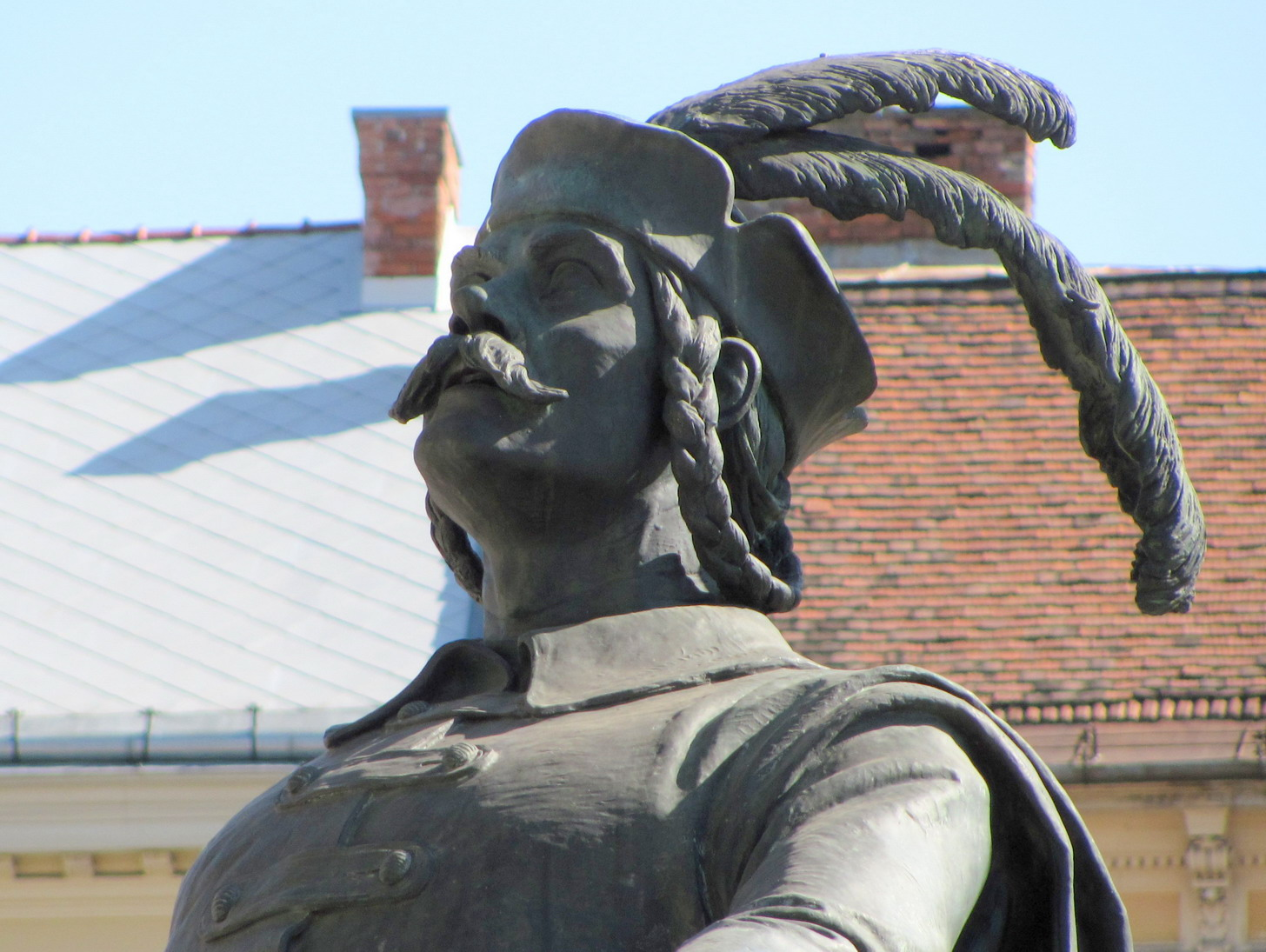
Stephen Báthory on the Matthias Corvinus Monument

In 1467, he took part in Matthias' bitter defeat against Moldavia at the Battle of Baia. In 1476, Corvinus decided to support Vlad III Dracula in reclaiming his Wallachian throne from Basarab Laiotă. He therefore made Báthory supreme commander over an army of 8,000 infantry and 13,000 cavalry, but since Báthory was rather inexperienced in military leadership, "the actual leadership was shared by Dracula and the Serbian despot Vuk Brancovic. Before this, Dracula and Báthory had waged war in Bosnia, where Báthory was sent by Corvinus to free a certain Bosnian king whose name was also Matthias. The new campaign would involve Hungarian, Moldavian, and Wallachian troops, with the assistance of a small Serbian contingent. Dracula wrote to his cousin, Prince Stephen III of Moldavia, to wait for him so that the two could merge their armies, but the merging failed due to delayment in movement of the Hungarian troops, which resulted in Stephen's defeat at the Battle of Valea Albă on 26 July 1476. On 18 August, the two armies merged and helped Stephen get rid of the Turks in Moldavia. After a consultation that took place in the city of Brassó, Dracula, Báthory, and Brancovic invaded Wallachia from southern Transylvania with an army of 35,000, whereas Stephen would aid them by attacking eastern Wallachia with 15,000 men. Dracula's offensive began in early November 1476 and defeated Laiotă's 18,000 strong army at Rucăr, at the Wallachian-Transylvanian border. Both armies lost around 10,000 men. On 8 November, Dracula captured the capital of Târgoviște where he met with Stephen. The two swore eternal allegiance to one another and when at the presence of Báthory, the two pledged as well to pursue a great crusade against the Turks. By 11 November, Báthory reported to the town officials of Nagyszeben that most of Wallachia was in Dracula's hands and added that "all the boyars aside from two are with us" and "even the latter will soon join us." On 16 November, Bucharest fell to Báthory's army and on 26 November, Dracula was reestablished as Prince of Wallachia for his third time. After Stephen and Báthory retreated from Wallachia, Laiotă would return to Wallachia with an army to reclaim his throne. In December, Laiota and Dracula met each other in battle. Dracula possessed only a small army and was killed in battle.

== Battle of Bread Field ==
In 1479, Báthory was made governor of Transylvania and in late August 1479, an Ottoman expedition from Bosnia, commanded by twelve pashas, invaded Transylvania with a force of 43,000 men. The Turks moved very quickly through the land while pillaging it, giving Báthory little time to gather his militia at Sibiu. Pál Kinizsi, the Ban of Timișoara, promised to aid Báthory. As Báthory approached Sebeș, Ali Bey, one of the Turkish pashas, had raised camp on a plain between Mureș and Sebeș, unaware that Kinizsi was also on his way against him.

On the early morning of 13 October, Báthory appeared on the "heights beyond the brook." Ali was forced to stand ground in order to secure an eventual withdrawal and evacuate his booty." Báthory ordered his army to prepare for battle: his 3,000 Transylvanian Saxons, supported by a second line of Transylvanian Wallachians, comprised the right flank on the river Mureș, while the Hungarians comprised the left flank; he and his heavy cavalry were placed in the middle. The Ottoman leaders were in disagreement and had their preparations for the battle delayed; after "three hours of idle waiting, Báthory, confident that Pál Kinizsi would arrive any minute, gave the order to attack." The Transylvanian Saxons opened the attack, but were routed; the Transylvanian Wallachians experienced the same fate, with many being wounded or killed; later, the Hungarian line would be pressured to retreat to the centre. Báthory then charged with his heavy cavalry, but fell off his horse; this alarmed his companions, who interpreted it as a bad omen and advised him to either turn back or retreat to the mountains. He ignored their advice and, as head of his cavalry, charged the first Ottoman line with great force, routing them. Ali then charged with his cavalry and a fierce battle took place that lasted for three hours. Báthory was seriously injured, bleeding from six wounds; "his horse had been killed under him." Surrounded by a "wall of corpses" and barely holding onto his life, he was about to lose the battle when Kinizsi's army appeared on the hill, announcing their presence with drums and trumpets. Some 900 Serbs under a Demeter Jakšić, assisted by "numerous courtiers of the king", charged against the Turks. The Turks, who were taken by surprise, were slaughtered by the furious Kinizsi; after a renewed attack, he managed to save Báthory.

The few Turks who survived the massacre fled into the mountains, where the majority were killed by the local population. Ali, who spoke Romanian put on some peasant clothes and fled to Wallachia. Some 30,000 Turks died in the battle, whereas Báthory lost 8,000 Hungarians and some 2,000 Transylvanian Saxons and Transylvanian Wallachians. The two commanders feasted together with their troops, with Kinizsi dancing with a dead Turk as his companion.

== Aftermath ==
Báthory was accused of using excessive cruelty against the Székely in Transylvania and was deposed by Vladislaus II in 1493. He died shortly afterwards. His family would return to rule as Voivodes and then Princes of Transylvania.
