= Varga Katalin Gymnasium =

- Varga Katalin Gimnázium

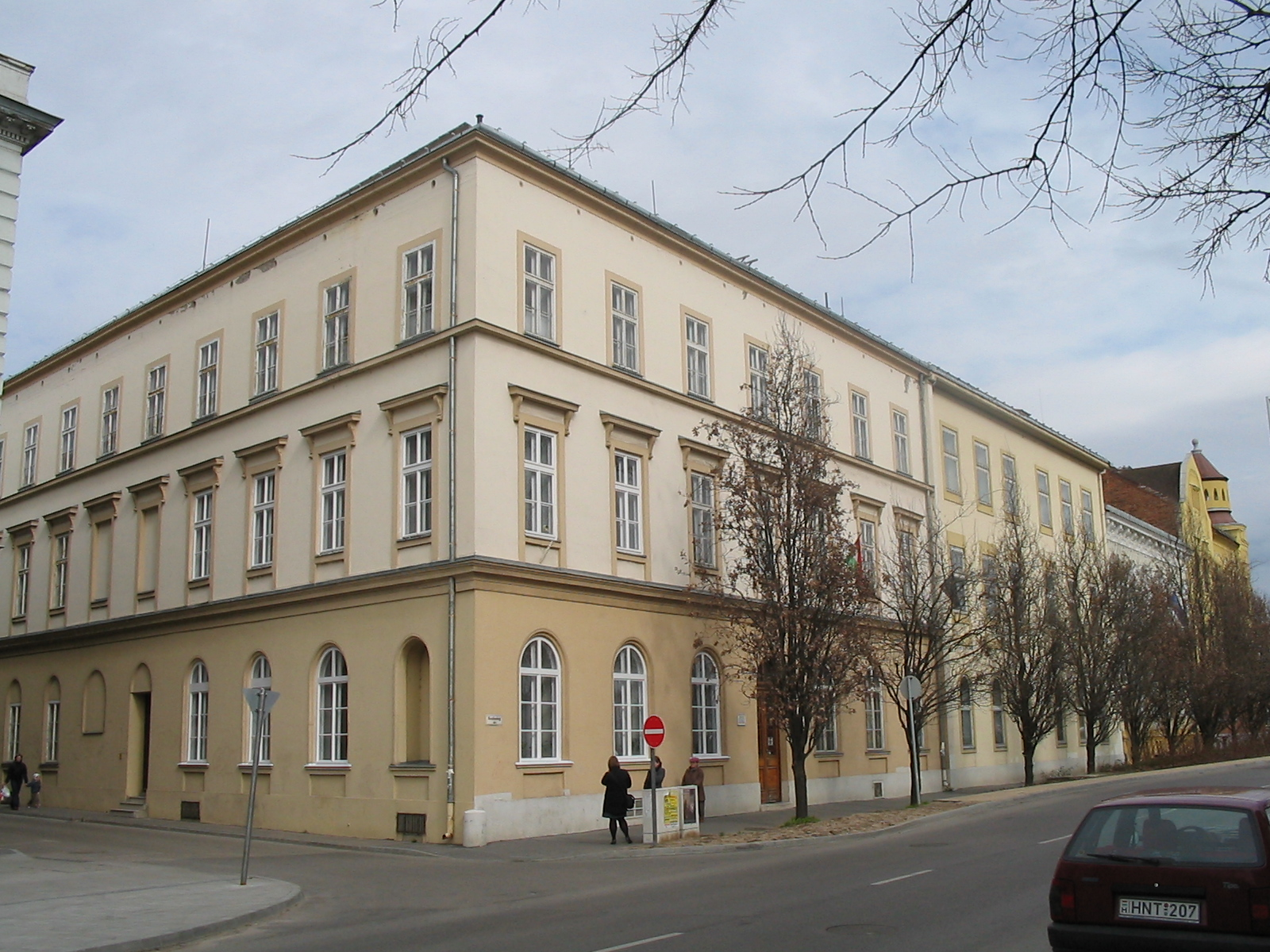

Location
- 6 Szabadság tér Szolnok, H-5001; Hungary; 47°10′27″N 20°12′3″E

Information
- School type: Gymnasium
- Established: 1930
- Headmaster: Mónika Kedves
- Age: 14 to 19
- Enrollment: 521 (2008/09)
- Language: Hungarian, English
- Publication: Vargánya (literary journal)
- Endowment: Bánffy Katalin – Varga Katalin Endowment
- Website: vargaszolnok.hu (in Hungarian)

The Varga Katalin Gymnasium (Hungarian: Varga Katalin Gimnázium) is a secondary school in Szolnok, Hungary established in 1930, which was named after Katalin Bánffy between 1936 and 1951. It is located in the former Obermayer-Hubay apartment house, which is one of the oldest buildings in the town. Its address is Szabadság tér 6, near the confluence of the Tisza and Zagyva rivers.

The school is home to four basic courses of study, outlined in detail below, including one of the country's oldest Hungarian-English bilingual programs (wherein math, physics, biology and history are taught in English). In addition, it was one of the founding schools of the Arany János Program for Talented Youth. At the end of the 1970s the school was the sole location in Hungary of UNESCO research. The rate of acceptance to higher education is consistently above 85%. The school is also well known for its international relations, international programs, and innovative educational policy.

== History ==
On 4 July 1930, the Hungarian Ministry of Religion and Public Education decided to found the Royal Hungarian School for Girls of Szolnok; on 7 July the establishment of the school was authorized by Minister of Culture Count Kunó von Klebelsberg. The first headmaster of the school was Géza Wollek, who was also headmaster of Szolnok's Verseghy Ferenc Gymnasium at the time; the school's first teacher was Dr. Ilona Vatter. The school was the second school for higher education of girls in Jasz-Nagykun-Szolnok County. The school's foundation had been urged by the city's main doctor, Dr. István Elek, in the name of women's rights. He helped additionally with the donation of 250 pengős. The educational institution form lyceum was chosen instead of gymnasium because the founders thought that the Latin language was unnecessary and difficult for the girls.

Teaching began 1 September 1930, in the building which today houses Szolnok's Belvárosi Primary School, thanks to the assistance of Headmistress Elvira Ellmann. The present school building was first used in 1932, the same year in which the school was moved from the Outer Budapest school district to the Debrecen school district. On 1 February 1935, Dr. György Kurucz became headmaster of the school, effectively establishing its autonomy. By popular request, Latin was again taught, which elevated the school to the status of gymnasium, however, the subject of how the girls' education should proceed remained a topic for the local media for years. Instruction in Latin continued to be offered until 2008. In 1936 the school was named for Katalin Bánffy (Hung: Bánffy Katalin) with the official name Royal Hungarian Bánffy Katalin Gymnasium for Girls. The first Matura school-leaving exams were held in 1938. During the Second World War the school building was damaged, but classes were held in Verseghy Ferenc Gymnasium.

In 1951 the school was renamed, this time after Transylvanian noblewoman Katalin Varga, with the name Varga Katalin General Gymnasium for Girls. The original name was retained, however, in the name of the school's endowment (Bánffy Katalin – Varga Katalin Endowment). In 1957 Szolnok's first Young Communist League was founded here. Due to a growing student body, first two classes and later four were required to attend classes in the afternoon; in 1962 a number of teachers and students were split from Varga and founded Szolnok's Tiszaparti Secondary School. Around this time the school also became coeducational, and hence received its current name, Varga Katalin Gymnasium.

There are three secondary schools in Szolnok, like the three daughters of fairy tales. Two are beautiful and ornate, and the third - Cinderella. We are Cinderella, and we have to accept this fact, gloomy as it may be. But don't forget, that with her hard work, with her kindness, and with her modesty, even Cinderella earned her prince.

— Headmistress Mrs. Dr. László Bartha, speaking at September 1962's school-opening ceremony

In 1970 the structure of the faculty began to be developed, and by September 1971 it was operating at such a high level that it began a standard throughout Hungary. In the 1977–1978 school year, on the recommendation of the Hungarian Academy of Sciences' Pedagogic Research Section, Varga was chosen by UNESCO's Institute for Education as the location of ongoing educational research under the leadership of Dr. Ottó Mihály and Dr. József Bernáth. The research was focused on the concept of lifelong learning, which is one of the key educational principles of the European Union. At the same time, between 1971 and 1981, Varga was also used as a testing ground for the early Matura exams. Subjects such as orientation, family studies and others were taught experimentally. One of the more successful projects was the so-called studium generale subject, which included library studies, learning methodology, psychology (self-awareness, creativity), logic, rhetoric, and debate.

During the 1970s Varga upheld its outstanding literary traditions by hosting a number of great Hungarian writers, poets, and critics: József Darvas, Mihály Czine, Sándor Koczkás, Imre Bata, István Simon, László Nagy, Anna Jókai, Sándor Csoóri, Ferenc Sánta, Katalin Berek, Adrienne Jancsó, Lajos Cs. Németh, Ferenc Kállai, János Kass, Gyula László and Júlia Marosi.

I believe that the 1970s definitely established the school's position in Hungary, maybe even in Europe.

— Headmaster László Molnár

In 1988 the Hungarian-English Bilingual Education program was introduced (as a four-year course of study, as opposed to five-year programs in other Hungarian schools), and in 2000 the Arany János Program for Talented Youth was initiated by the Hungarian Ministry of Education. Because of the introduction of the bilingual program, the school's name also became bilingual in 2007. The school was the seat of the national Model European Parliament in 2004, and the regional seat in 2009. Also in 2009 Varga hosted students from around Europe as part of the Comenius Physics Program.

=== Building ===
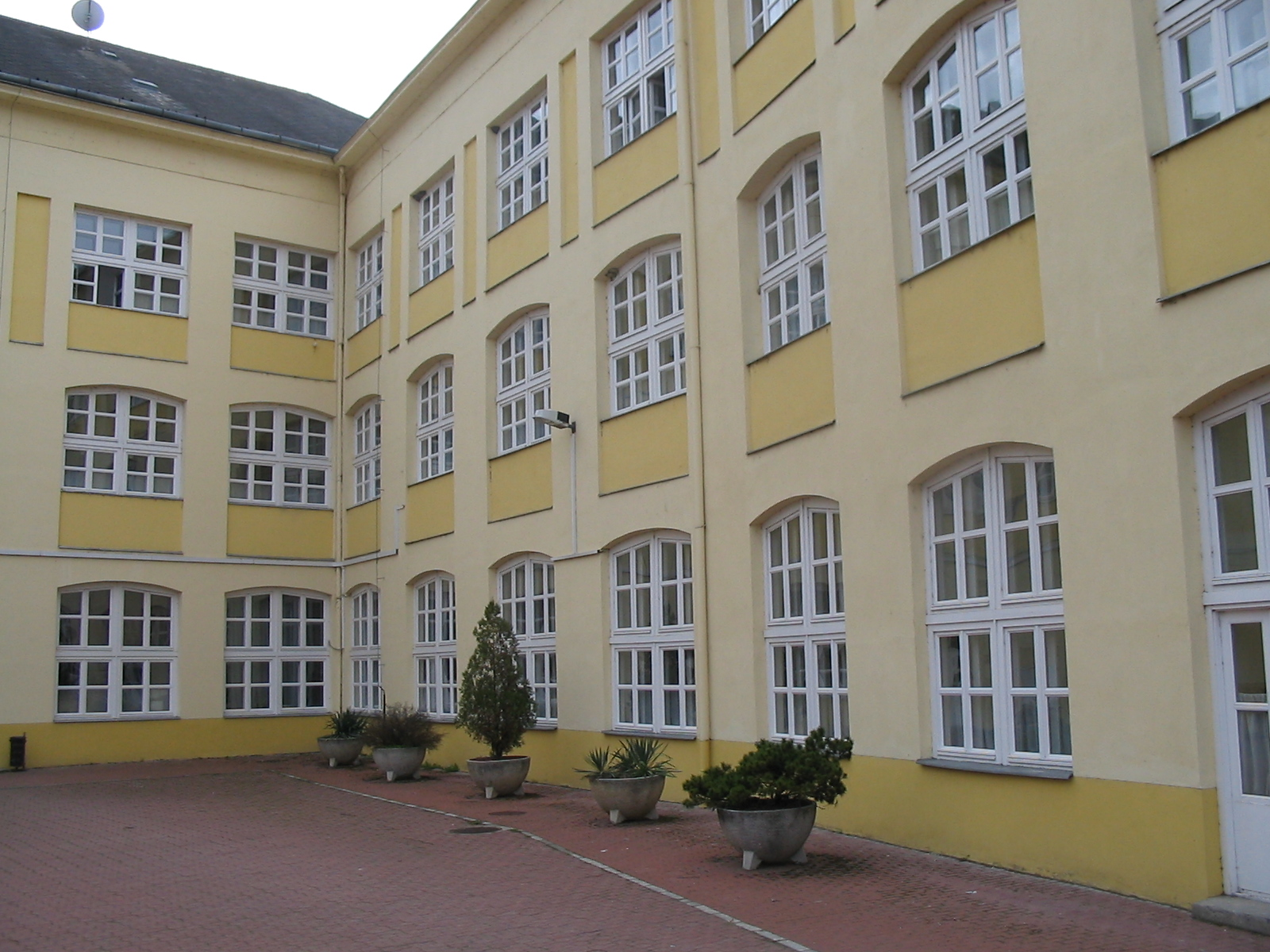
The building's old wing in the 2000s, from the interior courtyard

The neoclassical building which now houses the Varga was originally constructed in 1856. According to the database of the Cultural Heritage Office, the building's original function was as the Obermayer-Hubay block of flats, built by master carpenter Lajos Obermeyer and bought by Ferenc Hubay in 1860. Since 1881 the property has served the city of Szolnok, first as a court of law, from 1891 as a post office, and from 1932 as the location of the school.

The L-shaped three-storied building was situated on a corner, enclosing the area inside it; it had a basement, pitched roof, and glass-covered arches facing the inner courtyard. Since then, an attic was also added, and the "new wing" was added, changing the building from L-shaped to the shape of a lop-sided U. The building is slightly raised from street level. The windows on the ground floor are arched, on the upper floors straight capped with lintels. The ceilings in the ground floor are vaulted; in the upper floors flat. The stairwell inside the "old wing" contains a cast iron handrail. When the school took possession of the building, the stairwell was enlarged, but under careful supervision in respect to the building's status as a protected historical monument.

In 1932 when the institution first moved into the building, it was intended to be a temporary home. The convention at the time of founding stipulated that "Szolnok shall receive a girls' gymnasium only if the city provides a suitable building and equipment." This "suitable building" was never found, so since 1932 the school has not moved. The building's inadequate number of appropriate classrooms and equipment has continued even today to be a frequently discussed point between the school and the city.

Initially only part of the building was given to the school; in other parts there remained tenants, a separate music school, kindergarten, and a wind band. On 1 August 1935, the entirety of the building was given over to the gymnasium. Year by year, the building was improved. During the 1937–198 school year the school received a gym, which was expanded to include dressing rooms and work-out rooms. When the gym was built at the back of the school's property, it abutted another outlying building belonging to the school. This small house, formerly used as teachers' quarters, and now home to the P.E. offices and a classroom, is also under historical preservation due to it being the birthplace of Dr. Kálmán Balogh, a famous Hungarian pharmaceutical scientist. The roof of the gym was renovated in 2008.

In 1940 the structural beams of the building were renovated, but even so two evacuations were necessary before 1962. During the Second World War the building was heavily damaged; years later a live bomb was found among the beams.

The "new wing" was built in 1989, at which time the school gained new classrooms, a cafeteria, a lobby, and a student lounge, and the internal courtyard was also widened. This new wing replaced what had formerly been a chemist's and a block of flats.

=== Library ===
The school's library stood at 2221 volumes in 1944, all of which were destroyed during World War II. After the war, the library again increased by the donations of the students; by 1959 2278 volumes had been collected. The library became fully functioning when the structure of faculty came into use in 1972. Since then a Reading Room was also added, and in 1980 the number of volumes stood at 12,197. Nowadays library studies are taught in the school and a Library Club operates in the school.

=== Headmasters ===
The school's headmasters and headmistresses:

| | Headmasters | Years |
|---|---|---|
| 1. | Géza Wollek (Note: In 1930 the Ministry of Religion and Public Education entrusted the leadership of the school to the headmaster of the city's Gymnasium for Boys. Only five years later did the school begin operating independently.) | 1930–1935 |
| 2. | Dr. György Kurucz | 1935–1941 |
| 3. | János Andor | 1941–1944 |
| 4. | István Valent | 1944–1945 |
| 5. | Ágoston Nevelős | 1946–1947 |
| 6. | Lajos Balogh | 1947–1948 |
| 7. | Ilona Mohácsi | 1948–1949 |
| 8. | Ilma Miklósi, Mrs. János Szalay | 1949–1957 |
| 9. | Éva Szívós, Mrs. András Cseh | 1957–1962 |
| 10. | Dr. Gizella Lakatos, Mrs. Dr. László Bartha | 1962–1969 |
| 11. | Dr. János Páldi | 1969–1985 |
| 12. | Julianna Lukács, Mrs. Lajos Botka | 1985–2002 (Note: Mrs. Botka also served as Mayor of Szolnok from 2002 to 2006.) |
| 13. | László Molnár | 2002–2003 (as deputy); 2003–2025 |
| 14. | Mónika Kedves | 2025- |

== Courses of study ==
=== Earlier ===
The school has always offered instruction at a gymnasium level, but the precise courses of study have varied. When the grades were first divided, one class followed a science-based curriculum, the other a humanities-based curriculum. In 1957 when a third class was added it was also science-focused. In 1959 a fourth technical course of study was added. A German-Russian language curriculum was introduced in 1966. From 1970, after the restructuring of the faculty system, the classes were assigned distinguishing letters based on their chosen course of study.

==== Technical course ====
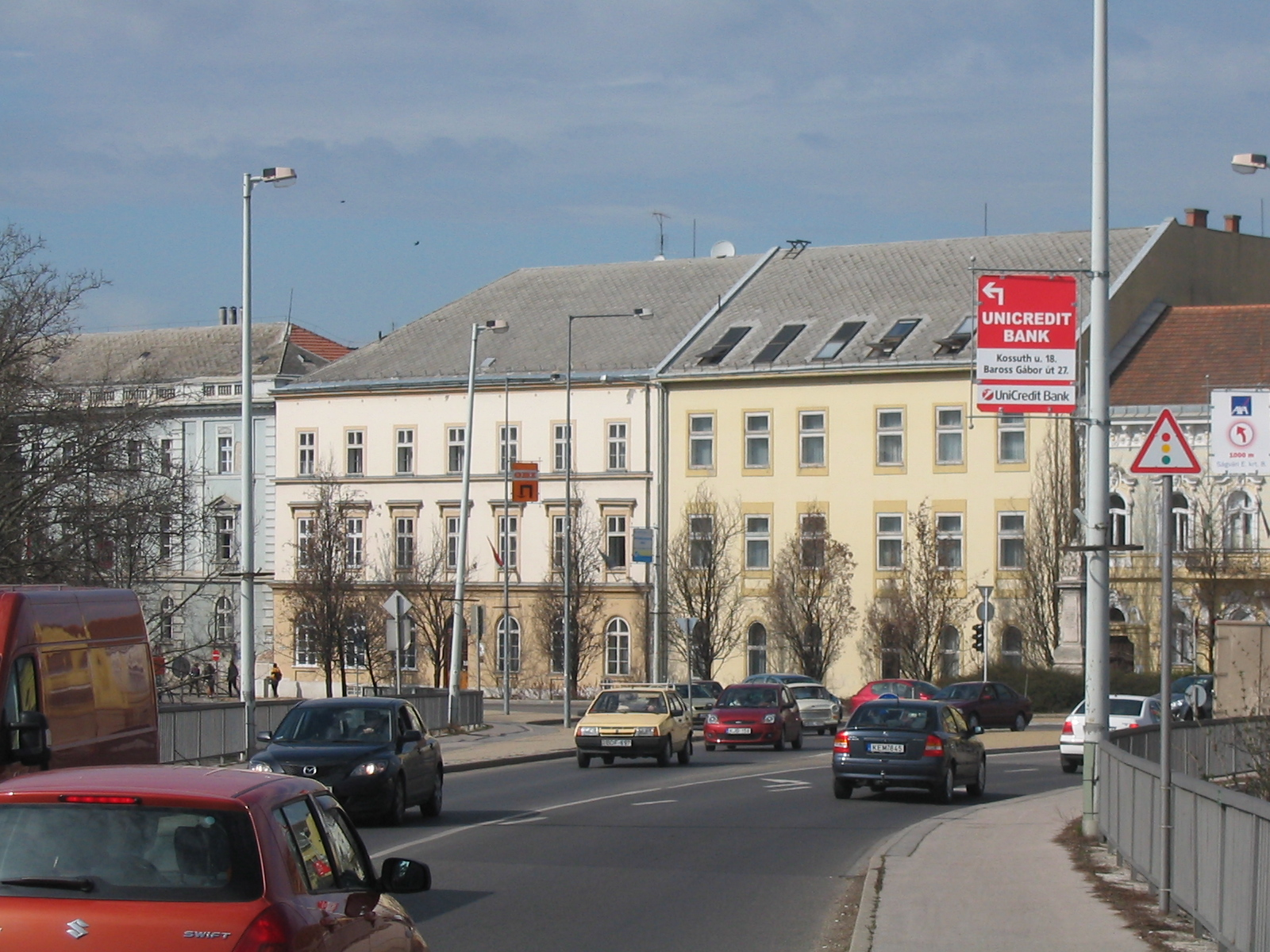
The school, at left, as seen from the Tisza bridge

| Distinguishing letter | D |
| Length of study | 4 years |

Of the programs of study which existed before the 1980s, the most is known about this one. The technical course was initiated in the 1959–1960 school year, the same year when the school began its tradition of having 4 courses of study. The idea was to provide students the opportunity to find their way in a world experiencing rapid technological growth, as well as giving them a practical and theoretical insight into economic life. They were also exposed to agriculture; for them the typical six-day school week was shortened to five days, and the remaining day was spent on-site at Szolnok's Horticultural Company. After four years, the students received a diploma along with their school leaving certificate.

==== Math-German program ====
| Distinguishing letter | D |
| Length of study | 4 years |

In the ninth and tenth grades both German and Math were taught at an advanced level; in the 11th grade the students decided for themselves individually in which direction they would like to continue their advanced studies. In the tenth grade the students were encouraged to take part in a student exchange with students from Reutlingen, Germany. The number of applicants to this program steadily declined; half of the class which began in 2007 chose English as their main language over German. It was the final class of this program.

=== Current programs ===
Currently there are four classes in every year:

==== Arany János Program for Talented Youth ====
| Distinguishing letter | A |
| Length of study | 5 years |

The Arany János Program for Talented Youth (Hung: Arany János Tehetséggondozó Program, AJTP) has been operating in Varga since 2000, when the Hungarian Ministry of Education selected twenty schools to begin the five-year program. The program focuses on educating talented applicants who are disadvantaged in some way, usually socially. In preparation for the first year of the program, all students are required to live in the student hostel. At least once a month the entire class remains together for a weekend program, frequently traveling to various places within Hungary. Class trips are taken in the second year of study to Transylvania, and in the fourth year to England where the students participate in a week-long EFL course. The program also assists the students in obtaining an ECDL, drivers' license, and middle level English exam.

==== Math-English program ====
| Distinguishing letter | B |
| Length of study | 4 years |

In the ninth and tenth grades both English and Math are taught at an advanced level; in the 11th grade the students decide for themselves individually in which direction they would like to continue their advanced studies. Because this program is the most general, it's likely to be replaced in the future with a more specialized program. One possibility would be a course focused on financial education under the direction of the Hungarian National Bank.

==== Hungarian-English Bilingual program ====
| Distinguishing letter | C |
| Length of study | 4 years |

The program, which began in 1988, celebrated its 20th anniversary during the 2008–2009 school year. The aim of this class the acquisition of English at a very high level, and to this end math, physics, biology, and history are taught in English. Unlike many bilingual secondary schools in Hungary, in Varga there is no preparatory year - the students apply as eighth graders, including an oral English exam, and are accepted for the following year based on their own knowledge. During tenth grade, participants in the bilingual course spend two weeks in England doing an intensive EFL course. In addition to the English language at an advanced level, the students in the bilingual program are also much more exposed to English culture, both directly via a British and American Civilization (and civilization of English-speaking countries in general) class in 11th and 12th grades, and indirectly via ongoing classes with native-speaker teachers. At the end of the four-year course the students take their Matura school-leaving exams in Advanced English, which corresponds with a Hungarian state-level exam of the highest level. They must also take exams in English in two other subjects of their choice.

==== General knowledge / module program ====
| Distinguishing letter | D |
| Length of study | 4 years |

Beginning with the new D class of September 2008, the Math-German program was replaced with the 4-module General Knowledge Program. The optional modules are as follows:

- technological module (focusing on math and physics)
- science module (biology and chemistry)
- artistic and practical communication (humanities)
- international knowledge

Each student in the D class chooses one of the above modules to study for a semester; at the end of each semester they must decide to continue with that module or to select a new one. After four semesters, at the end of the tenth grade, the students decide in which direction to focus their studies toward the advanced-level Matura school-leaving exam.

As part of the communications module the students will visit local TV and radio stations, newspaper offices, and the Youth House.

== Achievements ==
- Students of Varga regularly achieve high results in a number of national competitions, notably the OKTV.
- In a 2004 study by Hungary's Educational Research and Development Institute, Varga was ranked ninth in the country according to average entrance exams results, 15th in the country in general, and first in both categories within Jász-Nagykun-Szolnok County.
- In 1998 the school received the "For Jász-Nagykun-Szolnok County Award."
- The school participates annually in Szolnok's 24-hour Competition (a competition between the high schools of the city); in 2007 the school achieved second place and in 2008 first place.
- Varga was awarded the "Pro Universitate" plaque by the Faculty of Science at Kossuth Lajos University (today University of Debrecen); they in turn were given Varga's "Pro Schola" plaque.
- Members of the school are regularly called upon to organize or assist with international programs; in 2008 students were invited as interpreters to EU-HUROMEX Firefighters' International Meeting.

== Partner schools ==
=== Domestic connections ===
Varga is connected with both University of Szeged and Semmelweis University in Budapest. It is also a reference school for the National Textbook Publications (Hung: Nemzeti Tankönyvkiadó). Under the direction of the Program for Quality Management Varga has also been partnered with the following companies and institutions: Office for Arany János Program, the primary schools of Szolnok which act as feeder schools for Varga, Jász-Nagykun-Szolnok County's European Information Point (Europe Direct), British Council, Association of Schools for Self-Development (Önfejlesztő Iskolák Egyesülete), Bilingual Schools Association (Két Tanítási Nyelvű Iskolák Egyesülete), County Pedagogical Institute (Megyei Pedagógiai Intézet), Center for Human Services (Humán Szolgáltató Központ), Educational Consulting Office of Szolnok (Városi Nevelési Tanácsadó), Contact, SI-CO Ltd., Tisza Park Ltd.

=== International connections since 1997 ===
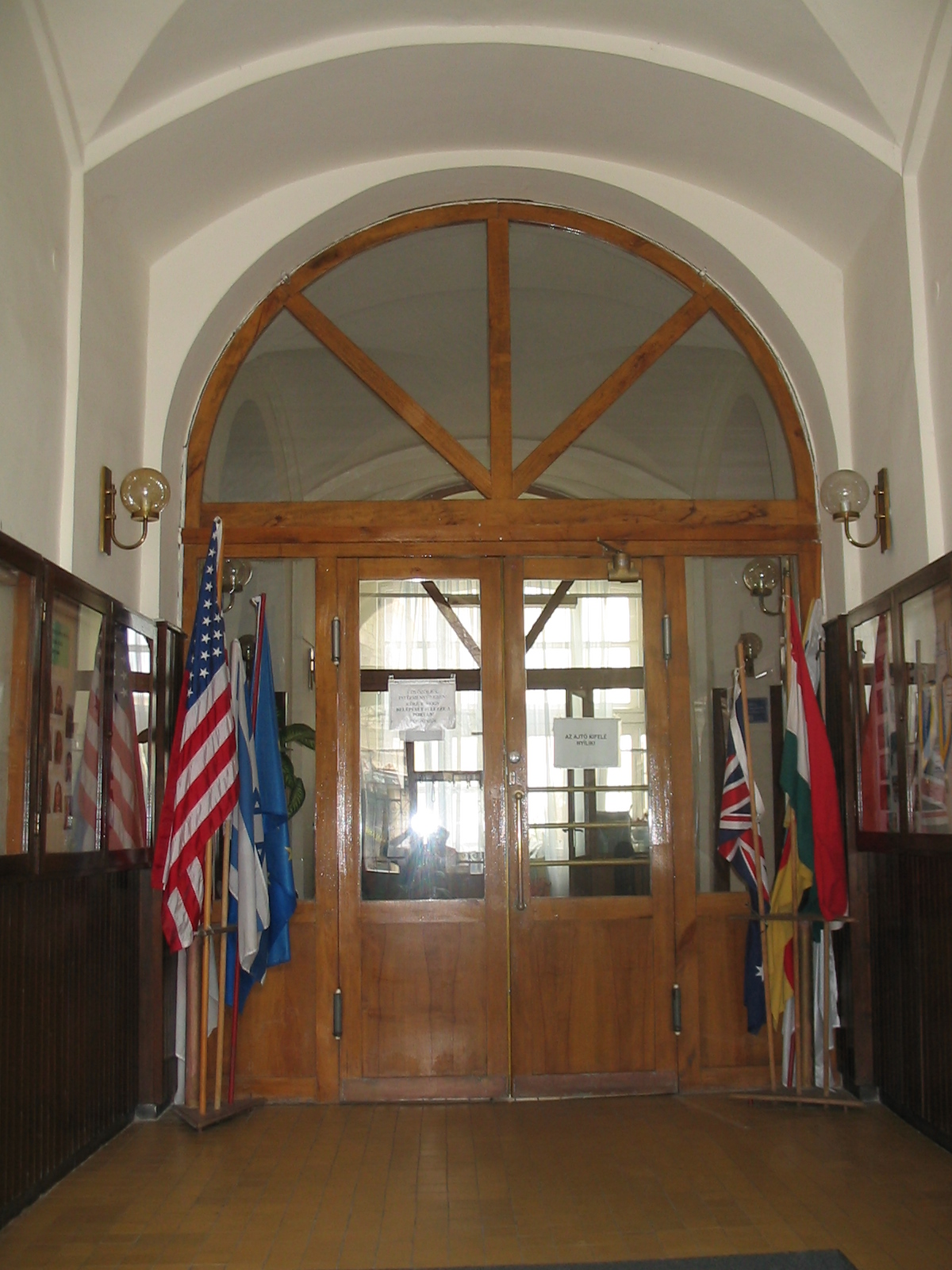
The school's entryway

List of schools with which Varga has had continuing exchanges:

| School name (original language) | Location |
|---|---|
| Albert Einstein Secondary School (Albert-Einstein-Gimnazium) | Reutlingen, Germany |
| Vaskivuori Upper Secondary School (Vaskivuoren lukio) | Vantaa, Finland |
| Vámbéry Ármin Secondary School (former name: Hungarian Language Secondary School) | Dunaszerdahely, Slovakia |
| Atlantic College | Llantwit Major, Wales |
| Concordia University | Mequon, Wisconsin, United States |
| Kent School of English | Broadstairs, England |
| Gould Academy | Bethel, Maine, United States |
| Kilwinning Academy | Kilwinning, Scotland |
| Immaculata Instituut | Bruges–Sint-Michiels, Belgium |
| Växjö Katedralskola | Växjö, Sweden |
| Shoham High School (תיכון שוהם) | Shoham, Israel |
| Kopernik Liceum (I Liceum Ogólnokształcącego im. M. Kopernika w Bielsku-Białej) | Bielsko-Biała, Poland |
| Niftarlake College | Utrecht–Maarssen, Netherlands |
| European School of Brussels I (Ecole Européenne de Bruxelles I Uccle) | Brussels, Belgium |

Exchange programs can be made by a class or by a separate group of students. In the latter case, preference is given to students whose interests are best suited for the exchange, but the program is still open for all applicants. Varga also has a connection with the European Parliament in Strasbourg via the Euroscola program. Exchanges are also facilitated through various sister cities of Szolnok, for example Yuza in Japan. Participating in an international program organised by three counties in Europe Varga also got connections in Somme, France and Durham, England.

== Student life ==
Another feature of Varga is its student life.

From the 1930s until the 1960s there was a mandatory school uniform. This consisted of "dark blue sailor suit with white collar and cuffs, white blouse with blue collar and cuffs, as regulated. Uniform cap, blue for winter and white for summer, and white cotton gloves." Later added to this were "white blue-striped smock for everyday use, and a dark blue coat for winter," a spring jacket, and clothing and shoes suitable for exercising in. Nowadays the only uniform required is for the P.E. lessons, and students wear T-shirts with the school logo on them.

=== Traditions ===
Katalin Day The so-called Katalin Day (in recent years, Katalin Week) is possible the most important event in Varga student life. It takes place in November, usually the week surrounding November 25, the feast day of St. Catherine. The week is centered on the ninth grade classes and giving them an opportunity to introduce themselves to the school. The main event of the week is a show created by each of the ninth grade classes and performed for upperclassmen and teachers in Szolnok's Aba Novak Cultural Center or in the local Sport Arena. In addition to the show, each class has opportunities through the week to earn points for themselves (such as themed dress-up days, poster campaign, school quiz, etc.) to determine which class wins the week. 11.B class also presents a 'good bye' show for the senior classes.

October 23 and March 15

In Varga, the traditional celebration of October 23 is for the 11.D class to design the commemorative program (typically, speeches and poetry readings) and for a selected teacher to give the memorial speech. At this time the senior students also receive ribbons showing their school and year of Matura, which they can wear during the school year, as per Hungarian customs. The 15 March program is organized and carried out by the 10.C class. In addition to their program, speeches are also given by selected student and member of faculty. Location for these ceremonies is typically the Aba Novak Cultural Center of Szolnok or the courtyard of the school.

Christmas In December programs are given by two senior classes. The 12.B class is responsible for the program at St. Nicholas' Day. In the week preceding the Christmas break, the 12.C class goes caroling in English through the school.

School Leavers' Ball The School Leavers' Ball in Varga is called the Tabló-bál. It gets its name from the tabló, which is a decorated placard created by each senior class containing pictures of the class and their teachers. The ball usually takes place in November a few weeks after the 23 October ribbon-pinning ceremony. The 11.C class is responsible for decoration of the event, which is normally held in Szolnok's City Sport Arena.

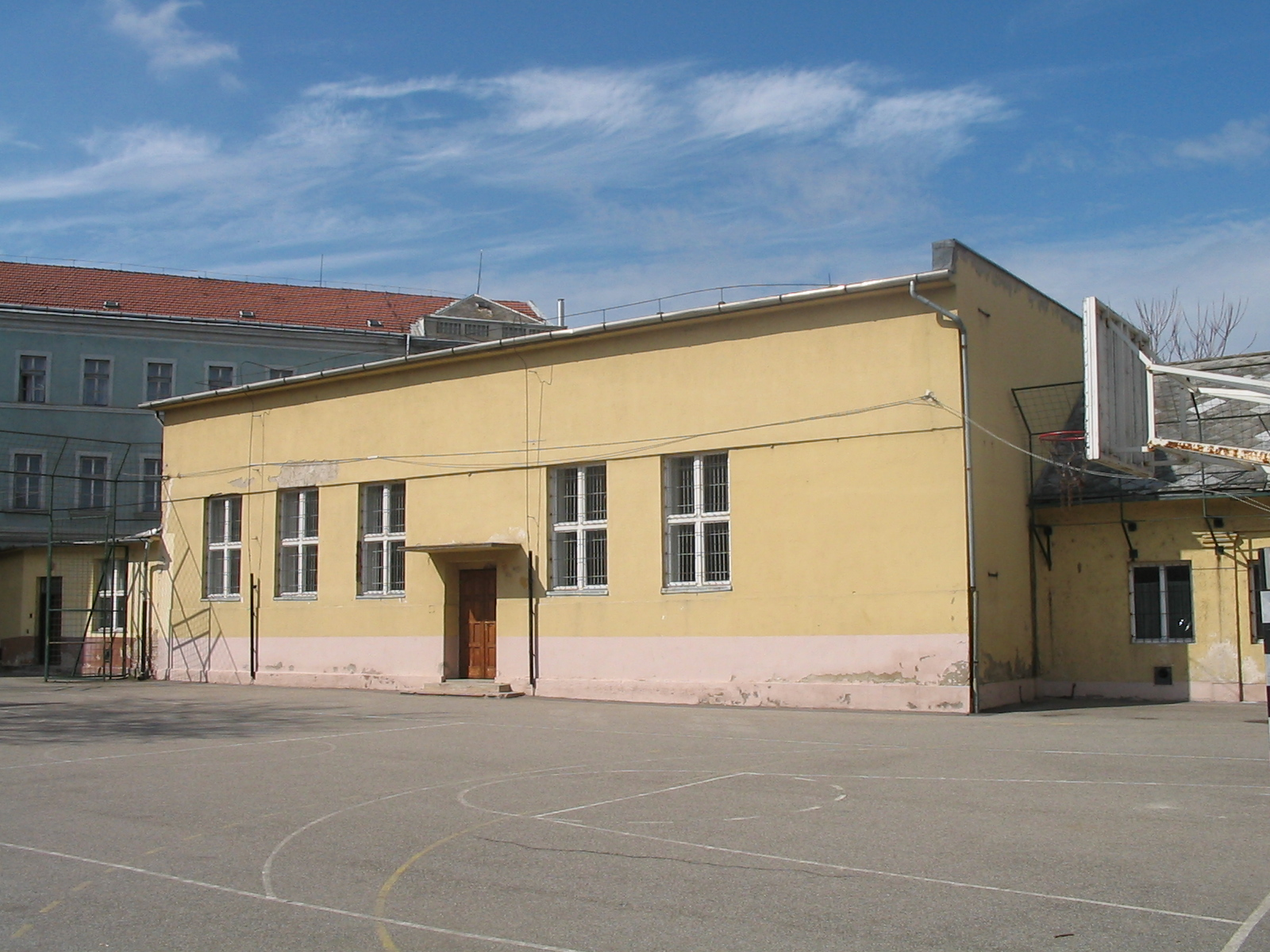
The basketball court and gym

School Gala The so-called School Gala, held annually since 1994, is a talent show for Varga students to show off their entertaining skills to their friends, family, and classmates. Nowadays it is usually held in Szolnok's Aba Novak Cultural Center or Szigligeti Theater. It has launched several Varga students into poetical and theatrical careers.

Sports Day At the end of every school year the P.E. department organizes a Sports Day. As well as taking part in various sports competitions, the classes also compete in a cook-off. This event takes place either at Millér Park or at the sports facilities of the Szolnok Helicopter Base.

Student Symposium Varga regularly organizes symposium days, in which numerous Hungarian and international secondary schools have participated. Some examples are the annual English Language Cultural Symposium and the Natural Sciences Symposium.

=== Student Clubs ===
Almost every subject in Varga Katalin Secondary School has its own related club. To name a few, there is a self-development club, a film club, and an arts club. Students' work can be seen and read in the "Vargánya" school literary magazine (whose editor, teacher István P. Nagy, also was co-editor of Hungarian literary publications "Eső" and "Torkolat"). There was also a library club, which acted as a four-year course preparing its members to take an exam in Librarian Studies. Earlier there were also a photography club and a music club. From the 1950s study rooms have been offered, which both provide the students a chance for extra studies with their teachers in the afternoon, as well as a supervised location. In 1980, as part of the Jubilee celebrations, the Former Students Friend Circle (Öreg Diákok Baráti Köre) was created.

Religious Groups Originally, two religious youth groups were formed by Religions teacher László Szabó in 1932: the Guards of the Sacred Heart (Sziv-Gárda) and the Congregation of Mary (Mária Kongregáció). (Although both groups were Catholic, the institution has always provided Calvinist, Lutheran, and Jewish religious education as well.) The aim of the groups, and of their successors, the Saint Elisabeth Guards of the Sacred Heart and the Congregation of Blessed Margaret (a Szent Erzsébet szívgárda és a Boldog Margit kongregáció), was to both provide religious education, as well as having members regularly offer support, offerings, and acts of good will. The older students were usually members of the Congregation, while younger students were in the Guard. They met fortnightly. At its peak the organizations together contained more than 150 members.

Sports On 7 October 1933 the school's Sports Club was initiated with a school-wide competition which has been repeated annually ever since. The original club included gymnastics, athletics, rhythmic dance, swimming, and other games. The club gave dance performances year after year in the Szigligeti Theater. In February 1935 they performed a show called "Student Dream" (Diákálom) about a student's first day at the girls' school. The club began functioning even before the gym had been built, so physical education classes were held in a normal classroom. In 1936 the Sports club inaugurated the tennis court in the school's courtyard, and later the basketball court and the winter ice-skating rink.

Girl Scouts In October 1935 a Girl Scout troop was formed in the school, which in the following year received the name "Bánffy Katalin" Troop 130. The troop, whose members numbers about 50, held weekly meetings during which they sang, practiced homemaking skills, made excursions, and had lessons in book-binding and first aid. On 9 January 1937 they held their first performance in Szigligeti Theater. From 1938 they took place in the national Scout Jamboree.

Literary Circle From the 1930s the school has had a literary debate society. Its goal was self-cultivation mainly through various literary works, but also by examining musical works as well, and works from other cultures. The circle was led by painter and art history teacher Sándor Baranyó in the 1960s.

Poetry Club The school also has a successful poetry and spoken work club. In Szolnok's 2009 Megavers competition, Varga student Ágnes Barta received first place. Three members of the club also received the Kazinczy Commemorative Medal: Soma Zámbori, Margit Szarbari, and László Bogár; the latter two also received it as university students. The poetry reading traditions reach back to the original Poetry and Reading Club begun in 1935.

Thespis Teatrum Drama Club The school's current drama club was set up by Zoltán Fodor in 1997, at which time one of the classes performed the musical Hair. The show was a success, earning second place in a local competition and fourth nationally. In the following years, students from all classes took place in the productions. The performances regularly place in the top four in national competitions, which have been held in Kecskemét, Debrecen, Budapest, Gyomaendrőd and Solymár. In 1999 the club, along with other international drama groups, was invited to Durham for the performance of the UNICEF-created children's rights musical "Thursday's Child". In 2002 and subsequent two years through the Arany János Program for Talented Youth the club took place in the National Drama Camp. Also in 2002 they were invited to Växjö. From 2005 they have regularly been invited to perform at Gould Academy in Bethel, Maine USA. Currently the "Student Stage" is led by former student Márton Kovács and his mother Zsuzsa Boross Mrs. Kovács, who is a teacher in the school.

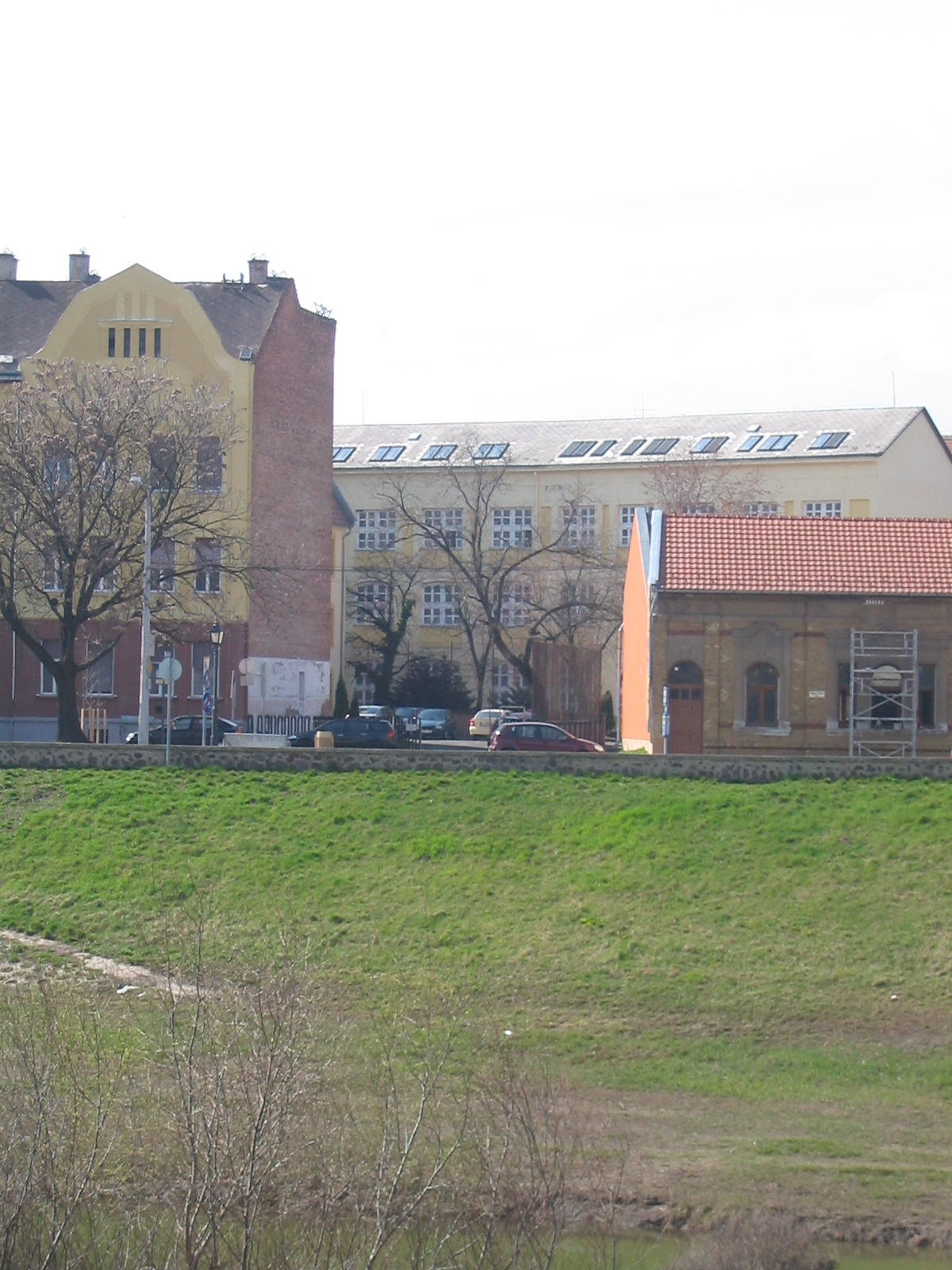
The school as seen from the far bank of the Zagyva

Past performances by year:

- 1998 – Hair
- 1999 – Grease
- 1999 – István Örkény's short stories
- 1999 – Thursday's Child
- 2000 – Gábor Czakó: Disznójáték
- 2001 – Angels’ Court
- 2001 – Károly Szakonyi: Black-out
- 2002 – Melchior Lengyel: Shadow
- 2002 – Petőfi Sándor: A helység kalapácsa
- 2003 – Mihály Csokonai Vitéz: Dorottya
- 2003 – Jerry Bock: Fiddler on the Roof
- 2003 – Murray Schisgal: The Typists
- 2004 – Ede Szigligeti: Liliomfi
- 2004 – Övön alul
- 2004 – Harold Pinter: The Birthday Party
- 2005 – Sławomir Mrożek: Tango
- 2005 – Cats
- 2006 – Monty Python: Eric, the Viking
- 2007 – Canterbury tales
- 2009 – Sławomir Mrożek: Widows

The club has performed several plays for years and made several revivals.

Choirs In the 11th class, students can choose which art subject to participate in (practice singing, art practice, art history, descriptive geometry). Those who choose singing automatically become members of the singing club, but others are also welcome to join. The school also has a men's choir. The choir and the other singing groups perform on a regular basis, among which the Christmas concert is especially prominent. The concert takes place annually in one of the churches of Szolnok. In addition the group has also traveled abroad; about an exchange with Finland one choir member said, "the two schools exchanged not only experiences, but sounds/voices as well."”

Model European Parliament The school has taken part - representing the country of Netherlands - in the program since its beginning in Hungary in 2003. The corresponding student club was set up as a place to prepare for the meetings, most importantly by discussion and debate about current political events. In 2004 the school hosted the second National Session, in 2009 the school received students from many member countries of the European Union.

== Endowments ==
=== First endowments and the Szolnok Society of Friends of the Lyceum ===
The school's first endowment was the 250 pengő offered by Dr. István Elek, the interest of which was always awarded to a student with outstanding performance. Other than this, even before the establishment of the school there was the Society of Friends of the Lyceum (Leányliceum Barátainak Egyesülete), which helped the school financially, assisted the renovation of the school building, and oversaw alumni functions.

=== The Bánffy Katalin – Varga Katalin Endowment ===
This endowment aims to help students' educational progress by supporting and giving funds for language exams, language camps, admission exams preparation, in-field practice, textbooks, debate competitions, and travel abroad. In addition the endowment also provides funds for teachers' professional training.

=== The Vargánya Student Endowment ===
Its primary goal is the encouragement of student life and activities which are not covered by the Bánffy–Varga endowment. It also organizes programs and outings for students, supports student council, and student sports. It also supports the school's ongoing Child- and Youth-Protection programs and provided assistance for socially vulnerable and disadvantaged children. The endowment also finances the publication of the student newspaper, Vargánya, anthologies, and year books.

== The "Pro Schola" award ==
The "Varga Katalin Gimnáziumért" memorial plaque is our school's highest accolade.

— from the school policy handbook

The "Pro Schola" award is given annually to those who spiritually, materialistically, or through physical labor improve the school. The award is a plaque, designed by sculptor and teacher István Nagy, which contains the name of the award in Hungarian: A Varga Katalin Gimnáziumért. It also contains the years of the foundation of the school, 1930, and the foundation of the award, 1980, as well as the name of Szolnok. There are also two pictures on the plaque: relay racers on the left and students sitting around a table on the right.

Recipients of the award as of 2009
1. Mrs. Dr. László Bartha (headmistress (Note: at the time of the award, s/he had already graduated or retired))
2. Dr. Ottó Welker (Ministry head adviser)
3. Ferenc Csányi (Parent Teacher Association president)
4. Dr. Irma Juhász (school doctor)
5. Lajos Porcsalmi (executive county adviser)
6. Dr. József Bernáth (candidate)
7. László Kővári (executive county adviser)
8. István Paál (head director of Szolnok's Szigligeti Theater)
9. Kossuth Lajos Tudományegyetem Faculty of Science
10. Great Hungarian Plains Oil Production Firm (Nagyalföldi Kőolajtermelő Vállalat)
11. Szolnok Radio station (Szolnoki Rádióállomás)
12. Corps 6814 of the Hungarian People's Army
13. János Kardos (manager of MEZŐGÉP)
14. István Dusa (County Planning Board employee)
15. Dr. Ilona Vértes (first teacher)
16. Mrs. Antal Kocsány (teacher)
17. Mária Nagy (teacher)
18. Erzsébet Ölbey (teacher)
19. Ildikó Csábi
20. Dr. Piroska Muzsi (teacher)
21. Dr. Zoltán Kovács (teacher)
22. Mrs. Béla Varga (caretaker)
23. Mrs. László Szabó (teacher)
24. Mrs. Károly Csendes (teacher)
25. Dr. János Páldi (headmaster)
26. Endre Kádas (secretary of the Young Communist League)
27. Gábor Kopiás (student)
28. Katalin Pozsonyi (student)
29. János Györgyey (student)
30. László Szudi (secretary of the Young Communist League)
31. Gizella Árgyelán
32. Dr. József Horváth
33. Margit Pintér (teacher)
34. László Bérczes (teacher)
35. Károly Fazekas
36. Mrs. Lajos Botka (headmistress)
37. Antal Fábián
38. Kálmán Mihály
39. Viktor Rónay (teacher)
40. Dr. Ottó Mihály
41. István Mihályi
42. Miklós Kádár
43. Mrs. Árpád Antóni
44. Mrs. János Czakó
45. Mrs. Ferenc Szép (teacher)
46. Tibor Fekete
47. Gábor Sajti
48. Mrs. Emil Zsidai
49. Mrs. Miklós Petrásovits
50. Erik Szarvas
51. Katalin Csomor
52. Zoltán Bakos
53. Mrs. Elemér Pafféri (teacher)
54. Elemér Pafféri (teacher)
55. Mrs. Kálmán Peták (teacher)
56. Mónika Kedves
57. László Botka (student)
58. Erika Vékony (teacher)
59. Márta Balogh (teacher)
60. István Válé
61. Dr. Katalin Zsuga, Mrs. Várhelyi
62. Mrs. Tibor Horváth (teacher)
63. Márta Imre Mrs. Nagy (teacher)
64. Éva Kálmán
65. Greg Waldrip (guest teacher)
66. Mrs. László Bartha (teacher)
67. Petra Péter
68. Ilona Nagy, Mrs. Dalmadi (teacher)
69. Róza Szabó (teacher)
70. Zsuzsa Gábor Szabó
71. Zoltán Kurucz
72. Henriett Bartha
73. Éva Mészáros (teacher)
74. Miklós Csete
75. Sándor Werovszky
76. Dr. István Szalay
77. Irén Böröcz, Mrs. Szügyi (teacher)
78. Mrs. István Dencső
79. Tisza Klub
80. class 12/A (form teacher: Ilona Szakálos Mrs. Mrená)
81. Zsófia Lázár
82. Dr. Marianna Szlovák Mrs. Juhász (teacher)
83. Mrs. Árpád Bíró (assistant)
84. Éva Magócs (teacher)
85. Géza Herczeg
86. Judit Petraskó
87. Ádám Viplak (student)
88. Zoltán Fodor (teacher)
89. Tamás Krämer
90. Éva Muhari (teacher)
91. László Kiss (deputy headmaster)
92. Zoltán Pafféri
93. Szilvia Lakatos
94. Erika Munkácsi (teacher)
95. Koppány Karsay
96. Csilla Várhelyi
97. Mrs. Sándor Karakas
98. Máté Fodor (student)
99. Márton Kovács (student)
100. Tibor Nagy (teacher)
101. Gábor Ónódi (student)
102. Zoltán Nagy (student)
103. Mrs. József Molnár (parent)
104. István Szűcs (custodian)
105. Mrs. József Mucsi (teacher)
106. István Makai (student)
107. Erzsébet Pásztrai (teacher, librarian)
108. Mrs. Árpád Bíró (Note: her second time receiving the award)
109. Men's chamber choir
110. Mária Büttner Mrs. Molnár (teacher)
111. Ágnes Magyar Mrs. Oláh (school secretary)
112. Irén Antal Mrs. Pintér (school secretary)
113. Máté Bányi (student)

== Enrollment statistics ==
The school began with only 38 students, but by 1938 (the year by which all 8 grades began operating) this had increased to almost three hundred. Until the Second World War the number of students remained between two and three hundred; after it dropped to less than two hundred in most years. From 1945 when four-year education began, the students were divided into multiple classes. At first there were two classes, which in 1957 expanded to three, and in 1959 to four, at which time classes were also being held in afternoon sessions. From this time enrollment expanded steadily; in 1962 it reached 491 students, but in this year the Tiszaparti Secondary School was split out of Varga, so the number was reduced to 240. From this point the number of students again rose steadily and in the 2000s has consistently been above 500 students.

Enrollment numbers from 1930 to 1980 by grade; after 1980 by grade and class

Number of students by grade, under the 8-year system, 1930–1952
| School Year | I. | II. | III. | IV. | V. | VI. | VII. | VIII. | Total |
|---|---|---|---|---|---|---|---|---|---|
| 1930–1931 | 38 | - | - | - | - | - | - | - | 38 |
| 1931–1932 | 27 | 41 | - | - | - | - | - | - | 68 |
| 1932–1933 | 41 | 26 | 46 | - | - | - | - | - | 113 |
| 1933–1934 | 44 | 36 | 30 | 52 | - | - | - | - | 162 |
| 1934–1935 | 39 | 37 | 35 | 29 | 47 | - | - | - | 187 |
| 1935–1936 | 40 | 41 | 36 | 34 | 23 | 44 | - | - | 218 |
| 1936–1937 | 40 | 43 | 44 | 35 | 36 | 24 | 42 | - | 263 |
| 1937–1938 | 54 | 44 | 48 | 45 | 28 | 34 | 31 | 43 | 317 |
| 1938–1939 | 42 | 52 | 41 | 50 | 40 | 23 | 27 | 21 | 296 |
| 1939–1940 | 44 | 36 | 50 | 34 | 29 | 37 | 22 | 27 | 280 |
| 1940–1941 | 41 | 38 | 35 | 44 | 21 | 26 | 31 | 21 | 257 |
| 1941–1942 | 46 | 35 | 35 | 35 | 29 | 17 | 26 | 30 | 253 |
| 1942–1943 | 45 | 49 | 33 | 31 | 36 | 26 | 16 | 24 | 260 |
| 1943–1944 | 42 | 42 | 48 | 36 | 33 | 31 | 24 | 16 | 172 |
| 1944–1945 | 22 | 25 | 16 | 28 | 16 | 15 | 14 | 12 | 148 |
| 1945–1946 (Note: A nyolcosztályos általános iskola szervezése) | - | 38 | 50 | 41 | 44 | 29 | 25 | 25 | 253 |
| 1946–1947 | 1 | 2 | 36 | 35 | 35 | 39 | 23 | 22 | 194 |
| 1947–1948 | - | - | 2 | 40 | 37 | 31 | 35 | 25 | 170 |
| 1948–1949 | - | - | - | - | 46 | 34 | 35 | 28 | 143 |
| 1949–1950 | - | - | - | - | (Note: Because of the educational system change, these number can be seen in the other chart) | 43 | 32 | 33 | 195 |
| 1950–1951 | - | - | - | - | | | 42 | 30 | 213 |
| 1951–1952 | - | - | - | - | | | | 40 | 231 |

Number of students by grade under the 4-year system, 1949–1962
| Year | I. | II. | III. | IV. | Total |
|---|---|---|---|---|---|
| 1949–1950 | 87 | | | | 195 |
| 1950–1951 | 83 | 58 | | | 213 |
| 1951–1952 | 79 | 59 | 53 | | 231 |
| 1952–1953 | 78 | 53 | 46 | 50 | 227 |
| 1953–1954 | 84 | 67 | 49 | 41 | 241 |
| 1954–1955 | 74 | 75 | 57 | 42 | 248 |
| 1955–1956 | 68 | 67 | 70 | 61 | 266 |
| 1956–1957 | 69 | 57 | 56 | 67 | 251 |
| 1957–1958 | 99 | 56 | 55 | 52 | 262 |
| 1958–1959 | 99 | 77 | 44 | 52 | 272 |
| 1959–1960 | 118 | 91 | 72 | 39 | 320 |
| 1960–1961 | 117 | 107 | 83 | 69 | 376 |
| 1961–1962 | 202 | 101 | 115 | 73 | 491 |

Number of students by grade under the 4-year system, 1962–1980
| Year | I. | II. | III. | IV. | Total |
|---|---|---|---|---|---|
| 1962–1963 (Note: In 1962 Tiszaparti Secondary School was split from Varga) | 77 | 65 | 53 | 45 | 240 |
| 1963–1964 | 101 | 74 | 55 | 47 | 277 |
| 1964–1965 | 96 | 86 | 65 | 52 | 299 |
| 1965–1966 | 78 | 75 | 66 | 68 | 287 |
| 1966–1967 | 68 | 61 | 71 | 59 | 259 |
| 1967–1968 | 85 | 62 | 52 | 65 | 264 |
| 1968–1969 | 71 | 76 | 47 | 43 | 237 |
| 1969–1970 | 109 | 67 | 72 | 44 | 292 |
| 1970–1971 | 125 | 95 | 57 | 66 | 343 |
| 1971–1972 | 78 | 110 | 88 | 51 | 327 |
| 1972–1973 | 77 | 75 | 96 | 76 | 324 |
| 1973–1974 | 69 | 75 | 74 | 83 | 301 |
| 1974–1975 | 86 | 68 | 73 | 72 | 299 |
| 1975–1976 | 103 | 84 | 64 | 70 | 321 |
| 1976–1977 | 80 | 105 | 81 | 65 | 331 |
| 1977–1978 | 70 | 77 | 101 | 78 | 326 |
| 1978–1979 | 93 | 67 | 78 | 99 | 337 |
| 1979–1980 | 75 | 93 | 67 | 78 | 313 |

Number of students by grade and class, 1980–present
| Year | I. | | | | | II. | | | | | III. | | | | | IV. | | | | | | | Total |
| Year | A | B | C | D | | A | B | C | D | | A | B | C | D | | A | B | C | D | | | | Total |
|---|---|---|---|---|---|---|---|---|---|---|---|---|---|---|---|---|---|---|---|---|---|---|---|
| 1980–1981 | 38 | 38 | 28 | - | - | 39 | 39 | - | - | - | 37 | 35 | 23 | - | - | 35 | 31 | - | - | - | - | - | 343 |
| 1981–1982 | 38 | 38 | - | - | - | 38 | 28 | 28 | - | - | 38 | 38 | - | - | - | 37 | 35 | 24 | - | - | - | - | 342 |
| 1982–1983 | 38 | 38 | 25 | - | - | 39 | 36 | - | - | - | 37 | 36 | 28 | - | - | 38 | 38 | - | - | - | - | - | 353 |
| 1983–1984 | 37 | 37 | - | - | - | 38 | 38 | 26 | - | - | 39 | 37 | - | - | - | 38 | 35 | 28 | - | - | - | - | 353 |
| 1984–1985 | 37 | 37 | 30 | - | - | 36 | 36 | - | - | - | 38 | 39 | 26 | - | - | 39 | 37 | - | - | - | - | - | 355 |
| 1985–1986 | 38 | 38 | - | - | - | 38 | 35 | 30 | - | - | 36 | 35 | - | - | - | 36 | 37 | 25 | - | - | - | - | 348 |
| 1986–1987 | 23 | 29 | 30 | - | - | 38 | 37 | - | - | - | 37 | 36 | 31 | - | - | 36 | 36 | - | - | - | - | - | 333 |
| 1987–1988 | 31 | 32 | 25 | - | - | 23 | 29 | 32 | - | - | 39 | 39 | - | - | - | 38 | 36 | 30 | - | - | - | - | 354 |
| 1988–1989 (Note: Beginning in the 1988/89 school year, the C class was designated as the bilingual Hungarian-English class.) | 37 | 36 | 23 | - | - | 31 | 33 | 27 | - | - | 24 | 29 | 32 | - | - | 39 | 39 | - | - | - | - | - | 350 |
| 1989–1990 | 31 | 28 | 28 | 27 | - | 36 | 35 | 24 | - | - | 31 | 32 | 29 | - | - | 24 | 29 | 32 | - | - | - | - | 386 |
| 1990–1991 | 37 | 37 | 30 | - | - | 33 | 28 | 29 | 28 | - | 36 | 35 | 24 | - | - | 31 | 30 | 29 | - | - | - | - | 407 |
| 1991–1992 | 31 | 35 | 27 | - | - | 37 | 37 | 30 | - | - | 33 | 27 | 25 | 28 | - | 36 | 36 | 22 | - | - | - | - | 404 |
| 1992–1993 | 36 | 34 | 28 | - | - | 31 | 36 | 27 | - | - | 39 | 37 | 31 | - | - | 34 | 27 | 27 | 26 | - | - | - | 413 |
| 1993–1994 | 30 | 28 | 24 | 19 | - | 36 | 35 | 28 | - | - | 32 | 36 | 24 | - | - | 39 | 35 | 31 | - | - | - | - | 397 |
| 1994–1995 | 30 | 28 | 25 | 29 | - | 31 | 29 | 23 | 21 | - | 36 | 35 | 30 | - | - | 32 | 36 | 23 | - | - | - | - | 408 |
| 1995–1996 | 31 | 26 | 25 | 25 | - | 31 | 27 | 26 | 30 | - | 31 | 29 | 24 | 22 | - | 35 | 34 | 23 | - | - | - | - | 419 |
| Year | 9. | | | | | 10. | | | | | 11. | | | | | 12. | | | | | 13. | | |
| Year | A | B | C | D | E | A | B | C | D | E | A | B | C | D | E | A | B | C | D | E | A | E | |
| 1996–1997 | 30 | 32 | 31 | 28 | - | 31 | 28 | 25 | 25 | - | 29 | 27 | 31 | 30 | - | 31 | 29 | 25 | 22 | - | - | - | 454 |
| 1997–1998 | 33 | 34 | 30 | 33 | - | 30 | 32 | 32 | 28 | - | 31 | 28 | 27 | 26 | - | 31 | 27 | 30 | 26 | - | - | - | 478 |
| 1998–1999 | 33 | 33 | 30 | 29 | - | 36 | 34 | 30 | 33 | - | 29 | 32 | 29 | 28 | - | 31 | 26 | 25 | 24 | - | - | - | 482 |
| 1999–2000 | 29 | 29 | 35 | 28 | - | 32 | 33 | 31 | 30 | - | 38 | 32 | 35 | 30 | - | 27 | 32 | 30 | 28 | - | - | - | 499 |
| 2000–2001 (Note: Beginning in the 2000/01 school year the E class, and from the following year the A class, was designated as the Arany János Program for Talented Youth.) | 32 | 28 | 32 | 30 | 23 | 29 | 29 | 35 | 28 | - | 34 | 35 | 33 | 28 | - | 34 | 33 | 35 | 30 | - | - | - | 528 |
| 2001–2002 | 25 | 30 | 35 | 35 | - | 31 | 28 | 33 | 30 | 22 | 27 | 32 | 36 | 28 | - | 34 | 33 | 33 | 28 | - | - | - | 520 |
| 2002–2003 | 26 | 31 | 31 | 33 | - | 25 | 31 | 35 | 35 | - | 31 | 29 | 33 | 28 | 22 | 28 | 31 | 36 | 28 | - | - | - | 513 |
| 2003–2004 | 31 | 35 | 34 | 34 | - | 25 | 30 | 31 | 33 | - | 25 | 33 | 35 | 34 | - | 31 | 29 | 34 | 26 | 22 | - | - | 522 |
| 2004–2005 | 29 | 33 | 30 | 31 | - | 30 | 35 | 35 | 34 | - | 24 | 29 | 32 | 35 | - | 24 | 33 | 30 | 34 | - | - | 22 | 520 |
| 2005–2006 | ? | ? | ? | ? | - | ? | ? | ? | ? | - | ? | ? | ? | ? | - | ? | ? | ? | ? | - | ? | - | ? |
| 2006–2007 | ? | 34 | 32 | ? | - | ? | ? | ? | ? | - | ? | ? | ? | ? | - | ? | ? | ? | ? | - | ? | - | ? |
| 2007–2008 | 29 | 30 | 32 | 30 | - | 33 | 35 | 32 | 35 | - | 25 | 31 | 31 | 29 | - | 27 | 34 | 28 | 29 | - | 29 | - | 519 |
| 2008–2009 | 25 | 35 | 31 | 38 | - | 26 | 31 | 30 | 29 | - | 31 | 36 | 30 | 35 | - | 24 | 31 | 31 | 29 | - | 25 | - | 517 |

== Picture gallery ==
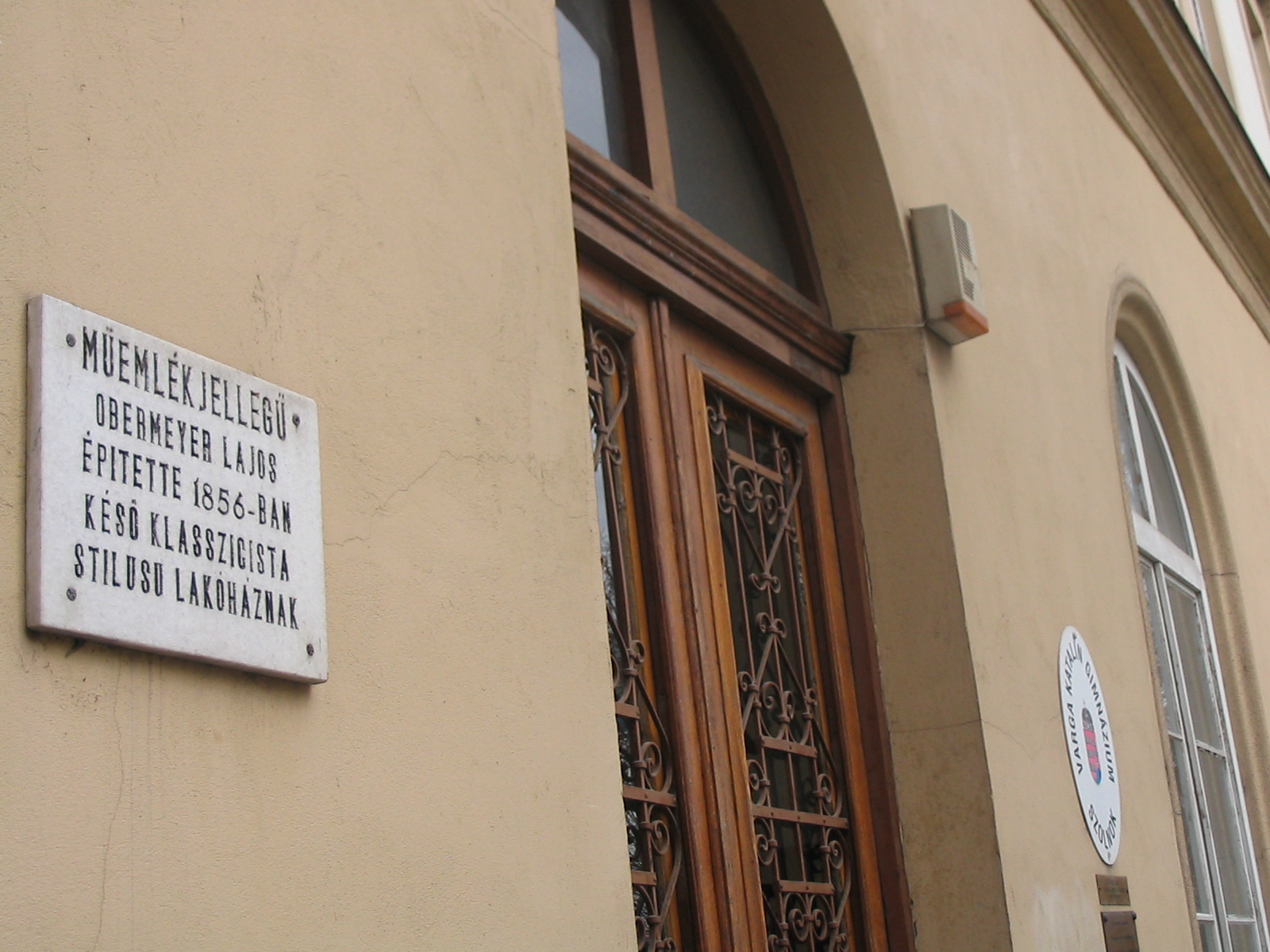
Front entrance and memorial plaque

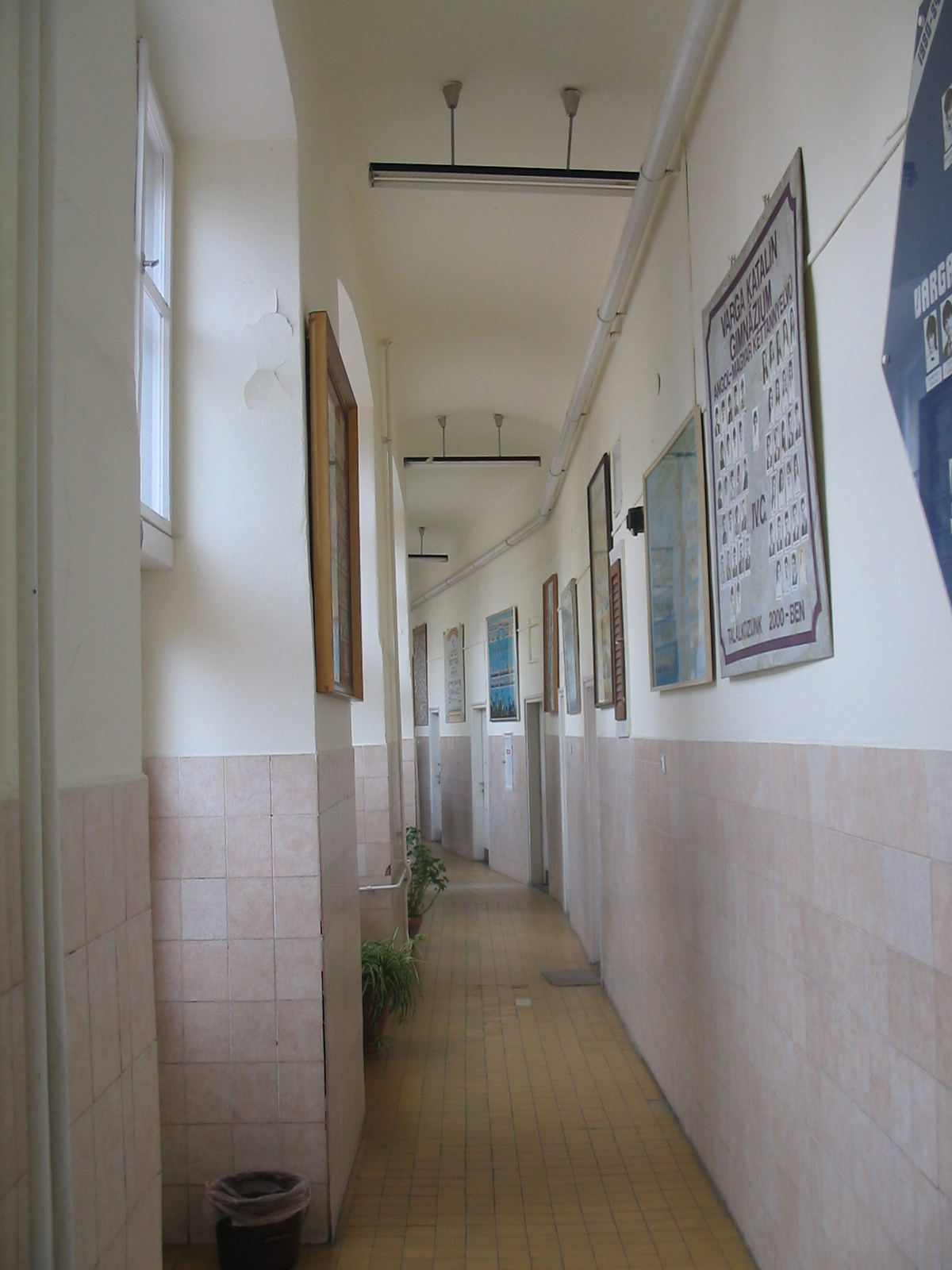
Downstairs hallway in the old wing

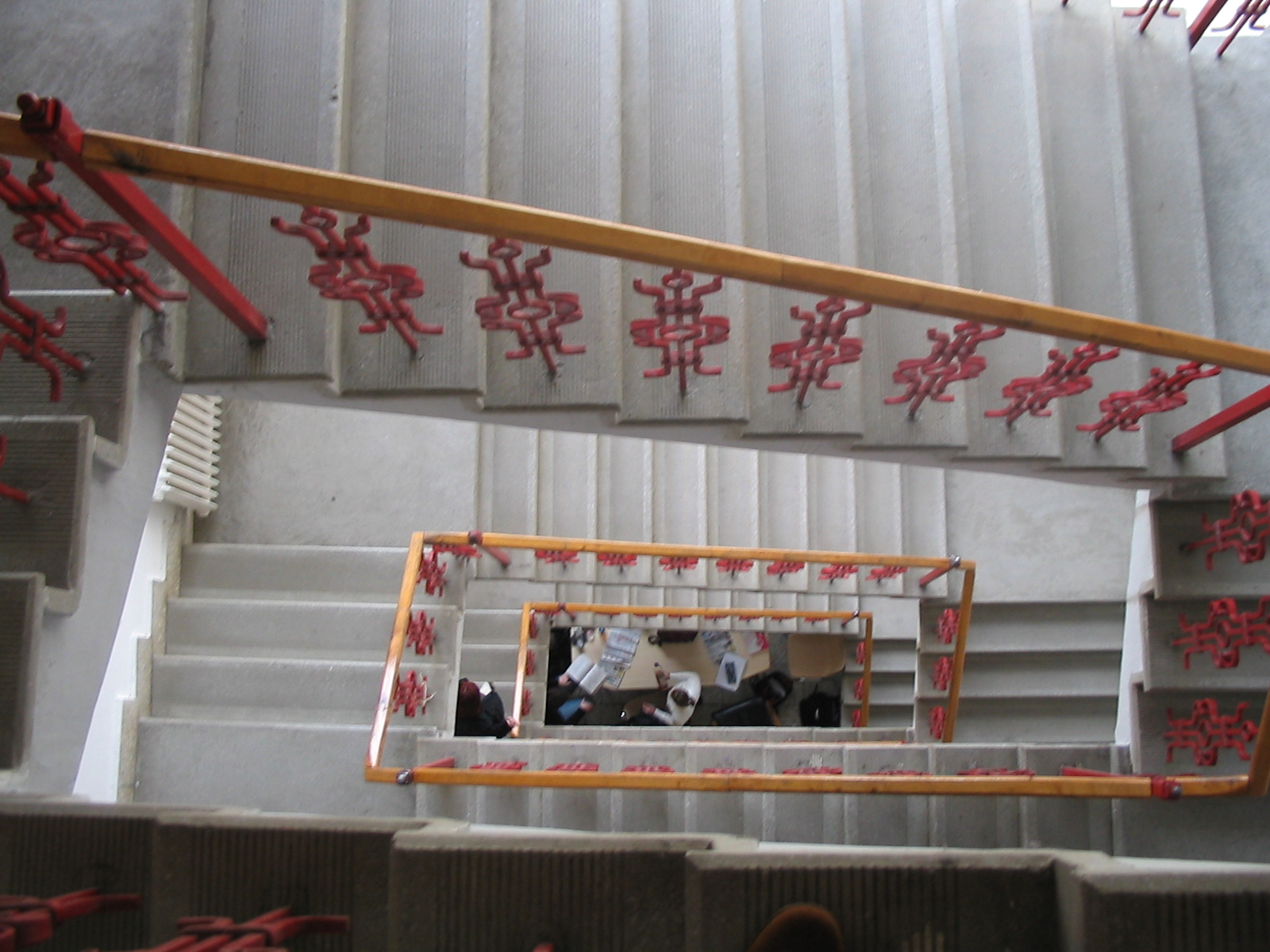
Stairwell of the new wing

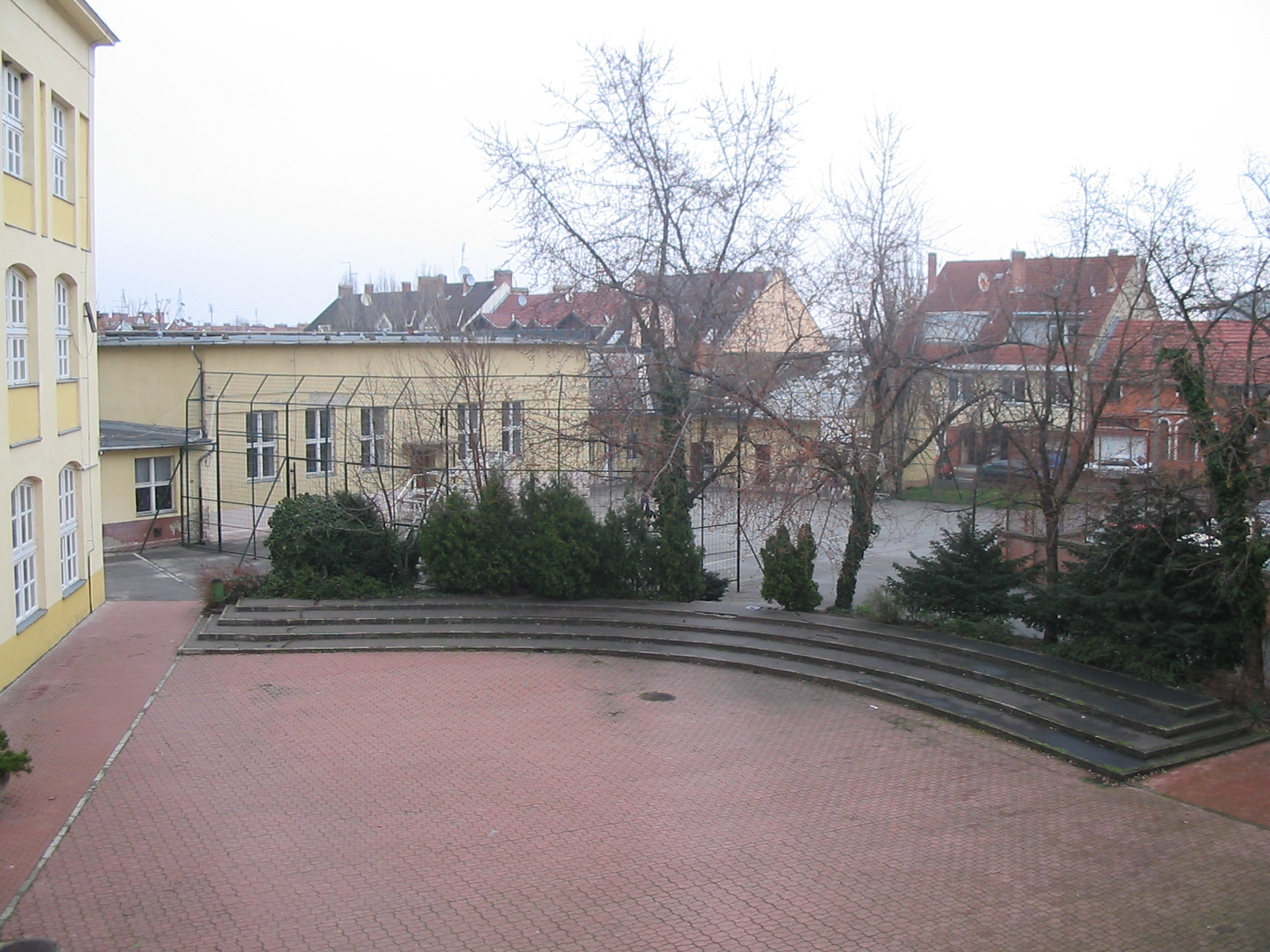
School courtyard

== Sources ==
Sources are in Hungarian, unless otherwise noted.
