= Mihály Rácz Rajna =

Hungarian stage actor (born 1934)

Mihály Rácz Rajna (born 15 January 1934) is a Hungarian stage actor.

Rajna finished at the Actors Academy in 1955. He was interned for two years following the 1956 Revolution for his anti-communist activities.

== Career ==
Rajna began his acting career in Debrecen. From 1970 to 1978 at the Deryne Theatre, in 1978 at the Szolnok Szigliget Theatre, from 1980 in the Peoples Theatre.

Rajna lived in Sydney, Australia until 1992, when he returned to Budapest.

== Acting roles ==
- Emberfi in Adáshiba by Szakonyi K.
- Tyihon in Vihar by Aleksandr Ostrovsky
- Pjotr in A sötétség hatalma by Leo Tolstoy
- Szépírástanár in A tavasz ébredése by Frank Wedekind
