= Katalin Varga =

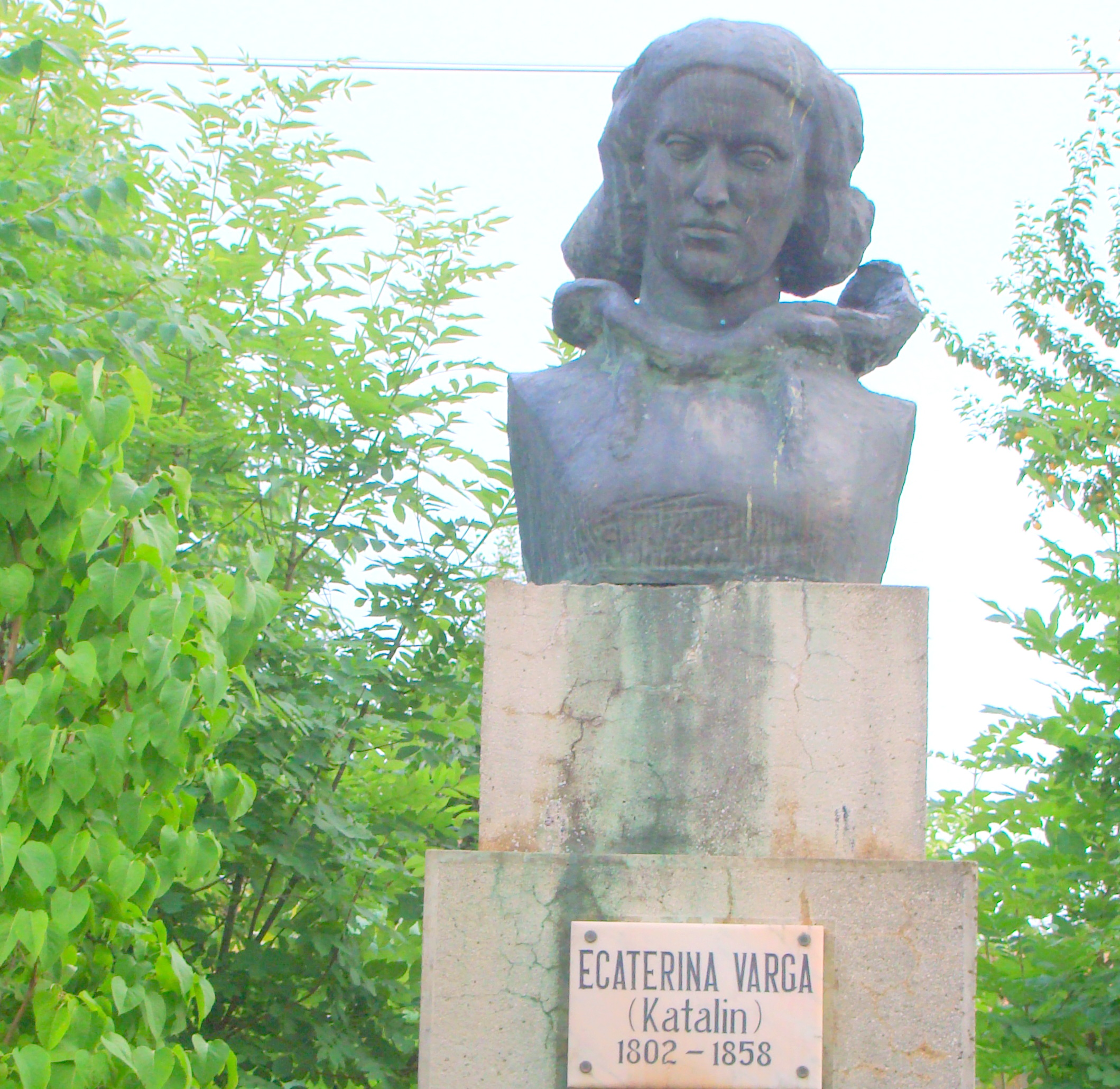
- Born: 22 August 1802; Hălmeag, Transylvania, Habsburg monarchy
- Died: c. 1858 (aged 55–56)
- Other names: Ecaterina Varga
- Spouse: György Kelemen (divorced)

Katalin Varga (Hungarian: Varga Katalin [ˈvɒrɡɒ ˈkɒtɒlin]; Romanian: Ecaterina Varga; 22 August 1802 – c. 1858) was the leader of the Transylvanian Miners' Movement in the 1840s.

== Life ==
=== Family and early life ===
Katalin Varga was born on 22 August 1802 in Hălmeag, Habsburg monarchy (present-day, Romania) into an impoverished Hungarian noble family. Her father János Varga and her mother Katalin Rosondai were minor landowners, and they worked their land themselves. The only reference to their state of nobility can be found in one petition dating from 1846. From the age of 10, Katalin Varga was raised by her aunt, along with her younger sister Ilonka and her brother. Other than her native language, Hungarian, she also spoke Romanian and German. Confessionwise, she was a Lutheran. At the age of 20, she married György Kelemen, a wealthy wheeler, whose two children she raised. She also joined him in his business, hemp trading. In the early days, the business made profit; but later they gave credit to customers who did not pay it back. In the meantime, Varga and Kelemen divorced, and he died shortly after.

=== Ropemaker's case ===
A certain rope-maker of Brassó (today Braşov, Romania) owed her the sum of 631 forints. Varga brought a suit against him to Brassó's borough council, which yielded no results, so she traveled to Vienna to ask for help at the royal court there. On 1 August 1839, the Royal Chancery declared that they could not reach a decision, and sent the case back to Brassó. Here the case lingered without resolution, so in April 1840 she returned to Vienna, where the court demanded that the Brassó borough council settle the matter. Again and again no resolution could be reached, and finally the case was dismissed and sent to archive by the district judge. Varga put her property losses behind her and attempted to start her life anew. In 1840, during the course of her travels to and from Vienna, she had met with mineworkers from the villages of Abrudfalva, Bucsony, and Abrudkerpenyes. These villages were part of the Zalatna Treasury Estate (Hung: zalatnai kincstári uradalom); at the time they were involved in a dispute with their landlord involving his unwillingness to pay them their part of the gold mines' income. The inhabitants of the three villages entrusted Varga with their case, and from this moment their interests became her own.

=== Three villages' case ===
After Varga moved to Bucium, she prepared a petition which she herself signed and brought to Vienna. It outlined the complaints of the three villages: harassment by the officers; an increase in forced labor; and a general breaking of the villagers' privileges. In January 1841 the petition came before the ruler; in 1842 the comitatus did send a fact-finding commission, but regarding a separate matter: the illegal use of the forest by the villagers. The representative, Deputy-Lieutenant Menyhért Fosztó, ruled against the villagers. In his report, he concluded that "the reason for the villagers' restlessness [was that they were being] incited by certain well-paid writers and officials, who profit from this trouble-making." In response to this, Varga advised the villagers to continue using as much wood as they wanted for their homes and furnaces, and to chase away the forest rangers. Presumably they did, and predictably in March 1843 the Royal Chancery reopened the case.

While the case was continuing, on 6 May 1843 a group of villagers of Detunáta, led by Varga, armed themselves with staffs and axes and marched against the government officials who had begun planting trees on the villagers' lands. In the end no one was harmed, but the villagers destroyed the saplings. This time around Deputy-Lieutenant Fosztó decided in favor of both the 1841 petition and on the side of the Detunáta villagers. The Treasury however was discontented with this, and labeled Varga a "dangerous rebel" and a "deceiver". This marks the beginning of several unsuccessful attempts on the part of the comitatus to capture Varga.

=== Active resistance ===
Beginning with the 18th century, there had been an ongoing effort to convert the local Romanian populace from Orthodox to Greek Catholic. Under the guise of this effort, Vienna tried to pacify the peasants by giving 1000 forints for the construction of a new Greek Catholic parish in Bucsony. On 25 April 1845, when work should have already begun, the locals rose up against it in the belief that the building was a government office. Dumitru Nicoară and others tried to prevent with pitchforks the construction, claiming that the land belonged to the peasants. Vienna assumed that the instigator of the problems was Varga. She was no longer allowed to travel to Vienna and many of her newer petitions were rejected outright.

On 9 March 1845, Varga gave a speech in front of the Abrudfalva church in which she spoke out against the government officials who continued cutting wood from the villages' forests. She also enlisted the help of local lawyer Sámuel Szakács Mikes to deal with new government restrictions on alcoholic drinks. Because of her rapidly growing influence, pressure was put on Deputy-Lieutenant Fosztó, who began speaking with and trying to advise the villagers personally, with only minor successes. In Bucsony, Katalin Varga and 50 followers armed with staffs went to the courtyard of judge Ion Pleşa Danciu; their demands of an explanation about their tax moneys resulted in a minor scuffle. Reports about these events named Varga guilty of inciting them all, and the Treasury continued to press for her capture.

On 10 August 1846, at the news of a peasant uprising in Galicia, Chancellor Baron Sámuel Jósika and Governor-general Count József Teleky requested military aid from General Anton Freiherr von Puchner. In light to this situation, Varga personally took a petition to Vienna in which she admitted to the faults in some of her and the villages' actions, asked pardon for their mistakes, and thanked the court for their continued patience in the matter, but also restated the problems of the villages, which had still not been solved. The petition also contained a separate letter from the three villages, in which they took on responsibility for Varga's actions and thereby legitimized her safe-passage to Vienna. They further requested an independent examination of the issues at the expense of the villages, and that all military intervention should cease until after the examination had concluded. Chancellor Jósika, who feared outright rebellion in the country, suspended military actions and asked for the assistance of Andrei Şaguna, who had been named vicar on 27 June 1846.

=== Imprisonment and subsequent years ===
The authorities were not pleased with these claims, and took action to imprison Varga as the instigator. With the assistance of resident bishop Şaguna, she was arrested on trumped-up charges in January 1847. First she was held in the prison at Nagyenyed, and then at Gyulafehérvár, where she was held for nearly four years without judgment.

The trial finally took place in 1851, with a sentence of three months given. After serving her time, Varga was exiled to the village of her birth, Halmágy. It is assumed that she lived out the remainder of her life there, and died sometime after 1852.

== Posthumous recognitions ==
In 1977, the villagers in Hălmeag erected a monument to Varga in the courtyard of the local church. During the communist era, the Hălmeag collective farm was named after her. In 1951, the Secondary School for Girls in Szolnok, Hungary, adopted the name "Varga Katalin Secondary School", which it retains to this day. Also, in Romania, several streets are named Ecaterina Varga, the Romanian form of her name.

== Sources ==
- I. Tóth Zoltán (1951). Varga Katalin (in Hungarian). Budapest: Művelt Nép Könyvkiadó. 943. T80.
- Kiss András, ed. (1980) [1979]. Varga Katalin pere (in Hungarian). Bucharest: Kriterion Könyvkiadó. ISBN 963-07-2076-0.
- Kenyeres Ágnes (ed.). "Varga Katalin". Magyar Életrajzi Lexikon (in Hungarian).
- Cseh Andrásné, ed. (1959). "Varga Katalin". A szolnoki Varga Katalin Általános Leánygimnázium évkönyve az 1958/59. tanévről (in Hungarian). Szolnok: Headmaster of the school. pp. 3–4.
