= Verseghy Ferenc Gymnasium =

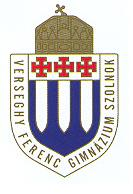
- Coat of arms of the school

Location
- Szolnok; Hungary; 47.1720°N 20.1955°E

Information
- Established: 1831; 195 years ago
- Faculty: 46
- Enrollment: 552

Verseghy Ferenc Gymnasium (Hungarian: Verseghy Ferenc Gimnázium) is a gymnasium, a co-educational secondary state school, located in Szolnok, Northern Great Plain, Hungary. It is one of the oldest Gymnasiums in the region and is rich in traditions. The school was founded in 1831 and was named after the famous native of Szolnok, Ferenc Verseghy in 1922. At present (2011) 552 pupils attending 17 classes are taught by 46 teachers.

== History ==
Upon the request of the citizens of Szolnok, Francis I, King of Hungary endorsed the establishment of a Gymnasium in 1831.

It was provisionally run on the premises of a Franciscan monastery until 1835, when it was given its own building. Despite its promising development, the school was forced to close down for financial reasons between 1852 and 1862.

When it was nationalised in 1887, the construction of a new building was also seen to, which was eventually finished in 1892. The Eclectic edifice was erected at the most beautiful place in town, where the house of birth of Verseghy Ferenc, the renowned linguist and poet once stood. Instruction began in the new, but only partially finished building in September 1888.

The Gymnasium was named after Verseghy Ferenc at the centenary of his death, 1922. It continued to develop in the 1930s, playing an important role in the cultural life of the town. It was then that its students first started achieving outstanding results at national academic competitions. However, instruction had to be suspended due to the Second World War as the building was put into the service of the Germans, and later the Red Army.

The school assumed the name of Nikos Beloyannis in 1952, but the politically motivated name change was short-lived, and the school regained its former name in 1955. The most populous year in the school’s history was 1970, with 700 pupils attending the classes of 36 teachers. By then, excellent results of Verseghy students at national competitions were fairly customary.

In 1981, the building underwent a comprehensive reconstruction, the works being finished off by the building of a modern, well-equipped gymnasium in 1986. The school building was further expanded in 1995, providing the canteen and computer rooms with suitable housing.

=== Coat of arms ===
The current coat of arms was designed in 1932 and was in use between 1932 and 1945. Political changes necessitated a change in the design, but in 1990 the former coat of arms was reinstated and has been in use since.

The coat of arms is made up of a dark blue shield with three broadswords in the middle to symbolise the three main objectives of education, namely science, arts and moral. Above the shield the Hungarian Holy Crown can be seen.

The inscription on the shield reads Verseghy Ferenc Gimnázium Szolnok.

== Campus ==
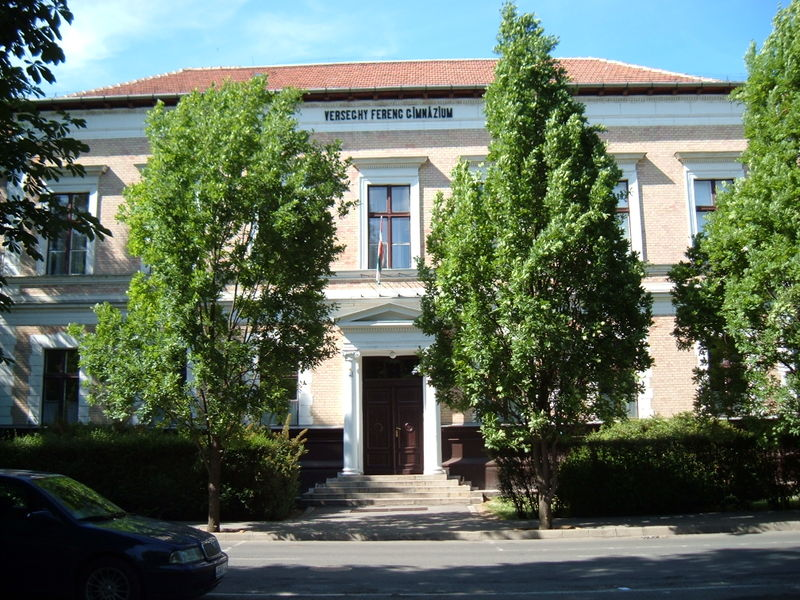
The school façade

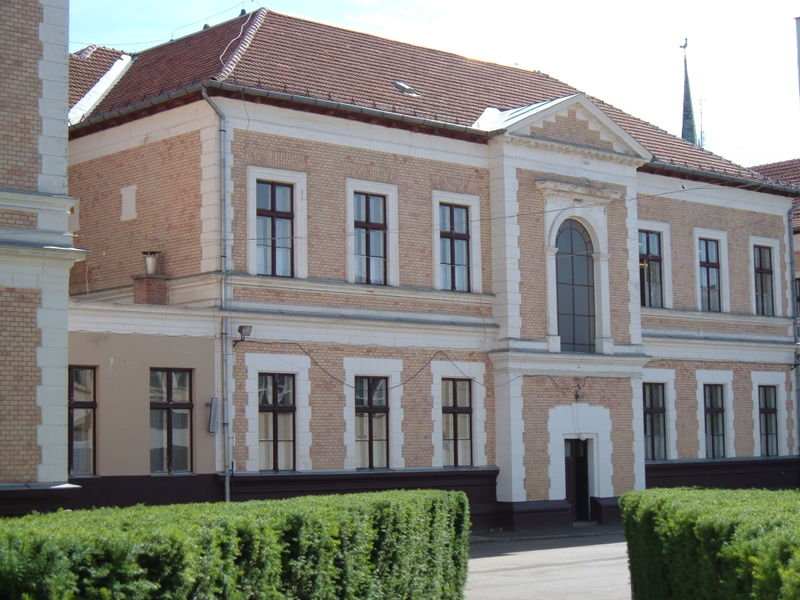
Backyard

== Curriculum ==
Verseghy Ferenc Gymnasium offers instruction in the last four years of secondary education, leading up to a General Certificate of Education or Matura, entitling its holders to admission to Hungary’s institutions of higher education. Students may choose to sit their school leaving examination either at advanced or ordinary level.

Each year, four classes with the following specialisations are started:

- Mathematics (since the 1960s)
- English (since 1980) and German (since 1998)
- Natural sciences (since 1991)
- Humanities

== See also ==
- Szolnok
- Education in Hungary
