= Országos Középiskolai Tanulmányi Verseny =

Hungarian national olympiad

The Országos Középiskolai Tanulmányi Verseny (OKTV; lit. 'National Secondary School Academic Competition') is a Hungarian academic competition for secondary school–students in Hungary. Those students that have reached the finals are exempt from completing the matura in that subject. Students in their last two years of secondary school compete in various subjects, such as foreign languages, biology, IT, philosophy, physics, geography, chemistry, literature, mathematics, and history.
