= Adáshiba =

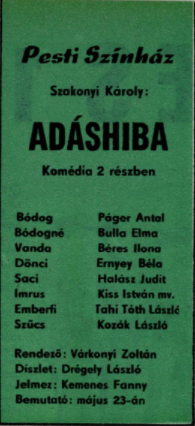
Advertising of the premiere

Adáshiba is a Hungarian play, written by Károly Szakonyi. It was first produced in 1970.
